= Incertae sedis (Lithosiini) =

Scientific classification
- Kingdom: Animalia
- Phylum: Arthropoda
- Clade: Pancrustacea
- Class: Insecta
- Order: Lepidoptera
- Superfamily: Noctuoidea
- Family: Erebidae
- Subfamily: Arctiinae
- Tribe: Lithosiini
- Subtribe: Incertae sedis

List of moth genera

Several genera of the Lithosiini tribe of lichen moths are placed as incertae sedis due to the uncertainty of their phylogenetic relationships within the tribe.

== Genera ==
The following genera are not classified in a subtribe.

- Abrochocis
- Acanthofrontia
- Achroosia
- Adoxosia
- Adrepsa
- Aeolosia
- Aethosia
- Agkonia
- Aglossosia
- Aglossosia
- Agrisius
- Agylloides
- Alepista
- Amalodeta
- Ameleta
- Amplicincia
- Anaemosia
- Anaene
- Anaphleps
- Anaphosia
- Anaulosia
- Anestia
- Antona
- Apogurea
- Apothosia
- Aptilosia
- Archilema
- Archithosia
- Ardonea
- Ardonissa
- Areva
- Arhabdosia
- Arrhythmica
- Ascaptesyle
- Astacosia
- Asurgylla
- Asuridoides
- Asythosia
- Atelophleps
- Ateucheta
- Avela
- Balbura
- Barsinella
- Barsipennis
- Birgorima
- Bitecta
- Blabioides
- Blavia
- Boenasa
- Brachiosia
- Bryantia
- Brycea
- Callisthenia
- Carcinopodia
- Carilephia
- Castronia
- Castulo
- Chionosia
- Chlorogenia
- Chrysaeglia
- Chrysaegliodes
- Chrysochlorosia
- Chrysozana
- Cincia
- Clemendana
- Cloesia
- Comachara
- Conilepia
- Costarcha
- Cragia
- Cristulosia
- Ctenosia
- Cybosia
- Cyclosticta
- Darantasiella
- Deloplotela
- Deua
- Diadesmola
- Diarhabdosia
- Didymonyx
- Dipaenae
- Disaulota
- Disoidemata
- Dixanaene
- Dohertya
- Dolichesia
- Dotha
- Epeiromulona
- Epitalara
- Euclemensoides
- Eudoliche
- Eugonosia
- Eugraphosia
- Euproctosia
- Eurozonosia
- Eurylomia
- Eurynora
- Eutelesia
- Euthyone
- Euzeugapteryx
- Exilisia
- Fabresema
- Gaudeator
- Geridixis
- Geriojennsa
- Glaucosia
- Goniosema
- Grucia
- Gylla
- Halone
- Halurgia
- Hanoisiella
- Hassleria
- Hectobrocha
- Heliorabdia
- Hemipsilia
- Hestiarcha
- Hesychopa
- Heterotropa
- Hobapromea
- Holochrea
- Hypagoptera
- Hypareva
- Hypasura
- Hypermaepha
- Hyperthagylla
- Hypeugoa
- Idopterum
- Ionthas
- Isorropus
- Lacydoides
- Lamprosiella
- Lamprostola
- Lepidilema
- Lepista
- Lepista
- Leptopepla
- Leucorhodia
- Lithoprocris
- Lobilema
- Lomuna
- Lymantriopsis
- Lysceia
- Machairophora
- Macroptila
- Macrosia
- Mahensia
- Marsypophora
- Megalobosia
- Melastrota
- Meneclia
- Metagylla
- Metallosia
- Metalobosia
- Metareva
- Meterythrosia
- Meteura
- Metexilisia
- Micrilema
- Microhyle
- Micrommia
- Microstola
- Miltasura
- Mintopola
- Mulona
- Muxta
- Nanna
- Neagylla
- Neardonaea
- Neasuroides
- Nelo
- Neoduma
- Neomulona
- Neoplynes
- Neosiccia
- Neotalara
- Neothyone
- Neozana
- Nephelosia
- Nesiotica
- Nilgiricola
- Nipponasura
- Nodozana
- Nolinophanes
- Novosia
- Nudina
- Nudosia
- Nudur
- Nyctochroa
- Nyctosia
- Ochrota
- Odozana
- Oedaleosia
- Onychipodia
- Onymapata
- Oreopola
- Ovenna
- Ovipennis
- Pachasura
- Pachycerosia
- Pagara
- Palaeosiccia
- Palaeozana
- Parabitecta
- Paracincia
- Paradoxosia
- Paragylla
- Paramulona
- Paraonagylla
- Parapalosia
- Parascolia
- Parashada
- Parasiccia
- Paratalara
- Paratype
- Parelictis
- Paremonia
- Pareugoa
- Parexilisia
- Parvicincia
- Parvicincia
- Pasteosia
- Paulianosia
- Phaeophlebosia
- Phaeosia
- Phaulosia
- Phenacomorpha
- Philenora
- Phryganopsis
- Physetocneme
- Pliniola
- Plumareola
- Poliodule
- Prepiella
- Procridia
- Procrimima
- Progona
- Prolobosia
- Pronola
- Proxhyle
- Pseudlepista
- Pseudomacroptila
- Pseudophanes
- Pusiola
- Ranghana
- Rhagophanes
- Rhodographa
- Saozana
- Scaphidriotis
- Serincia
- Seripha
- Sicciaemorpha
- Siculifer
- Sidyma
- Siopastea
- Snellenopsis
- Snellenopsis
- Spatulosia
- Spatulosia
- Stenarcha
- Stenaulis
- Stenaulis
- Stenilema
- Stenopterosia
- Stenosia
- Sterrhosia
- Sylescaptia
- Symmetrodes
- Syntomimorpha
- Talara
- Tampea
- Termessa
- Tesma
- Thallarcha
- Thermeola
- Threnosia
- Tineopsis
- Tmetoptera
- Tospitis
- Trichareva
- Trissobrocha
- Tropacme
- Tuina
- Turlinia
- Urozana
- Vianania
- Viettesia
- Vulmara
- Xantholopha
- Yelva
- Zadadrina
