= List of arctiine genera: A–M =

The large moth subfamily Arctiinae contains the following genera with names beginning from A to M:

(For names beginning from N to Z, see List of arctiine genera: N–Z.)

Contents:	A B C D E F G H I J K L M — References

== A ==
- Abnormipterus
- Abrochocis
- Acantharctia
- Acanthofrontia
- Acco
- Achroosia
- Aclytia
- Acsala
- Adoxosia
- Aedoea
- Aemilia
- Aeolosia
- Aethalida
- Aethosia
- Aethria
- Afroarctia
- Agaltara
- Agaraea
- Agkonia
- Aglaomorpha
- Aglossosia
- Agrisius
- Agunaix
- Agylla
- Agylloides
- Agyrta
- Agyrtidia
- Agyrtiola
- Alandria
- Alepista
- Alexicles
- Allanwatsonia
- Aloa
- Alpenus
- Alphaea
- Amalodeta
- Amastus
- Amata
- Amatula
- Amaxia
- Amerila
- Ammalo
- Amphelarctia
- Amphicallia
- Amplicincia
- Amsacta
- Amsactarctia
- Amsactoides
- Amurrhyparia
- Anaemosia
- Anaene
- Anaphe
- Anaphlebia
- Anaphleps
- Anaphosia
- Anapisa
- Anaulosia
- Anaxita
- Andala
- Antichloris
- Antiotricha
- Antona
- Anycles
- Apaidia
- Apantesis
- Apeplopoda
- Aphra
- Aphyarctia
- Aphyle
- Apiconoma
- Apisa
- Apistosia
- Apocerea
- Apocrisias
- Apogurea
- Apothosia
- Aptilosia
- Apyre
- Arachnis
- Araeomolis
- Archilema
- Archithosia
- Arctagyrta
- Arctia
- Arctiarpia
- Arctiites
- Ardices
- Ardonea
- Ardonissa
- Are
- Areas
- Areva
- Argina
- Argyarctia
- Argyroeides
- Arhabdosia
- Arrhythmica
- Ascaptesyle
- Asparus
- Astacosia
- Astralarctia
- Asura
- Asurgylla
- Asuridia
- Asuridoides
- Asythosia
- Atelophleps
- Ateucheta
- Atolmis
- Atyphopsis
- Auriculoceryx
- Autochloris
- Automolis
- Avela
- Axiopoena
- Axiopoeniella
- Azatrephes

== B ==
- Balaca
- Balacra
- Balbura
- Baritius
- Baroa
- Barsinella
- Belemnia
- Belemniastis
- Bergeria
- Bernathonomus
- Bertholdia
- Binna
- Birgorima
- Bitecta
- Biturix
- Blabioides
- Blavia
- Boadicea
- Boenasa
- Brachiosia
- Bruceia
- Brunia
- Bryantia
- Brycea
- Bucaea
- Burtia
- Byrsia

== C ==
- Cacostatia
- Caeneressa
- Calamidia
- Calidota
- Callimorpha
- Callindra
- Callisthenia
- Callopepla
- Calodesma
- Calonotos
- Calpenia
- Camptoloma
- Canararctia
- Caprimimodes
- Carales
- Carathis
- Carcinarctia
- Carcinopodia
- Carcinopyga
- Caribarctia
- Carilephia
- Carpostalagma
- Castrica
- Castronia
- Castulo
- Catalana
- Caulocera
- Celamodes
- Ceramidia
- Ceramidiodes
- Cercocladia
- Cercopimorpha
- Ceryx
- Chamaita
- Cheliosea
- Chelis
- Chetone
- Chionarctia
- Chionosia
- Chiretolpis
- Chlorhoda
- Chlorocrisia
- Chlorogenia
- Chrostosoma
- Chrysaeglia
- Chrysaegliodes
- Chrysallactis
- Chrysasura
- Chrysocale
- Chrysochlorosia
- Chrysomesia
- Chrysorabdia
- Chrysoscota
- Chrysozana
- Cincia
- Cisseps
- Cissura
- Cisthene
- Cladarctia
- Clemendana
- Clemensia
- Cloesia
- Clystea
- Coiffaitarctia
- Comachara
- Composia
- Conilepia
- Corematura
- Coreura
- Correbia
- Correbidia
- Coscinia
- Cosmosoma
- Costarcha
- Cragia
- Crambidia
- Cratoplastis
- Creatonotos
- Cresera
- Cristulosia
- Crocodeta
- Crocomela
- Ctenosia
- Ctenucha
- Ctenuchidia
- Curoba
- Cyana
- Cyanarctia
- Cyanopepla
- Cybosia
- Cyclomilta
- Cyclosiella
- Cyclosodes
- Cyclosticta
- Cycnia
- Cymaroa
- Cymbalophora
- Cyme

== D ==
- Dahana
- Damias
- Darantasia
- Darantasiella
- Darantoides
- Dasyarctia
- Dasysphinx
- Deloplotela
- Delphyre
- Demolis
- Deua
- Diaconisia
- Diacrisia
- Diadesmola
- Dialeucias
- Diaphora
- Diarhabdosia
- Diaxanthia
- Dichrostoptera
- Didaphne
- Didasys
- Diduga
- Didymonyx
- Digama
- Dinia
- Dionychoscelis
- Diospage
- Dipaenae
- Diptilon
- Disasuridia
- Disaulota
- Disconeura
- Disoidemata
- Disparctia
- Divarctia
- Dixanaene
- Dixophlebia
- Dodia
- Dohertya
- Dolgoma
- Dolichesia
- Dotha
- Dubianaclia
- Dycladia
- Dysauxes
- Dysschema

== E ==
- Ecdemus
- Echeta
- Ectypia
- Eilema
- Elysius
- Empyreuma
- Emurena
- Enope
- Eospilarctia
- Epanycles
- Epatolmis
- Epectaptera
- Epeiromulona
- Ephestris
- Epicrisias
- Epidesma
- Epilacydes
- Epimolis
- Epimydia
- Episcea
- Episcepsis
- Epitalara
- Epitoxis
- Eressa
- Eriomastyx
- Eriostepta
- Eriphioides
- Ernassa
- Estigmene
- Euagra
- Eucereon
- Euceriodes
- Euchaetes
- Euchlaenidia
- Euchlorostola
- Euchromia
- Euclemensoides
- Euclera
- Euconosia
- Eucyanoides
- Eucyclopera
- Eucyrta
- Eudesmia
- Eudiaphora
- Eudoliche
- Euerythra
- Eugoa
- Eugonosia
- Eugraphosia
- Euleechia
- Eumenogaster
- Eunomia
- Euplagia
- Euproctosia
- Eupseudosoma
- Eupyra
- Eurata
- Eurosia
- Eurozonosia
- Eurylomia
- Eurynora
- Eutane
- Eutelesia
- Euthyone
- Eutomis
- Euzeugapteryx
- Evius
- Exilisia
- Eyralpenus

== F ==
- Fabresema
- Fasslia
- Fletcherinia
- Fodinoidea

== G ==
- Galtara
- Galtarodes
- Gampola
- Gandhara
- Gangamela
- Gardinia
- Garudinia
- Garudinistis
- Garudinodes
- Gaudeator
- Geridixis
- Geriojennsa
- Ghoria
- Glaucosia
- Glaucostola
- Gnamptonychia
- Gnophaela
- Gonotrephes
- Gorgonidia
- Grammarctia
- Graphea
- Graphosia
- Graptasura
- Grucia
- Gylla
- Gymnasura
- Gymnelia

== H ==
- Haemanota
- Haemaphlebiella
- Haematomis
- Halone
- Halurgia
- Halysidota
- Hanoisiella
- Haploa
- Haplonerita
- Hassleria
- Hectobrocha
- Heliactinidia
- Heliorabdia
- Heliosia
- Heliozona
- Heliura
- Hemihyalea
- Hemipsilia
- Hemonia
- Herea
- Hestiarcha
- Hesudra
- Hesychopa
- Heterallactis
- Heterotropa
- Hiera
- Himerarctia
- Hippurarctia
- Histioea
- Hobapromea
- Holocraspedon
- Holophaea
- Homoeocera
- Homoneuronia
- Hoppiana
- Horama
- Horamella
- Hyalaethea
- Hyalarctia
- Hyaleucerea
- Hyalomis
- Hyalurga
- Hyarias
- Hyda
- Hypagoptera
- Hypareva
- Hypasura
- Hypatia
- Hyperandra
- Hypercompe
- Hypermaepha
- Hyperphara
- Hyperthaema
- Hyperthagylla
- Hypeugoa
- Hyphantria
- Hypidalia
- Hypidota
- Hypocharis
- Hypocladia
- Hypocrisias
- Hypocrita
- Hypomolis
- Hyponerita
- Hypoprepia
- Hyposhada

== I ==
- Ichoria
- Idalus
- Idopterum
- Ilemodes
- Inopsis
- Ionthas
- Isanthrene
- Ischnarctia
- Ischnocampa
- Ischnognatha
- Isia
- Isorropus
- Isostola
- Ixylasia

== J ==
- Josiomorpha
- Josiomorphoides

== K ==
- Karschiola
- Katha
- Katmeteugoa
- Kiriakoffalia
- Kodiosoma

== L ==
- Lacydes
- Lacydoides
- Laelapia
- Lafajana
- Laguerreia
- Lalanneia
- Lambula
- Lambulodes
- Lambulosia
- Lamprosiella
- Lamprostola
- Lampruna
- Lemyra
- Lepidilema
- Lepidojulia
- Lepidokirbyia
- Lepidolutzia
- Lepidoneiva
- Lepidozikania
- Lepista
- Leptarctia
- Leptoceryx
- Leptopepla
- Lepypiranga
- Lerina
- Leucaloa
- Leucanopsis
- Leucopleura
- Leucorhodia
- Leucotmemis
- Licnoptera
- Lithoprocris
- Lithosarctia
- Lithosia
- Lobilema
- Lobobasis
- Lomuna
- Lophocampa
- Loxomima
- Loxophlebia
- Loxozona
- Lyclene
- Lycomorpha
- Lycomorphodes
- Lymantriopsis
- Lymire
- Lysceia

== M ==
- Macaduma
- Macadumosia
- Machadoia
- Machaeraptenus
- Machairophora
- Macotasa
- Macrobrochis
- Macrocneme
- Macroptila
- Macrosia
- Maculonaclia
- Magnoptera
- Mahensia
- Malesia
- Mallocephala
- Mallodeta
- Mannina
- Mantala
- Manulea
- Marecidia
- Marsypophora
- Maurica
- Mazaeras
- Megalobosia
- Meganaclia
- Melanaema
- Melanarctia
- Melanonaclia
- Melastrota
- Melese
- Melisa
- Melisoides
- Mellamastus
- Mellona
- Melora
- Meneclia
- Menegites
- Mesenochroa
- Mesocerea
- Mesothen
- Metacrias
- Metacrisia
- Metacrisiodes
- Metacrocea
- Metagylla
- Metallosia
- Metaloba
- Metalobosia
- Metamicroptera
- Metamya
- Metarctia
- Metareva
- Metastatia
- Metaxanthia
- Meterythrosia
- Meteugoa
- Meteura
- Metexilisia
- Methysia
- Mevania
- Micragrella
- Micragyrta
- Micralarctia
- Micrarctia
- Micrilema
- Microbergeria
- Microgiton
- Microhyle
- Micrommia
- Micronaclia
- Microstola
- Microtane
- Midara
- Migoplastis
- Miltasura
- Miltochrista
- Mimagyrta
- Mintopola
- Mithuna
- Monosyntaxis
- Mulona
- Munona
- Muxta
- Mydromera
- Myopsyche
- Myrmecopsis
- Myserla
- Mystrocneme
