= List of arctiine genera: N–Z =

The large moth subfamily Arctiinae contains the following genera with names beginning from N to Z:

(For names beginning from A to M, see List of arctiine genera: A–M.)

Contents:	N O P Q R S T U V W X Y Z – References

== N ==
- Nacliodes
- Nanna
- Nannoarctia
- Nannoceryx
- Nannodota
- Narosodes
- Neagylla
- Neardonaea
- Neasura
- Neasuroides
- Nebrarctia
- Neeressa
- Neidalia
- Nelphe
- Neoduma
- Neomulona
- Neonerita
- Neophemula
- Neoplynes
- Neoscaptia
- Neosiccia
- Neotalara
- Neothyone
- Neotrichura
- Neozana
- Neozatrephes
- Nephelomilta
- Nephelosia
- Nepita
- Neritonaclia
- Nesiotica
- Neuroxena
- Nezula
- Nikaea
- Nilgiricola
- Nipponasura
- Nishada
- Nodozana
- Nolinophanes
- Notophyson
- Novosia
- Nudaria
- Nudina
- Nudosia
- Nudur
- Nyctemera
- Nyctochroa
- Nyctosia
- Nyea
- Nyearctia
- Nyridela

== O ==
- Ochrodota
- Ochrota
- Ocnogyna
- Odozana
- Oedaleosia
- Oeonistis
- Oeonosia
- Olepa
- Oligamatites
- Omiosia
- Omochroa
- Onychipodia
- Onymapata
- Onythes
- Opharus
- Opsaroa
- Orcynia
- Ordishia
- Oreoceryx
- Oreopola
- Ormetica
- Orontobia
- Osmocneme
- Ovenna
- Ovipennis
- Owambarctia
- Oxacme

== P ==
- Pachasura
- Pachycerosia
- Pachyceryx
- Pachydota
- Padenia
- Padenodes
- Pagara
- Paidia
- Palaeomolis
- Palaeosia
- Palaeosiccia
- Palaeotype
- Palaeozana
- Panachranta
- Pangora
- Parabitecta
- Paraceryx
- Paracincia
- Paracles
- Paradinia
- Paradohertya
- Paradoxosia
- Paraethria
- Paragylla
- Paralacydes
- Paralaethia
- Paralithosia
- Paralpenus
- Paramaenas
- Paramelisa
- Paramevania
- Paramsacta
- Paramulona
- Paramyopsyche
- Paranerita
- Paraona
- Paraonagylla
- Parapalosia
- Paraplastis
- Paraplesis
- Parascaptia
- Parascepsis
- Parascolia
- Parashada
- Parasiccia
- Paraspilarctia
- Parastatia
- Paratalara
- Parathyris
- Paratype
- Parelictis
- Paremonia
- Pareuchaetes
- Pareugoa
- Parevia
- Parexilisia
- Parvicincia
- Pasteosia
- Patreliura
- Paulianosia
- Paurophleps
- Pelochyta
- Pelosia
- Pezaptera
- Phacusa
- Phacusosia
- Phaegoptera
- Phaenarete
- Phaeomolis
- Phaeophlebosia
- Phaeosia
- Phaeosphecia
- Phaio
- Phaloe
- Phaloesia
- Phaos
- Phaulosia
- Pheia
- Phenacomorpha
- Philenora
- Phlogomera
- Phlyctaenogastra
- Phoenicoprocta
- Phoeniostacta
- Phragmatobia
- Phryganopsis
- Phryganopteryx
- Physetocneme
- Pitane
- Pithea
- Pleurosoma
- Pliniola
- Plumareola
- Podomachla
- Poecilarctia
- Poecilosoma
- Poliodule
- Poliopastea
- Poliosia
- Pompiliodes
- Pompilopsis
- Popoudina
- Prabhasa
- Praemastus
- Premolis
- Prepiella
- Procalypta
- Procanthia
- Procridia
- Procrimima
- Proctocopis
- Progona
- Prolobosia
- Pronola
- Propyria
- Proschaliphora
- Prosiccia
- Prosopidia
- Protolithosia
- Protracta
- Proxhyle
- Prytania
- Pryteria
- Pseudaclytia
- Pseudaethria
- Pseudalus
- Pseudamastus
- Pseudapistosia
- Pseudarctia
- Pseudischnocampa
- Pseudlepista
- Pseudmelisa
- Pseudoblabes
- Pseudoceryx
- Pseudocharis
- Pseudodiptera
- Pseudoedaleosia
- Pseudogaltara
- Pseudohemihyalea
- Pseudohyaleucerea
- Pseudomacroptila
- Pseudonaclia
- Pseudophaio
- Pseudophaloe
- Pseudophanes
- Pseudopharus
- Pseudopompilia
- Pseudoradiarctia
- Pseudoscaptia
- Pseudosphecosoma
- Pseudosphenoptera
- Pseudosphex
- Pseudotessellarctia
- Pseudothyretes
- Psichotoe
- Psilopleura
- Psoloptera
- Psychophasma
- Pteroodes
- Ptychoglene
- Ptychotricos
- Purius
- Pusiola
- Pydnaodes
- Pygarctia
- Pygoctenucha
- Pyrrharctia

== Q ==
- Quadrasura

== R ==
- Radiarctia
- Rajendra
- Ranghana
- Regobarrosia
- Rhabdatomis
- Rhagophanes
- Rhipha
- Rhipidarctia
- Rhodogastria
- Rhodographa
- Rhynchopyga
- Robinsonia
- Romualdia
- Romualdisca

== S ==
- Saenura
- Sagaropsis
- Saozana
- Sarosa
- Satara
- Saurita
- Sauritinia
- Scaphidriotis
- Scaptesyle
- Scaptius
- Scearctia
- Scelilasia
- Scena
- Schalodeta
- Schalotomis
- Schistophleps
- Sciopsyche
- Scoliacma
- Scoliosia
- Sebastia
- Secusio
- Seileria
- Seirarctia
- Selenarctia
- Senecauxia
- Serincia
- Seripha
- Sesiura
- Setina
- Seydelia
- Siccia
- Sicciaemorpha
- Siculifer
- Sidyma
- Sinowatsonia
- Siopastea
- Snellenopsis
- Soganaclia
- Sonorarctia
- Soritena
- Sozusa
- Spatulosia
- Sphecops
- Sphecosoma
- Spilarctia
- Spilosoma
- Spiris
- Stauropolia
- Stenarcha
- Stenarctia
- Stenaulis
- Stenilema
- Stenopterosia
- Stenoscaptia
- Stenosia
- Stenucha
- Sterrhosia
- Sthenognatha
- Stictane
- Stictonaclia
- Stictosia
- Stidzaeras
- Stigmatophora
- Streptophlebia
- Striosia
- Sutonocrea
- Sychesia
- Sylescaptia
- Symmetrodes
- Symphlebia
- Syntomeida
- Syntomidopsis
- Syntomimorpha
- Syntomostola
- Syntrichura

== T ==
- Tajigyna
- Talara
- Talhoukia
- Tampea
- Tamsita
- Tarika
- Tatargina
- Telioneura
- Tenuinaclia
- Teracotona
- Teratopora
- Termessa
- Tesma
- Tessella
- Tessellarctia
- Tessellota
- Teulisna
- Thallarcha
- Thermeola
- Thermidarctia
- Thermograpta
- Threnosia
- Thumatha
- Thumathoides
- Thyretes
- Thyrgis
- Thyrogonia
- Thyromolis
- Thyrosticta
- Thysanoptyx
- Tigridania
- Tigrioides
- Timalus
- Tineopsis
- Tinoliodes
- Tipulodes
- Tmetoptera
- Tortricosia
- Tospitis
- Toulgoetinaclia
- Trichaeta
- Trichaetoides
- Trichareva
- Trichromia
- Trichura
- Tricypha
- Trischalis
- Trissobrocha
- Tritonaclia
- Trocodima
- Tropacme
- Tsarafidynia
- Tsirananaclia
- Tuina
- Turlinia
- Turuptiana
- Tylanthes
- Tyria

== U ==
- Uraga
- Uranophora
- Urolosia
- Urozana
- Utetheisa
- Utriculofera

== V ==
- Vadonaclia
- Vamuna
- Venedictoffia
- Vianania
- Viettesia
- Virbia
- Viviennea
- Vulmara
- Vulsinia

== W ==
- Wanderbiltia
- Watsonarctia
- Watsonidia

== X ==
- Xantharete
- Xanthetis
- Xanthoarctia
- Xantholopha
- Xanthomis
- Xanthophaeina
- Xanthopleura
- Xenosoma
- Xylecata

== Y ==
- Yelva

== Z ==
- Zadadra
- Zadadrina
- Zaevius
- Zatrephes
- Zellatilla
- Zigira
- Zobida
- Zygaenosia
