= Ameleta =

Scientific classification
- Domain: Eukaryota
- Kingdom: Animalia
- Phylum: Arthropoda
- Class: Insecta
- Order: Lepidoptera
- Superfamily: Noctuoidea
- Family: Erebidae
- Subfamily: Arctiinae
- Tribe: Lithosiini
- Genus: Ameleta; Turner, 1940
- Species: A. panochra

Binomial name
- Ameleta panochra Turner, 1940

Synonyms
- Heliosia panochra

Genus of moths

Ameleta is a monotypic moth genus in the subfamily Arctiinae. Its only species, Ameleta panochra, is found in Queensland, Australia. Both the genus and species were first described by Turner in 1940. The habitat consists of wet tropical areas.
