= Schalodeta =

Scientific classification
- Kingdom: Animalia
- Phylum: Arthropoda
- Class: Insecta
- Order: Lepidoptera
- Superfamily: Noctuoidea
- Family: Erebidae
- Subfamily: Arctiinae
- Tribe: Lithosiini
- Genus: Schalodeta; Hampson, 1914
- Species: S. fasciolata

Binomial name
- Schalodeta fasciolata (Rothschild, 1913)

Synonyms
- Caulocera fasciolata Rothschild, 1913

Genus of moths

Schalodeta is a monotypic moth genus in the family Erebidae erected by George Hampson in 1914. Its single species, Schalodeta fasciolata, was first described by Walter Rothschild in 1913. It is found in Papua New Guinea.
