= Holochrea =

Scientific classification
- Kingdom: Animalia
- Phylum: Arthropoda
- Class: Insecta
- Order: Lepidoptera
- Superfamily: Noctuoidea
- Family: Erebidae
- Subfamily: Arctiinae
- Tribe: Lithosiini
- Genus: Holochrea; Hampson, 1900
- Species: H. xanthogramma

Binomial name
- Holochrea xanthogramma Hampson, 1900

Genus of moths

Holochrea is a monotypic moth genus in the subfamily Arctiinae. Its single species, Holochrea xanthogramma, is found in the Sangihe Islands of Indonesia. Both the genus and species were first described by George Hampson in 1900.
