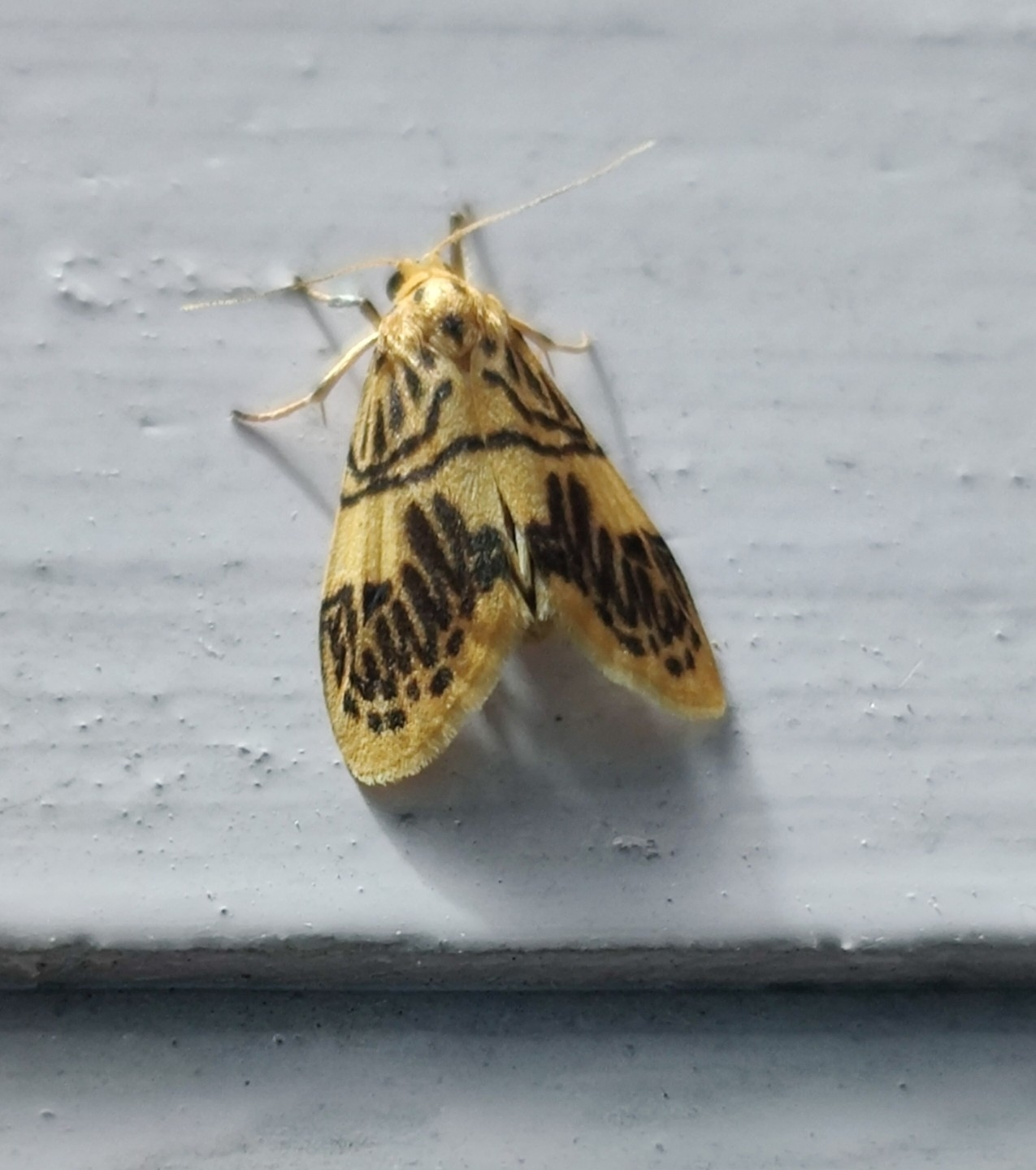
- Barsipennis joshii, India

Scientific classification
- Kingdom: Animalia
- Phylum: Arthropoda
- Class: Insecta
- Order: Lepidoptera
- Superfamily: Noctuoidea
- Family: Erebidae
- Subfamily: Arctiinae
- Tribe: Lithosiini
- Genus: Barsipennis; Volynkin, 2019

= Barsipennis =

Genus of moths

Barsipennis is a genus of moths in the family Erebidae. There are about five described species in Barsipennis, distributed through the Himalayas and northern Myanmar to northern Indochina.

== Species ==
These five species belong to the genus Barsipennis:

- Barsipennis arrigera (Volynkin & Černý, 2019)
- Barsipennis joshii (Volynkin & Černý, 2019)
- Barsipennis meyi (Volynkin & Černý, 2019)
- Barsipennis mophi (Volynkin & Černý, 2019)
- Barsipennis phaeodonta (Hampson, 1911)
