= Saozana =

Scientific classification
- Kingdom: Animalia
- Phylum: Arthropoda
- Class: Insecta
- Order: Lepidoptera
- Superfamily: Noctuoidea
- Family: Erebidae
- Subfamily: Arctiinae
- Tribe: Lithosiini
- Genus: Saozana; Dyar, 1914
- Species: S. leucota

Binomial name
- Saozana leucota (Hampson, 1901)

Synonyms
- Odozana leucota Hampson, 1901

Genus of moths

Saozana is a monotypic moth genus in the subfamily Arctiinae erected by Harrison Gray Dyar Jr. in 1914. Its single species, Saozana leucota, was first described by George Hampson in 1901. It is found in Panama.
