= Phenacomorpha =

Scientific classification
- Domain: Eukaryota
- Kingdom: Animalia
- Phylum: Arthropoda
- Class: Insecta
- Order: Lepidoptera
- Superfamily: Noctuoidea
- Family: Erebidae
- Subfamily: Arctiinae
- Tribe: Lithosiini
- Genus: Phenacomorpha; Turner, 1940
- Species: P. bisecta

Binomial name
- Phenacomorpha bisecta (T. P. Lucas, 1891)

Synonyms
- Asura bisecta T. P. Lucas, 1891; Thallarcha rhabdophora Turner, 1899

Genus of moths

Phenacomorpha is a monotypic moth genus in the subfamily Arctiinae described by Turner in 1940. Its single species, Phenacomorpha bisecta, was first described by Thomas Pennington Lucas in 1891. It is found in Australia.
