= Paradoxosia =

Scientific classification
- Kingdom: Animalia
- Phylum: Arthropoda
- Class: Insecta
- Order: Lepidoptera
- Superfamily: Noctuoidea
- Family: Erebidae
- Subfamily: Arctiinae
- Tribe: Lithosiini
- Genus: Paradoxosia; Hampson, 1918
- Species: P. rufipex

Binomial name
- Paradoxosia rufipex Hampson, 1918

Genus of moths

Paradoxosia is a genus of moths in the subfamily Arctiinae. It contains the single species Paradoxosia rufipex, which is found in Uganda.
