= Micrilema =

Scientific classification
- Kingdom: Animalia
- Phylum: Arthropoda
- Class: Insecta
- Order: Lepidoptera
- Superfamily: Noctuoidea
- Family: Erebidae
- Subfamily: Arctiinae
- Tribe: Lithosiini
- Genus: Micrilema; Hampson, 1903
- Species: M. craushayi

Binomial name
- Micrilema craushayi Hampson, 1903

Synonyms
- Micrilema crawshayi Strand, 1922

Genus of moths

Micrilema is a genus of moths in the subfamily Arctiinae. It contains the single species Micrilema craushayi, which is found in Lesotho and South Africa.
