= Neardonaea =

Scientific classification
- Domain: Eukaryota
- Kingdom: Animalia
- Phylum: Arthropoda
- Class: Insecta
- Order: Lepidoptera
- Superfamily: Noctuoidea
- Family: Erebidae
- Subfamily: Arctiinae
- Tribe: Lithosiini
- Genus: Neardonaea; Gaede, 1925
- Species: N. metallica

Binomial name
- Neardonaea metallica Gaede, 1925

Genus of moths

Neardonaea is a genus of moths in the subfamily Arctiinae. It contains the single species Neardonaea metallica, which is found in Venezuela.
