= Geridixis =

Scientific classification
- Kingdom: Animalia
- Phylum: Arthropoda
- Class: Insecta
- Order: Lepidoptera
- Superfamily: Noctuoidea
- Family: Erebidae
- Subfamily: Arctiinae
- Tribe: Lithosiini
- Genus: Geridixis; Dyar, 1914
- Species: G. minx

Binomial name
- Geridixis minx Dyar, 1914

Genus of moths

Geridixis is a monotypic moth genus in the subfamily Arctiinae. Its single species, Geridixis minx, is found in Panama. Both the genus and species were first described by Harrison Gray Dyar Jr. in 1914.
