= Lomuna =

Scientific classification
- Domain: Eukaryota
- Kingdom: Animalia
- Phylum: Arthropoda
- Class: Insecta
- Order: Lepidoptera
- Superfamily: Noctuoidea
- Family: Erebidae
- Subfamily: Arctiinae
- Tribe: Lithosiini
- Genus: Lomuna; Field, 1952
- Species: L. nigripuncta

Binomial name
- Lomuna nigripuncta (Hampson, 1900)

Synonyms
- Mulona nigripuncta Hampson, 1900

Genus of moths

Lomuna is a monotypic moth genus in the subfamily Arctiinae erected by William D. Field in 1952. Its single species, Lomuna nigripuncta, was first described by George Hampson in 1900. It is found in Puerto Rico and Colombia.
