= Leptopepla =

Scientific classification
- Kingdom: Animalia
- Phylum: Arthropoda
- Class: Insecta
- Order: Lepidoptera
- Superfamily: Noctuoidea
- Family: Erebidae
- Subfamily: Arctiinae
- Tribe: Lithosiini
- Genus: Leptopepla; Hampson, 1900
- Species: L. procridiformis

Binomial name
- Leptopepla procridiformis Hampson, 1900

Genus of moths

Leptopepla is a monotypic moth genus in the subfamily Arctiinae. Its single species, Leptopepla procridiformis, is found from Bolivia and eastern Peru. Both the genus and species were first described by George Hampson in 1900.
