= Dotha =

Scientific classification
- Kingdom: Animalia
- Phylum: Arthropoda
- Class: Insecta
- Order: Lepidoptera
- Superfamily: Noctuoidea
- Family: Erebidae
- Subfamily: Arctiinae
- Tribe: Lithosiini
- Genus: Dotha; Walker, 1865
- Species: D. ctenuchoides

Binomial name
- Dotha ctenuchoides Walker, 1864

Genus of moths

Dotha is a genus of moths in the subfamily Arctiinae. It contains the single species Dotha ctenuchoides, which is found in Sumatra.
