= Pareugoa =

Scientific classification
- Kingdom: Animalia
- Phylum: Arthropoda
- Class: Insecta
- Order: Lepidoptera
- Superfamily: Noctuoidea
- Family: Erebidae
- Subfamily: Arctiinae
- Tribe: Lithosiini
- Genus: Pareugoa; Hampson, 1900
- Species: P. multistrigata

Binomial name
- Pareugoa multistrigata (Hampson, 1898)

Synonyms
- Eugoa multistrigata Hampson, 1898

Genus of moths

Pareugoa is a monotypic moth genus in the subfamily Arctiinae. Its single species, Pareugoa multistrigata, is found in Assam, India. Both the genus and species were first described by George Hampson, the genus in 1900 and the species two years earlier.
