= Neosiccia =

Scientific classification
- Domain: Eukaryota
- Kingdom: Animalia
- Phylum: Arthropoda
- Class: Insecta
- Order: Lepidoptera
- Superfamily: Noctuoidea
- Family: Erebidae
- Subfamily: Arctiinae
- Tribe: Lithosiini
- Genus: Neosiccia van Eecke, 1926
- Species: N. accurata

Binomial name
- Neosiccia accurata van Eecke, 1927

Genus of moths

Neosiccia is a genus of moths in the subfamily Arctiinae. It contains the single species Neosiccia accurata, which is found on Sumatra.
