= Tineopsis =

Scientific classification
- Domain: Eukaryota
- Kingdom: Animalia
- Phylum: Arthropoda
- Class: Insecta
- Order: Lepidoptera
- Superfamily: Noctuoidea
- Family: Erebidae
- Subfamily: Arctiinae
- Tribe: Lithosiini
- Genus: Tineopsis; Felder, 1861
- Species: T. saturata

Binomial name
- Tineopsis saturata Felder, 1861

Genus of moths

Tineopsis is a genus of moths in the subfamily Arctiinae. It contains the single species Tineopsis saturata, which is found on Ambon Island.
