= Trichareva =

Scientific classification
- Domain: Eukaryota
- Kingdom: Animalia
- Phylum: Arthropoda
- Class: Insecta
- Order: Lepidoptera
- Superfamily: Noctuoidea
- Family: Erebidae
- Subfamily: Arctiinae
- Tribe: Lithosiini
- Genus: Trichareva; Dognin, 1914
- Species: T. fulvilaniata

Binomial name
- Trichareva fulvilaniata Dognin, 1914

Genus of moths

Trichareva is a genus of moths in the subfamily Arctiinae. It contains the single species Trichareva fulvilaniata, which is found in Panama and Costa Rica.
