= Pseudophanes =

Scientific classification
- Domain: Eukaryota
- Kingdom: Animalia
- Phylum: Arthropoda
- Class: Insecta
- Order: Lepidoptera
- Superfamily: Noctuoidea
- Family: Erebidae
- Subfamily: Arctiinae
- Tribe: Lithosiini
- Genus: Pseudophanes; Turner, 1940
- Species: P. melanoptera

Binomial name
- Pseudophanes melanoptera Turner, 1940

Genus of moths

Pseudophanes is a genus of moths in the subfamily Arctiinae. Its single species, Pseudophanes melanoptera, is found in Australia. Both the genus and species were first described by Turner in 1940.
