= Pliniola =

Scientific classification
- Domain: Eukaryota
- Kingdom: Animalia
- Phylum: Arthropoda
- Class: Insecta
- Order: Lepidoptera
- Superfamily: Noctuoidea
- Family: Erebidae
- Subfamily: Arctiinae
- Tribe: Lithosiini
- Genus: Pliniola; Strand, 1912
- Species: P. gibba

Binomial name
- Pliniola gibba (Plötz, 1880)

Synonyms
- Paidia gibba Plötz, 1880; Tegulata nigristriata Holland, 1893

Genus of moths

Pliniola is a monotypic moth genus in the subfamily Arctiinae described by Strand in 1912. Its single species, Pliniola gibba, was first described by Plötz in 1880. It is found in Cameroon, the Republic of the Congo and Ghana.
