= Apogurea =

Scientific classification
- Domain: Eukaryota
- Kingdom: Animalia
- Phylum: Arthropoda
- Class: Insecta
- Order: Lepidoptera
- Superfamily: Noctuoidea
- Family: Erebidae
- Subfamily: Arctiinae
- Tribe: Lithosiini
- Genus: Apogurea; Watson, Fletcher & Nye, 1980
- Species: A. grisescens

Binomial name
- Apogurea grisescens (Daniel, 1951)

Synonyms
- Parasiccia grisescens Daniel, 1951

Genus of moths

Apogurea is a monotypic moth genus in the subfamily Arctiinae erected by Watson, Fletcher and Nye in 1980. Its single species, Apogurea grisescens, was first described by Franz Daniel in 1951. It is found in Zhejiang, China.
