= Nipponasura =

Scientific classification
- Kingdom: Animalia
- Phylum: Arthropoda
- Class: Insecta
- Order: Lepidoptera
- Superfamily: Noctuoidea
- Family: Erebidae
- Subfamily: Arctiinae
- Tribe: Lithosiini
- Genus: Nipponasura; Inoue, 1965
- Species: N. sanguinea

Binomial name
- Nipponasura sanguinea Inoue, 1965

Genus of moths

Nipponasura is a monotypic moth genus in the subfamily Arctiinae. Its single species, Nipponasura sanguinea, is found in Japan. Both the genus and species were first described by Hiroshi Inoue in 1965.
