= Didymonyx =

Scientific classification
- Kingdom: Animalia
- Phylum: Arthropoda
- Class: Insecta
- Order: Lepidoptera
- Superfamily: Noctuoidea
- Family: Erebidae
- Subfamily: Arctiinae
- Tribe: Lithosiini
- Genus: Didymonyx; Watson, 1980
- Species: D. infumata

Binomial name
- Didymonyx infumata (Hampson, 1900)

Synonyms
- Diplonyx Hampson, 1900 (preocc.); Diplonyx infumata Hampson, 1900

Genus of moths

Didymonyx is a genus of moths in the subfamily Arctiinae. It contains the single species Didymonyx infumata, which is found in South Africa.
