= Tropacme =

Scientific classification
- Kingdom: Animalia
- Phylum: Arthropoda
- Class: Insecta
- Order: Lepidoptera
- Superfamily: Noctuoidea
- Family: Erebidae
- Subfamily: Arctiinae
- Tribe: Lithosiini
- Genus: Tropacme; Hampson, 1894
- Species: T. cupreimargo

Binomial name
- Tropacme cupreimargo Hampson, 1894

Genus of moths

Tropacme is a monotypic moth genus in the subfamily Arctiinae. Its single species, Tropacme cupreimargo, is found in Myanmar and Assam, India. The species and the genus were first described by George Hampson in 1894.
