= Leucorhodia =

Scientific classification
- Kingdom: Animalia
- Phylum: Arthropoda
- Class: Insecta
- Order: Lepidoptera
- Superfamily: Noctuoidea
- Family: Erebidae
- Subfamily: Arctiinae
- Tribe: Lithosiini
- Genus: Leucorhodia; Hampson, 1900
- Species: L. ragua

Binomial name
- Leucorhodia ragua (Druce, 1897)

Synonyms
- Lithosia ragua Druce, 1897

Genus of moths

Leucorhodia is a genus of moths in the subfamily Arctiinae. It contains the single species Leucorhodia ragua, which is found in Guatemala.
