= Yelva =

Scientific classification
- Domain: Eukaryota
- Kingdom: Animalia
- Phylum: Arthropoda
- Class: Insecta
- Order: Lepidoptera
- Superfamily: Noctuoidea
- Family: Erebidae
- Subfamily: Arctiinae
- Tribe: Lithosiini
- Genus: Yelva; Birket-Smith, 1965
- Species: Y. obscura

Binomial name
- Yelva obscura Birket-Smith, 1965

Genus of moths

Yelva is a genus of moths in the subfamily Arctiinae. It contains the single species Yelva obscura, which is found in Nigeria.
