= Nolinophanes =

Scientific classification
- Domain: Eukaryota
- Kingdom: Animalia
- Phylum: Arthropoda
- Class: Insecta
- Order: Lepidoptera
- Superfamily: Noctuoidea
- Family: Erebidae
- Subfamily: Arctiinae
- Tribe: Lithosiini
- Genus: Nolinophanes; Hulstaert, 1924
- Species: N. sicciaecolor

Binomial name
- Nolinophanes sicciaecolor Hulstaert, 1924

Genus of moths

Nolinophanes is a genus of moths in the subfamily Arctiinae. It contains the single species Nolinophanes sicciaecolor, which is found on the Tenimbar Islands.
