= Deloplotela =

Scientific classification
- Kingdom: Animalia
- Phylum: Arthropoda
- Class: Insecta
- Order: Lepidoptera
- Superfamily: Noctuoidea
- Family: Erebidae
- Subfamily: Arctiinae
- Tribe: Lithosiini
- Genus: Deloplotela; Hulstaert, 1924
- Species: D. minuta

Binomial name
- Deloplotela minuta Hulstaert, 1924

Genus of moths

Deloplotela is a genus of moth in the subfamily Arctiinae. It contains the single species Deloplotela minuta, which is found on the Tenimbar Islands.
