= Procridia =

Scientific classification
- Kingdom: Animalia
- Phylum: Arthropoda
- Class: Insecta
- Order: Lepidoptera
- Superfamily: Noctuoidea
- Family: Erebidae
- Subfamily: Arctiinae
- Tribe: Lithosiini
- Genus: Procridia; Hampson, 1900
- Species: P. metallica

Binomial name
- Procridia metallica (Dognin, 1897)

Synonyms
- Odozana metallica Dognin, 1897

Genus of moths

Procridia is a monotypic moth genus in the subfamily Arctiinae erected by George Hampson in 1900. Its single species, Procridia metallica, was first described by Paul Dognin in 1897. It is found in Ecuador.
