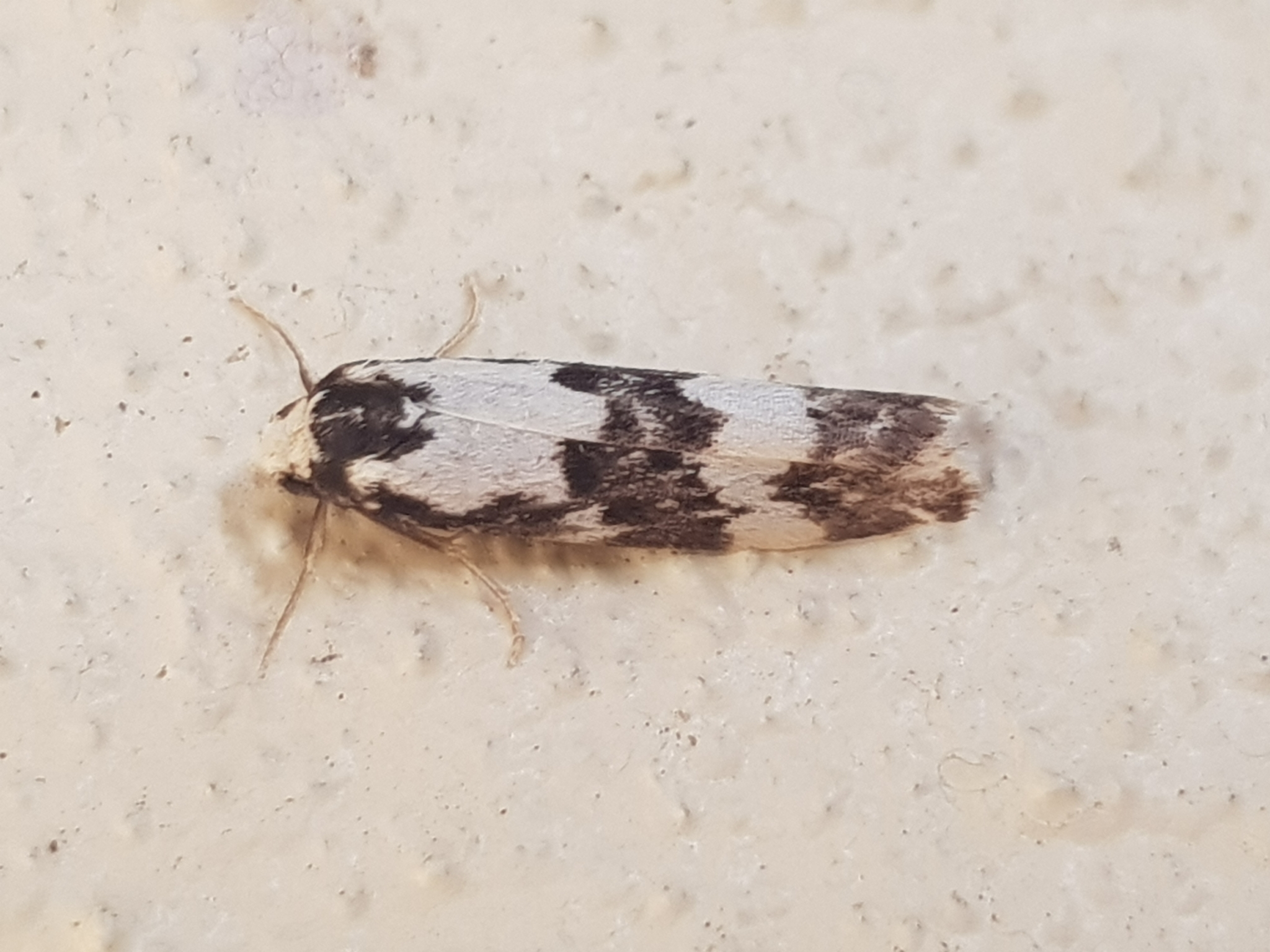

Scientific classification
- Domain: Eukaryota
- Kingdom: Animalia
- Phylum: Arthropoda
- Class: Insecta
- Order: Lepidoptera
- Superfamily: Noctuoidea
- Family: Erebidae
- Subfamily: Arctiinae
- Tribe: Lithosiini
- Genus: Arrhythmica; Turner, 1940
- Species: A. semifusca

Binomial name
- Arrhythmica semifusca Turner, 1940

= Arrhythmica =

Genus of moths

Arrhythmica is a genus of moths in the subfamily Arctiinae. It is monotypic, with the single species, Arrhythmica semifusca, found in Australia. Both the genus and species were first described by Alfred Jefferis Turner in 1940.
