= Stenosia =

Scientific classification
- Kingdom: Animalia
- Phylum: Arthropoda
- Class: Insecta
- Order: Lepidoptera
- Superfamily: Noctuoidea
- Family: Erebidae
- Subfamily: Arctiinae
- Tribe: Lithosiini
- Genus: Stenosia; Hampson, 1900
- Species: S. rufeola

Binomial name
- Stenosia rufeola Hampson, 1900

Genus of moths

Stenosia is a monotypic moth genus in the subfamily Arctiinae. Its single species, Stenosia rufeola, is found on Bali in Indonesia. Both the genus and species were first described by George Hampson in 1900.
