= Microstola =

Scientific classification
- Domain: Eukaryota
- Kingdom: Animalia
- Phylum: Arthropoda
- Class: Insecta
- Order: Lepidoptera
- Superfamily: Noctuoidea
- Family: Erebidae
- Subfamily: Arctiinae
- Tribe: Lithosiini
- Genus: Microstola; Lower, 1920
- Species: M. ammoscia

Binomial name
- Microstola ammoscia Lower, 1920

Synonyms
- Aclytophanes Turner, 1940; Microstola ammoscia Lower, 1920; Heliosia aedumena Turner, 1922

Genus of moths

Microstola is a monotypic moth genus in the subfamily Arctiinae. Its single species, Microstola ammoscia, is found in Australia, where it has been recorded from Queensland. Both the genus and species were first described by Oswald Bertram Lower in 1920. The habitat consists of wet tropics.

Adults are pale brown, except for two dark spots on the forewings.
