= Anaulosia =

Scientific classification
- Domain: Eukaryota
- Kingdom: Animalia
- Phylum: Arthropoda
- Class: Insecta
- Order: Lepidoptera
- Superfamily: Noctuoidea
- Family: Erebidae
- Subfamily: Arctiinae
- Tribe: Lithosiini
- Genus: Anaulosia; Schaus, 1911
- Species: A. impolita

Binomial name
- Anaulosia impolita Schaus, 1911

Genus of moths

Anaulosia is a monotypic moth genus in the subfamily Arctiinae. Its single species, Anaulosia impolita, is found in Costa Rica. Both the genus and species were first described by William Schaus in 1911.
