= Paraonagylla =

Scientific classification
- Kingdom: Animalia
- Phylum: Arthropoda
- Class: Insecta
- Order: Lepidoptera
- Superfamily: Noctuoidea
- Family: Erebidae
- Subfamily: Arctiinae
- Tribe: Lithosiini
- Genus: Paraonagylla; Berio, 1939
- Species: P. zavattarii

Binomial name
- Paraonagylla zavattarii Berio, 1939

Genus of moths

Paraonagylla is a genus of moths in the subfamily Arctiinae. It contains the single species Paraonagylla zavattarii, which is found in Ethiopia.
