= Siculifer =

Scientific classification
- Kingdom: Animalia
- Phylum: Arthropoda
- Class: Insecta
- Order: Lepidoptera
- Superfamily: Noctuoidea
- Family: Erebidae
- Subfamily: Arctiinae
- Tribe: Lithosiini
- Genus: Siculifer; Hampson, 1896
- Species: S. bilineatus

Binomial name
- Siculifer bilineatus Hampson, 1896

Genus of moths

Siculifer is a monotypic moth genus in the subfamily Arctiinae. Its single species, Siculifer bilineatus, is found in Assam, India. Both the genus and species were first described by George Hampson in 1896.
