= Euzeugapteryx =

Scientific classification
- Kingdom: Animalia
- Phylum: Arthropoda
- Class: Insecta
- Order: Lepidoptera
- Superfamily: Noctuoidea
- Family: Erebidae
- Subfamily: Arctiinae
- Tribe: Lithosiini
- Genus: Euzeugapteryx; Dyar, 1905
- Species: E. speciosa

Binomial name
- Euzeugapteryx speciosa Schaus, 1905

Genus of moths

Euzeugapteryx is a genus of moths in the subfamily Arctiinae. It contains the single species Euzeugapteryx speciosa, which is found in French Guiana.
