= Diadesmola =

Scientific classification
- Kingdom: Animalia
- Phylum: Arthropoda
- Class: Insecta
- Order: Lepidoptera
- Superfamily: Noctuoidea
- Family: Erebidae
- Subfamily: Arctiinae
- Tribe: Lithosiini
- Genus: Diadesmola; Hulstaert, 1924
- Species: D. bicolor

Binomial name
- Diadesmola bicolor Hulstaert, 1924

Genus of moths

Diadesmola is a genus of moths in the subfamily Arctiinae. It contains the single species Diadesmola bicolor, which is found in Irian Jaya.
