= Euclemensoides =

Scientific classification
- Domain: Eukaryota
- Kingdom: Animalia
- Phylum: Arthropoda
- Class: Insecta
- Order: Lepidoptera
- Superfamily: Noctuoidea
- Family: Erebidae
- Subfamily: Arctiinae
- Tribe: Lithosiini
- Genus: Euclemensoides; Strand, 1922
- Species: E. umbrata

Binomial name
- Euclemensoides umbrata (Dognin, 1914)

Synonyms
- Euclemensia Dognin, 1914 (non Grote, 1878: preoccupied); Euclemensia umbrata Dognin, 1914

Genus of moths

Euclemensoides is a genus of moths in the subfamily Arctiinae. It contains the single species Euclemensoides umbrata, which is found in Colombia.
