= Metagylla =

Scientific classification
- Kingdom: Animalia
- Phylum: Arthropoda
- Class: Insecta
- Order: Lepidoptera
- Superfamily: Noctuoidea
- Family: Erebidae
- Subfamily: Arctiinae
- Tribe: Lithosiini
- Genus: Metagylla; Hampson, 1907
- Species: M. miroides

Binomial name
- Metagylla miroides Hampson, 1907

Genus of moths

Metagylla is a genus of moths in the subfamily Arctiinae. It contains the single species Metagylla miroides, which is found in French Guiana.
