= Melastrota =

Scientific classification
- Kingdom: Animalia
- Phylum: Arthropoda
- Class: Insecta
- Order: Lepidoptera
- Superfamily: Noctuoidea
- Family: Erebidae
- Subfamily: Arctiinae
- Tribe: Lithosiini
- Genus: Melastrota; Hampson, 1905
- Species: M. nigrisquamata

Binomial name
- Melastrota nigrisquamata (Swinhoe, 1901)

Synonyms
- Pseudoblabes nigrisquamata Swinhoe, 1901; Pseudoblabes dona Swinhoe, 1901

Genus of moths

Melastrota is a monotypic moth genus in the subfamily Arctiinae erected by George Hampson in 1905. Its only species, Melastrota nigrisquamata, was described by Swinhoe in 1901. It is found in Australia, where it has been recorded from Queensland.
