= Brachiosia =

Scientific classification
- Kingdom: Animalia
- Phylum: Arthropoda
- Class: Insecta
- Order: Lepidoptera
- Superfamily: Noctuoidea
- Family: Erebidae
- Subfamily: Arctiinae
- Tribe: Lithosiini
- Genus: Brachiosia; Hampson, 1900
- Species: B. castaneola

Binomial name
- Brachiosia castaneola Hampson, 1900

Genus of moths

Brachiosia is a monotypic moth genus in the subfamily Arctiinae. Its only species, Brachiosia castaneola, is found on the Sangihe Islands of Indonesia. Both the genus and species were first described by George Hampson in 1900.
