= Gylla =

Scientific classification
- Kingdom: Animalia
- Phylum: Arthropoda
- Class: Insecta
- Order: Lepidoptera
- Superfamily: Noctuoidea
- Family: Erebidae
- Subfamily: Arctiinae
- Tribe: Lithosiini
- Genus: Gylla; Bryk, 1953
- Species: G. crotalistria

Binomial name
- Gylla crotalistria Bryk, 1953

Genus of moths

Gylla is a genus of moths in the subfamily Arctiinae. It contains the single species Gylla crotalistria, which is found in Brazil.
