= Hobapromea =

Scientific classification
- Domain: Eukaryota
- Kingdom: Animalia
- Phylum: Arthropoda
- Class: Insecta
- Order: Lepidoptera
- Superfamily: Noctuoidea
- Family: Erebidae
- Subfamily: Arctiinae
- Tribe: Lithosiini
- Genus: Hobapromea; Watson, 1980
- Species: H. cleta

Binomial name
- Hobapromea cleta (Turner, 1940)

Synonyms
- Baeomorpha Turner, 1940 (preocc. Brues, 1937); Baeomorpha cleta Turner, 1940

Genus of moths

Hobapromea is a monotypic moth genus in the subfamily Arctiinae described by Watson in 1980. Its single species, Hobapromea cleta, was first described by Turner in 1940. It is found in Queensland, Australia.
