= Bryantia =

Scientific classification
- Domain: Eukaryota
- Kingdom: Animalia
- Phylum: Arthropoda
- Class: Insecta
- Order: Lepidoptera
- Superfamily: Noctuoidea
- Family: Erebidae
- Subfamily: Arctiinae
- Tribe: Lithosiini
- Genus: Bryantia; Schaus, 1922
- Species: B. caudata

Binomial name
- Bryantia caudata Schaus, 1922

Genus of moths

Bryantia is a genus of moths in the subfamily Arctiinae. It contains the single species Bryantia caudata, which is found on Java.
