= Lymantriopsis =

Scientific classification
- Kingdom: Animalia
- Phylum: Arthropoda
- Class: Insecta
- Order: Lepidoptera
- Superfamily: Noctuoidea
- Family: Erebidae
- Subfamily: Arctiinae
- Tribe: Lithosiini
- Genus: Lymantriopsis; Hampson, 1900
- Species: L. lacteata

Binomial name
- Lymantriopsis lacteata (Holland, 1893)

Synonyms
- Nudaria lacteata Holland, 1893

Genus of moths

Lymantriopsis is a genus of moths in the subfamily Arctiinae. It contains the single species Lymantriopsis lacteata, which is found in Gabon.
