= Apothosia =

Scientific classification
- Kingdom: Animalia
- Phylum: Arthropoda
- Class: Insecta
- Order: Lepidoptera
- Superfamily: Noctuoidea
- Family: Erebidae
- Subfamily: Arctiinae
- Tribe: Lithosiini
- Genus: Apothosia; Hampson, 1918
- Species: A. conformis

Binomial name
- Apothosia conformis Hampson, 1918

Genus of moths

Apothosia is a genus of moths in the subfamily Arctiinae. It was described by George Hampson in 1918 and contains the species Apothosia conformis, which is found in Malawi.
