= Ranghana =

Scientific classification
- Domain: Eukaryota
- Kingdom: Animalia
- Phylum: Arthropoda
- Class: Insecta
- Order: Lepidoptera
- Superfamily: Noctuoidea
- Family: Erebidae
- Subfamily: Arctiinae
- Tribe: Lithosiini
- Genus: Ranghana; Moore, 1878
- Species: R. punctata

Binomial name
- Ranghana punctata Moore, 1878

Genus of moths

Ranghana is a genus of moths in the subfamily Arctiinae. It contains the single species Ranghana punctata, which is found in India.
