= Snellenopsis =

Scientific classification
- Domain: Eukaryota
- Kingdom: Animalia
- Phylum: Arthropoda
- Class: Insecta
- Order: Lepidoptera
- Superfamily: Noctuoidea
- Family: Erebidae
- Subfamily: Arctiinae
- Tribe: Lithosiini
- Genus: Snellenopsis van Eecke, 1920
- Species: S. mimetica

Binomial name
- Snellenopsis mimetica van Eecke, 1920

Genus of moths

Snellenopsis is a genus of moths in the subfamily Arctiinae. It contains the single species Snellenopsis mimetica, which is found on Java.
