= Stenarcha =

Scientific classification
- Kingdom: Animalia
- Phylum: Arthropoda
- Class: Insecta
- Order: Lepidoptera
- Superfamily: Noctuoidea
- Family: Erebidae
- Subfamily: Arctiinae
- Tribe: Lithosiini
- Genus: Stenarcha; Hampson, 1900
- Species: S. stenopa

Binomial name
- Stenarcha stenopa (Meyrick, 1886)

Synonyms
- Chiriphe stenopa Meyrick, 1886

Genus of moths

Stenarcha is a monotypic moth genus in the subfamily Arctiinae erected by George Hampson in 1900. Its single species, Stenarcha stenopa, was first described by Edward Meyrick in 1886. It is found in the southern part of the Australian state of Western Australia.

The forewings are patterned in grey, black and brown. The hindwings are grey.

The larvae probably feed on lichens.
