= Neotalara =

Scientific classification
- Kingdom: Animalia
- Phylum: Arthropoda
- Class: Insecta
- Order: Lepidoptera
- Superfamily: Noctuoidea
- Family: Erebidae
- Subfamily: Arctiinae
- Tribe: Lithosiini
- Genus: Neotalara; Hampson, 1914
- Species: N. metamelaena

Binomial name
- Neotalara metamelaena Hampson, 1914

Genus of moths

Neotalara is a genus of moths in the subfamily Arctiinae. It contains the single species Neotalara metamelaena, which is found in Ecuador.
