= Neagylla =

Scientific classification
- Kingdom: Animalia
- Phylum: Arthropoda
- Class: Insecta
- Order: Lepidoptera
- Superfamily: Noctuoidea
- Family: Erebidae
- Subfamily: Arctiinae
- Tribe: Lithosiini
- Genus: Neagylla; Hampson, 1900
- Species: N. nevosa

Binomial name
- Neagylla nevosa (Dognin, 1894)

Synonyms
- Areva nevosa Dognin, 1894

Genus of moths

Neagylla is a monotypic moth genus in the subfamily Arctiinae erected by George Hampson in 1900. Its single species, Neagylla nevosa, was first described by Paul Dognin in 1894. It is found in Ecuador.
