= Lamprosiella =

Scientific classification
- Domain: Eukaryota
- Kingdom: Animalia
- Phylum: Arthropoda
- Class: Insecta
- Order: Lepidoptera
- Superfamily: Noctuoidea
- Family: Erebidae
- Subfamily: Arctiinae
- Tribe: Lithosiini
- Genus: Lamprosiella; Collins, 1962
- Species: L. eborella

Binomial name
- Lamprosiella eborella (Boisduval, 1847)

Synonyms
- Generic: Lamprosia Hampson, 1900 (non Hübner, [1821]: preoccupied); Specific: Lithosia eborella Boisduval, 1847; Lamprosia eborella; Lithosia pygmaea Walker, 1854

Genus of moths

Lamprosiella is a monotypic moth genus in the subfamily Arctiinae erected by R. J. Collins in 1962. Its only species, Lamprosiella eborella, was described by Jean Baptiste Boisduval in 1847. It is found in South Africa and Tanzania.
