= Clemendana =

Scientific classification
- Domain: Eukaryota
- Kingdom: Animalia
- Phylum: Arthropoda
- Class: Insecta
- Order: Lepidoptera
- Superfamily: Noctuoidea
- Family: Erebidae
- Subfamily: Arctiinae
- Tribe: Lithosiini
- Genus: Clemendana; Schaus, 1929
- Species: C. pacifera

Binomial name
- Clemendana pacifera Schaus, 1929

Genus of moths

Clemendana is a monotypic moth genus in the subfamily Arctiinae. Its single species, Clemendana pacifera, is found in Brazil. Both the genus and species were first described by William Schaus in 1929.
