= Blabioides =

Scientific classification
- Kingdom: Animalia
- Phylum: Arthropoda
- Class: Insecta
- Order: Lepidoptera
- Superfamily: Noctuoidea
- Family: Erebidae
- Subfamily: Arctiinae
- Tribe: Lithosiini
- Genus: Blabioides; Hampson, 1900
- Species: B. snelleni

Binomial name
- Blabioides snelleni (Ritsema, 1875)

Synonyms
- Pseudoblabes snelleni Ritsema, 1875

Genus of moths

Blabioides is a monotypic moth genus in the subfamily Arctiinae erected by George Hampson in 1900. Its only species, Blabioides snelleni, was first described by Ritsema in 1900. It is found on Java in Indonesia.
