= Paratalara =

Scientific classification
- Kingdom: Animalia
- Phylum: Arthropoda
- Class: Insecta
- Order: Lepidoptera
- Superfamily: Noctuoidea
- Family: Erebidae
- Subfamily: Arctiinae
- Tribe: Lithosiini
- Genus: Paratalara; Dyar, 1905
- Species: P. inversa

Binomial name
- Paratalara inversa Schaus, 1905

Genus of moths

Paratalara is a genus of moths in the subfamily Arctiinae. It contains the single species Paratalara inversa, which is found in French Guiana.
