= Nephelosia =

Scientific classification
- Kingdom: Animalia
- Phylum: Arthropoda
- Class: Insecta
- Order: Lepidoptera
- Superfamily: Noctuoidea
- Family: Erebidae
- Subfamily: Arctiinae
- Tribe: Lithosiini
- Genus: Nephelosia; Hampson, 1900
- Species: N. caecina

Binomial name
- Nephelosia caecina (H. Druce, 1897)

Synonyms
- Lithosia caecina H. Druce, 1897

Genus of moths

Nephelosia is a monotypic moth genus in the subfamily Arctiinae erected by George Hampson in 1900. Its single species, Nephelosia caecina, was first described by Herbert Druce in 1897. It is found in Guatemala.
