= Hanoisiella =

Scientific classification
- Domain: Eukaryota
- Kingdom: Animalia
- Phylum: Arthropoda
- Class: Insecta
- Order: Lepidoptera
- Superfamily: Noctuoidea
- Family: Erebidae
- Subfamily: Arctiinae
- Tribe: Lithosiini
- Genus: Hanoisiella de Joannis, 1928
- Species: H. exilicosta

Binomial name
- Hanoisiella exilicosta de Joannis, 1928

Genus of moths

Hanoisiella is a monotypic moth genus in the subfamily Arctiinae described by Joseph de Joannis in 1928. It contains the single species Hanoisiella exilicosta, which is found in China (Tonkin).
