= Eugraphosia =

Scientific classification
- Kingdom: Animalia
- Phylum: Arthropoda
- Class: Insecta
- Order: Lepidoptera
- Superfamily: Noctuoidea
- Family: Erebidae
- Subfamily: Arctiinae
- Tribe: Lithosiini
- Genus: Eugraphosia; Hampson, 1918
- Species: E. rubrizonea

Binomial name
- Eugraphosia rubrizonea Hampson, 1918

Genus of moths

Eugraphosia is a genus of moths in the subfamily Arctiinae. It contains the single species Eugraphosia rubrizonea, which is found in Peru.
