= Costarcha =

Scientific classification
- Kingdom: Animalia
- Phylum: Arthropoda
- Class: Insecta
- Order: Lepidoptera
- Superfamily: Noctuoidea
- Family: Erebidae
- Subfamily: Arctiinae
- Tribe: Lithosiini
- Genus: Costarcha; Hampson, 1891
- Species: C. indistincta

Binomial name
- Costarcha indistincta Hampson, 1891

Genus of moths

Costarcha is a monotypic moth genus in the subfamily Arctiinae. Its single species, Costarcha indistincta, is found in India's Nilgiri Mountains. Both the genus and species were first described by George Hampson in 1891.
