= Grucia =

Scientific classification
- Kingdom: Animalia
- Phylum: Arthropoda
- Class: Insecta
- Order: Lepidoptera
- Superfamily: Noctuoidea
- Family: Erebidae
- Subfamily: Arctiinae
- Tribe: Lithosiini
- Genus: Grucia; Dyar, 1916
- Species: G. monacheicauda

Binomial name
- Grucia monacheicauda Dyar, 1916

Genus of moths

Grucia is a genus of moths in the subfamily Arctiinae. It contains the single species Grucia monacheicauda, which is found in Mexico.
