= Ateucheta =

Scientific classification
- Domain: Eukaryota
- Kingdom: Animalia
- Phylum: Arthropoda
- Class: Insecta
- Order: Lepidoptera
- Superfamily: Noctuoidea
- Family: Erebidae
- Subfamily: Arctiinae
- Tribe: Lithosiini
- Genus: Ateucheta; Turner, 1940
- Species: A. zatesima

Binomial name
- Ateucheta zatesima (Hampson, 1914)

Synonyms
- Poliosia zatesima Hampson, 1914; Poliosia zetesima Turner, 1914

Genus of moths

Ateucheta is a monotypic moth genus in the subfamily Arctiinae erected by Alfred Jefferis Turner in 1940. Its single species, Ateucheta zatesima, was first described by George Hampson in 1914. It is found in Australia.
