= Castronia =

Scientific classification
- Domain: Eukaryota
- Kingdom: Animalia
- Phylum: Arthropoda
- Class: Insecta
- Order: Lepidoptera
- Superfamily: Noctuoidea
- Family: Erebidae
- Subfamily: Arctiinae
- Tribe: Lithosiini
- Genus: Castronia; E. D. Jones, 1912
- Species: C. apostata

Binomial name
- Castronia apostata (Schaus, 1905)

Synonyms
- Tessellota apostata Schaus, 1905; Tessella apostata; Castronia collaris E. D. Jones, 1912

Genus of moths

Castronia is a monotypic moth genus in the subfamily Arctiinae erected by E. Dukinfield Jones in 1912. Its only species, Castronia apostata, was first described by Schaus in 1905. It is found in Brazil.
