= Cyclosticta =

Scientific classification
- Kingdom: Animalia
- Phylum: Arthropoda
- Class: Insecta
- Order: Lepidoptera
- Superfamily: Noctuoidea
- Family: Erebidae
- Subfamily: Arctiinae
- Tribe: Lithosiini
- Genus: Cyclosticta; Schaus, 1899
- Species: C. discata

Binomial name
- Cyclosticta discata Schaus, 1899

Genus of moths

Cyclosticta is a monotypic moth genus in the subfamily Arctiinae. Its single species, Cyclosticta discata, is found in Rio de Janeiro, Brazil. Both the genus and species were first described by William Schaus in 1899.
