= Heterotropa =

Scientific classification
- Domain: Eukaryota
- Kingdom: Animalia
- Phylum: Arthropoda
- Class: Insecta
- Order: Lepidoptera
- Superfamily: Noctuoidea
- Family: Erebidae
- Subfamily: Arctiinae
- Tribe: Lithosiini
- Genus: Heterotropa; Turner, 1940
- Species: H. fastosa

Binomial name
- Heterotropa fastosa Turner, 1940

Genus of moths

Heterotropa is a monotypic moth genus in the subfamily Arctiinae. Its single species, Heterotropa fastosa, is found in Australia's Northern Territory and Queensland. Both the genus and species were first described by Turner in 1940.

The forewings have a bold pattern of yellow, brown and white.
