= Phaulosia =

Scientific classification
- Kingdom: Animalia
- Phylum: Arthropoda
- Class: Insecta
- Order: Lepidoptera
- Superfamily: Noctuoidea
- Family: Erebidae
- Subfamily: Arctiinae
- Tribe: Lithosiini
- Genus: Phaulosia; Hampson, 1900
- Species: P. sordida

Binomial name
- Phaulosia sordida (Butler, 1878)

Synonyms
- Eudoliche sordida Butler, 1878

Genus of moths

Phaulosia is a monotypic moth genus in the subfamily Arctiinae erected by George Hampson in 1900. Its single species, Phaulosia sordida, was first described by Arthur Gardiner Butler in 1878. It is found in the Amazon region.
