= Asythosia =

Scientific classification
- Kingdom: Animalia
- Phylum: Arthropoda
- Class: Insecta
- Order: Lepidoptera
- Superfamily: Noctuoidea
- Family: Erebidae
- Subfamily: Arctiinae
- Tribe: Lithosiini
- Genus: Asythosia; Birket-Smith, 1965
- Species: A. velutina

Binomial name
- Asythosia velutina Birket-Smith, 1965

Genus of moths

Asythosia is a genus of moths in the subfamily Arctiinae. It contains the single species Asythosia velutina, which is found in Cameroon.
