= Nudina =

Scientific classification
- Domain: Eukaryota
- Kingdom: Animalia
- Phylum: Arthropoda
- Class: Insecta
- Order: Lepidoptera
- Superfamily: Noctuoidea
- Family: Erebidae
- Subfamily: Arctiinae
- Tribe: Lithosiini
- Genus: Nudina; Staudinger, 1887
- Species: N. artaxidia

Binomial name
- Nudina artaxidia (Butler, 1881)

Synonyms
- Miltochrista artaxidia Butler, 1881; Nudaria nubilosa Staudinger, 1887

Genus of moths

Nudina is a monotypic moth genus in the subfamily Arctiinae described by Staudinger in 1887. Its single species, Nudina artaxidia, was first described by Arthur Gardiner Butler in 1881. It is found in the Russian Far East (Primorye), China (Heilongjiang, Liaonin, Shanxi, Guangxi, Yunan, Guangdong), Taiwan, Korea and Japan.
