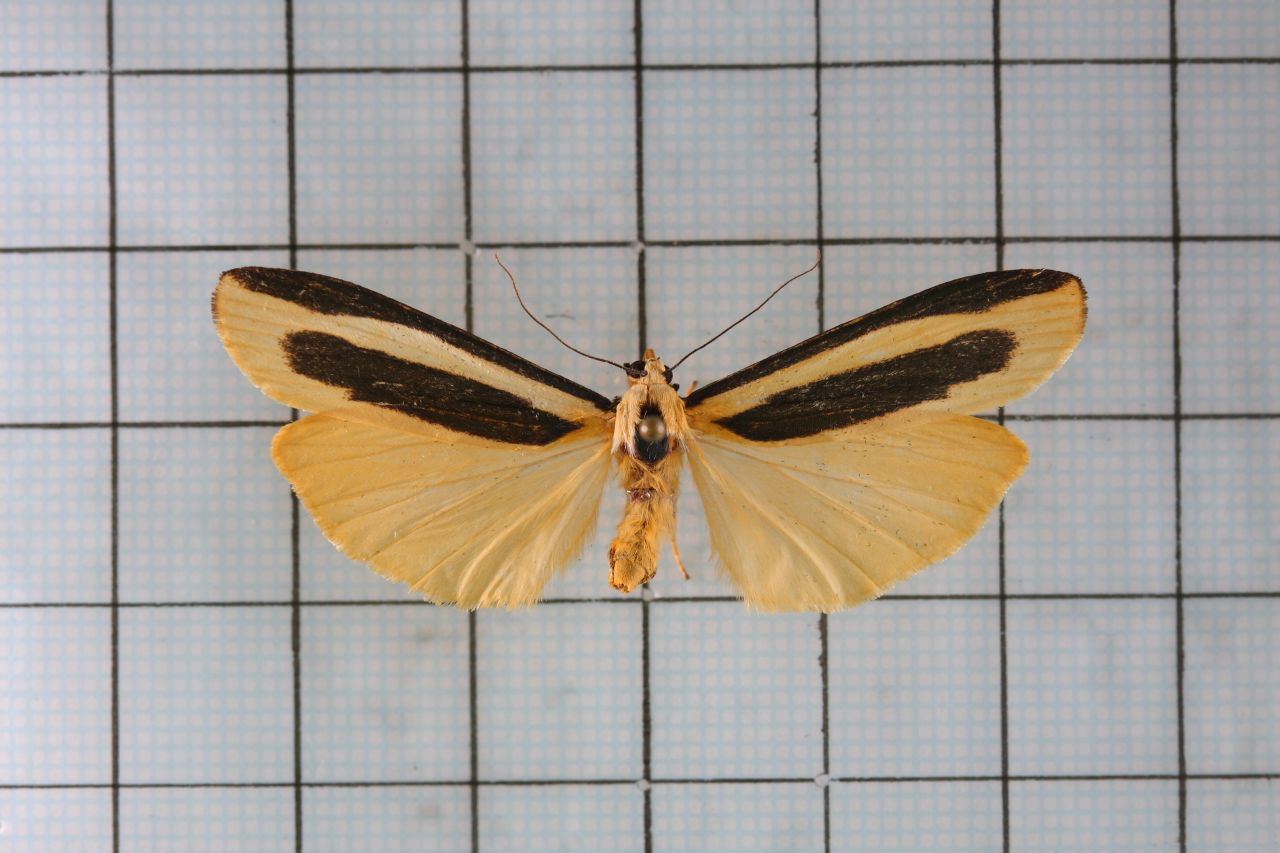

Scientific classification
- Kingdom: Animalia
- Phylum: Arthropoda
- Class: Insecta
- Order: Lepidoptera
- Superfamily: Noctuoidea
- Family: Erebidae
- Subfamily: Arctiinae
- Tribe: Lithosiini
- Genus: Heliorabdia; Hampson, 1911
- Species: H. taiwana

Binomial name
- Heliorabdia taiwana (Wileman, 1910)

Synonyms
- Chrysorabdia taiwana Wileman, 1910

= Heliorabdia =

Heliorabdia taiwana

Genus of moths

Heliorabdia is a genus of moth in the subfamily Arctiinae. It contains only one species, Heliorabdia taiwana, which is found in Taiwan.
