= Euproctosia =

Scientific classification
- Kingdom: Animalia
- Phylum: Arthropoda
- Class: Insecta
- Order: Lepidoptera
- Superfamily: Noctuoidea
- Family: Erebidae
- Subfamily: Arctiinae
- Tribe: Lithosiini
- Genus: Euproctosia; Hampson, 1914
- Species: E. cretata

Binomial name
- Euproctosia cretata Hampson, 1914

Genus of moths

Euproctosia is a genus of moths in the subfamily Arctiinae. It contains the single species Euproctosia cretata, which is found in Ghana.
