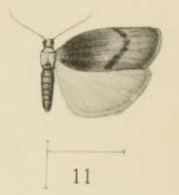

Scientific classification
- Kingdom: Animalia
- Phylum: Arthropoda
- Class: Insecta
- Order: Lepidoptera
- Superfamily: Noctuoidea
- Family: Erebidae
- Subfamily: Arctiinae
- Tribe: Lithosiini
- Genus: Lepidilema; Aurivillius, 1910
- Species: L. unipectinata

Binomial name
- Lepidilema unipectinata Aurivillius, 1910

Synonyms
- Ilema maculifascia Hampson, 1918

= Lepidilema =

Genus of moths

Lepidilema is a genus of moths in the subfamily Arctiinae. It contains the single species Lepidilema unipectinata, which is found in Kenya, Malawi and Tanzania.

== Bibliography ==
- Natural History Museum Lepidoptera generic names catalog
