= Dixanaene =

Scientific classification
- Kingdom: Animalia
- Phylum: Arthropoda
- Class: Insecta
- Order: Lepidoptera
- Superfamily: Noctuoidea
- Family: Erebidae
- Subfamily: Arctiinae
- Tribe: Lithosiini
- Genus: Dixanaene; Dyar, 1914
- Species: D. lepidocaena

Binomial name
- Dixanaene lepidocaena Dyar, 1914

Genus of moths

Dixanaene is a monotypic moth genus in the subfamily Arctiinae. Its single species, Dixanaene lepidocaena, is found in Panama. Both the genus and species were first described by Harrison Gray Dyar Jr. in 1914.
