= Meneclia =

Scientific classification
- Domain: Eukaryota
- Kingdom: Animalia
- Phylum: Arthropoda
- Class: Insecta
- Order: Lepidoptera
- Superfamily: Noctuoidea
- Family: Erebidae
- Subfamily: Arctiinae
- Tribe: Lithosiini
- Genus: Meneclia; Grünberg, 1910
- Species: M. pallidula

Binomial name
- Meneclia pallidula Grünberg, 1910

Genus of moths

Meneclia is a monotypic moth genus in the subfamily Arctiinae. Its single species, Meneclia pallidula, is found in Namibia. Both the genus and species were first described by Karl Grünberg in 1910.
