= Hypagoptera =

Scientific classification
- Kingdom: Animalia
- Phylum: Arthropoda
- Class: Insecta
- Order: Lepidoptera
- Superfamily: Noctuoidea
- Family: Erebidae
- Subfamily: Arctiinae
- Tribe: Lithosiini
- Genus: Hypagoptera; Hampson, 1900
- Species: H. rufeola

Binomial name
- Hypagoptera rufeola Hampson, 1900

Genus of moths

Hypagoptera is a genus of moths in the subfamily Arctiinae. It contains the single species Hypagoptera rufeola, which is found in South Africa.
