= Nesiotica =

Scientific classification
- Domain: Eukaryota
- Kingdom: Animalia
- Phylum: Arthropoda
- Class: Insecta
- Order: Lepidoptera
- Superfamily: Noctuoidea
- Family: Erebidae
- Subfamily: Arctiinae
- Tribe: Lithosiini
- Genus: Nesiotica; Turner, 1917
- Species: N. cladara

Binomial name
- Nesiotica cladara Turner, 1917

Genus of moths

Nesiotica is a genus of moths in the subfamily Arctiinae. It contains the single species Nesiotica cladara, which is found on Norfolk Island.
