= Vulmara =

Scientific classification
- Domain: Eukaryota
- Kingdom: Animalia
- Phylum: Arthropoda
- Class: Insecta
- Order: Lepidoptera
- Superfamily: Noctuoidea
- Family: Erebidae
- Subfamily: Arctiinae
- Tribe: Lithosiini
- Genus: Vulmara; Schaus, 1924
- Species: V. drostana

Binomial name
- Vulmara drostana Schaus, 1924

Genus of moths

Vulmara is a monotypic moth genus in the subfamily Arctiinae described by William Schaus in 1924. Its single species, Vulmara drostana, described by the same author in the same year, is found in Guatemala.
