= Prolobosia =

Scientific classification
- Kingdom: Animalia
- Phylum: Arthropoda
- Class: Insecta
- Order: Lepidoptera
- Superfamily: Noctuoidea
- Family: Erebidae
- Subfamily: Arctiinae
- Tribe: Lithosiini
- Genus: Prolobosia; Hampson, 1914
- Species: P. schistacea

Binomial name
- Prolobosia schistacea (Rothschild, 1913)

Synonyms
- Procrimima schistacea Rothschild, 1913

Genus of moths

Prolobosia is a genus of moths in the subfamily Arctiinae. It contains the single species Prolobosia schistacea, which is found in Peru.
