= Xantholopha =

Scientific classification
- Domain: Eukaryota
- Kingdom: Animalia
- Phylum: Arthropoda
- Class: Insecta
- Order: Lepidoptera
- Superfamily: Noctuoidea
- Family: Erebidae
- Subfamily: Arctiinae
- Tribe: Lithosiini
- Genus: Xantholopha; Schaus, 1899
- Species: X. purpurascens

Binomial name
- Xantholopha purpurascens Schaus, 1899

Genus of moths

Xantholopha is a monotypic moth genus in the subfamily Arctiinae. Its single species, Xantholopha purpurascens, is found in Paraná, Brazil. Both the genus and species were first described by William Schaus in 1899.
