= Parabitecta =

Scientific classification
- Domain: Eukaryota
- Kingdom: Animalia
- Phylum: Arthropoda
- Class: Insecta
- Order: Lepidoptera
- Superfamily: Noctuoidea
- Family: Erebidae
- Subfamily: Arctiinae
- Tribe: Lithosiini
- Genus: Parabitecta; Hering, 1926
- Species: P. flava

Binomial name
- Parabitecta flava Hering, 1926

Genus of moths

Parabitecta is a genus of moths in the subfamily Arctiinae. It contains the single species Parabitecta flava, which is found in China.
