= Aethosia =

Scientific classification
- Domain: Eukaryota
- Kingdom: Animalia
- Phylum: Arthropoda
- Class: Insecta
- Order: Lepidoptera
- Superfamily: Noctuoidea
- Family: Erebidae
- Subfamily: Arctiinae
- Tribe: Lithosiini
- Genus: Aethosia; Hampson, 1900
- Species: A. ectrocta

Binomial name
- Aethosia ectrocta Hampson, 1900

Single-species genus of moths

Aethosia is a monotypic moth genus in the subfamily Arctiinae. Its only species, Aethosia ectrocta, is found in Haiti. Both the genus and species were first described by George Hampson in 1900.
