= Pseudomacroptila =

Scientific classification
- Domain: Eukaryota
- Kingdom: Animalia
- Phylum: Arthropoda
- Class: Insecta
- Order: Lepidoptera
- Superfamily: Noctuoidea
- Family: Erebidae
- Subfamily: Arctiinae
- Tribe: Lithosiini
- Genus: Pseudomacroptila; Fleming, 1951
- Species: P. argentea

Binomial name
- Pseudomacroptila argentea Fleming, 1951

Genus of moths

Pseudomacroptila is a genus of moths in the subfamily Arctiinae. It contains the single species Pseudomacroptila argentea, which is found in Venezuela.
