= Darantasiella =

Scientific classification
- Kingdom: Animalia
- Phylum: Arthropoda
- Class: Insecta
- Order: Lepidoptera
- Superfamily: Noctuoidea
- Family: Erebidae
- Subfamily: Arctiinae
- Tribe: Lithosiini
- Genus: Darantasiella; Roepke, 1943
- Species: D. javanica

Binomial name
- Darantasiella javanica Roepke, 1943

Genus of moths

Darantasiella is a genus of moths in the subfamily Arctiinae. It contains the single species Darantasiella javanica, which is found on Java.
