= Siopastea =

Scientific classification
- Domain: Eukaryota
- Kingdom: Animalia
- Phylum: Arthropoda
- Class: Insecta
- Order: Lepidoptera
- Superfamily: Noctuoidea
- Family: Erebidae
- Subfamily: Arctiinae
- Tribe: Lithosiini
- Genus: Siopastea; Schaus, 1922
- Species: S. bakeri

Binomial name
- Siopastea bakeri Schaus, 1922

Genus of insects

Siopastea is a genus of moths in the subfamily Arctiinae. It contains the single species Siopastea bakeri, which is found in the Philippines.
