= Hestiarcha =

Scientific classification
- Kingdom: Animalia
- Phylum: Arthropoda
- Class: Insecta
- Order: Lepidoptera
- Superfamily: Noctuoidea
- Family: Erebidae
- Subfamily: Arctiinae
- Tribe: Lithosiini
- Genus: Hestiarcha; Meyrick, 1886
- Species: H. pyrrhopa

Binomial name
- Hestiarcha pyrrhopa Meyrick, 1886

Genus of moths

Hestiarcha is a monotypic moth genus in the subfamily Arctiinae. Its single species, Hestiarcha pyrrhopa, is found in Australia, where it has been recorded from South Australia. The genus and species were first described by Edward Meyrick in 1886.
