= Lacydoides =

Scientific classification
- Domain: Eukaryota
- Kingdom: Animalia
- Phylum: Arthropoda
- Class: Insecta
- Order: Lepidoptera
- Superfamily: Noctuoidea
- Family: Erebidae
- Subfamily: Arctiinae
- Tribe: Lithosiini
- Genus: Lacydoides; Daniel, 1955
- Species: L. tibetensis

Binomial name
- Lacydoides tibetensis Daniel, 1955

Genus of moths

Lacydoides is a genus of moths in the subfamily Arctiinae. It contains the single species Lacydoides tibetensis, which is found in Tibet.
