= Pachasura =

Scientific classification
- Domain: Eukaryota
- Kingdom: Animalia
- Phylum: Arthropoda
- Class: Insecta
- Order: Lepidoptera
- Superfamily: Noctuoidea
- Family: Erebidae
- Subfamily: Arctiinae
- Tribe: Lithosiini
- Genus: Pachasura; Dognin, 1923
- Species: P. stellata

Binomial name
- Pachasura stellata Dognin, 1923

Genus of moths

Pachasura is a genus of moths in the subfamily Arctiinae. It contains the single species Pachasura stellata, which is found in Colombia.
