= Parashada =

Scientific classification
- Kingdom: Animalia
- Phylum: Arthropoda
- Class: Insecta
- Order: Lepidoptera
- Superfamily: Noctuoidea
- Family: Erebidae
- Subfamily: Arctiinae
- Tribe: Lithosiini
- Genus: Parashada; Hampson, 1905
- Species: P. truncata

Binomial name
- Parashada truncata Hampson, 1905

Genus of moths

Parashada is a genus of moths in the subfamily Arctiinae. It contains the single species Parashada truncata, which is found on the Sula Islands.
