= Plumareola =

Scientific classification
- Domain: Eukaryota
- Kingdom: Animalia
- Phylum: Arthropoda
- Class: Insecta
- Order: Lepidoptera
- Superfamily: Noctuoidea
- Family: Erebidae
- Subfamily: Arctiinae
- Tribe: Lithosiini
- Genus: Plumareola van Eecke, 1920
- Species: P. lineola

Binomial name
- Plumareola lineola van Eecke, 1920

Genus of moths

Plumareola is a genus of moths in the subfamily Arctiinae. It contains the single species Plumareola lineola, which is found on Java.
