= Arhabdosia =

Scientific classification
- Kingdom: Animalia
- Phylum: Arthropoda
- Class: Insecta
- Order: Lepidoptera
- Superfamily: Noctuoidea
- Family: Erebidae
- Subfamily: Arctiinae
- Tribe: Lithosiini
- Genus: Arhabdosia; Dyar, 1905
- Species: A. subvarda

Binomial name
- Arhabdosia subvarda Schaus, 1905

Genus of moths

Arhabdosia is a genus of moths in the subfamily Arctiinae. It contains the single species Arhabdosia subvarda, which is found in French Guiana.
