= Glaucosia =

Scientific classification
- Kingdom: Animalia
- Phylum: Arthropoda
- Class: Insecta
- Order: Lepidoptera
- Superfamily: Noctuoidea
- Family: Erebidae
- Subfamily: Arctiinae
- Tribe: Lithosiini
- Genus: Glaucosia; Hampson, 1900
- Species: G. argyllia

Binomial name
- Glaucosia argyllia Hampson, 1900

Genus of moths

Glaucosia is a monotypic moth genus in the subfamily Arctiinae. Its only species, Glaucosia argyllia, is found in Espírito Santo, Brazil. Both the genus and species were first described by George Hampson in 1900.
