= Parvicincia =

Scientific classification
- Domain: Eukaryota
- Kingdom: Animalia
- Phylum: Arthropoda
- Class: Insecta
- Order: Lepidoptera
- Superfamily: Noctuoidea
- Family: Erebidae
- Subfamily: Arctiinae
- Tribe: Lithosiini
- Genus: Parvicincia; Field, 1950
- Species: P. belli

Binomial name
- Parvicincia belli Field, 1950

Genus of moths

Parvicincia is a genus of moths in the subfamily Arctiinae. It contains the single species Parvicincia belli, which is found on Jamaica.
