= Hypasura =

Scientific classification
- Domain: Eukaryota
- Kingdom: Animalia
- Phylum: Arthropoda
- Class: Insecta
- Order: Lepidoptera
- Superfamily: Noctuoidea
- Family: Erebidae
- Subfamily: Arctiinae
- Tribe: Lithosiini
- Genus: Hypasura; Daniel, 1952
- Species: H. hoenei

Binomial name
- Hypasura hoenei Daniel, 1952

Synonyms
- Hypasura hönei

Genus of moths

Hypasura is a monotypic moth genus in the subfamily Arctiinae. Its single species, Hypasura hoenei, is found in Hunan, China. Both the genus and species were first described by Franz Daniel in 1952.
