= Trissobrocha =

Scientific classification
- Domain: Eukaryota
- Kingdom: Animalia
- Phylum: Arthropoda
- Class: Insecta
- Order: Lepidoptera
- Superfamily: Noctuoidea
- Family: Erebidae
- Subfamily: Arctiinae
- Tribe: Lithosiini
- Genus: Trissobrocha; Turner, 1914
- Species: T. eugraphica

Binomial name
- Trissobrocha eugraphica Turner, 1914

Genus of moths

Trissobrocha is a monotypic moth genus in the subfamily Arctiinae. Its single species, Trissobrocha eugraphica, is found in Australia, where it has been recorded from New South Wales and Queensland. Both the genus and species were first described by Turner in 1914.
