= Zadadrina =

Scientific classification
- Domain: Eukaryota
- Kingdom: Animalia
- Phylum: Arthropoda
- Class: Insecta
- Order: Lepidoptera
- Superfamily: Noctuoidea
- Family: Erebidae
- Subfamily: Arctiinae
- Tribe: Lithosiini
- Genus: Zadadrina; Kiriakoff, 1954
- Species: Z. metallica

Binomial name
- Zadadrina metallica Kiriakoff, 1954

Genus of moths

Zadadrina is a genus of moths in the subfamily Arctiinae. It contains the single species Zadadrina metallica, which is found in the Democratic Republic of the Congo and South Africa.
