= Palaeozana =

Scientific classification
- Kingdom: Animalia
- Phylum: Arthropoda
- Class: Insecta
- Order: Lepidoptera
- Superfamily: Noctuoidea
- Family: Erebidae
- Subfamily: Arctiinae
- Tribe: Lithosiini
- Genus: Palaeozana; Dyar, 1914
- Species: P. mida

Binomial name
- Palaeozana mida Dyar, 1914

Genus of moths

Palaeozana is a monotypic moth genus in the subfamily Arctiinae. Its single species, Palaeozana mida, is found in Panama. Both the genus and species were first described by Harrison Gray Dyar Jr. in 1914.
