= Ardonissa =

Scientific classification
- Domain: Eukaryota
- Kingdom: Animalia
- Phylum: Arthropoda
- Class: Insecta
- Order: Lepidoptera
- Superfamily: Noctuoidea
- Family: Erebidae
- Subfamily: Arctiinae
- Tribe: Lithosiini
- Genus: Ardonissa; Dognin, 1907
- Species: A. adscitina

Binomial name
- Ardonissa adscitina Dognin, 1907

Genus of moths

Ardonissa is a genus of moths in the subfamily Arctiinae. It was described by Paul Dognin in 1907, and its single species is Ardonissa adscitina, which is found in Peru.
