= Thermeola =

Scientific classification
- Kingdom: Animalia
- Phylum: Arthropoda
- Class: Insecta
- Order: Lepidoptera
- Superfamily: Noctuoidea
- Family: Erebidae
- Subfamily: Arctiinae
- Tribe: Lithosiini
- Genus: Thermeola; Hampson, 1900
- Species: T. tasmanica

Binomial name
- Thermeola tasmanica Hampson, 1900

Synonyms
- Hestiarcha atala Turner, 1922

Genus of moths

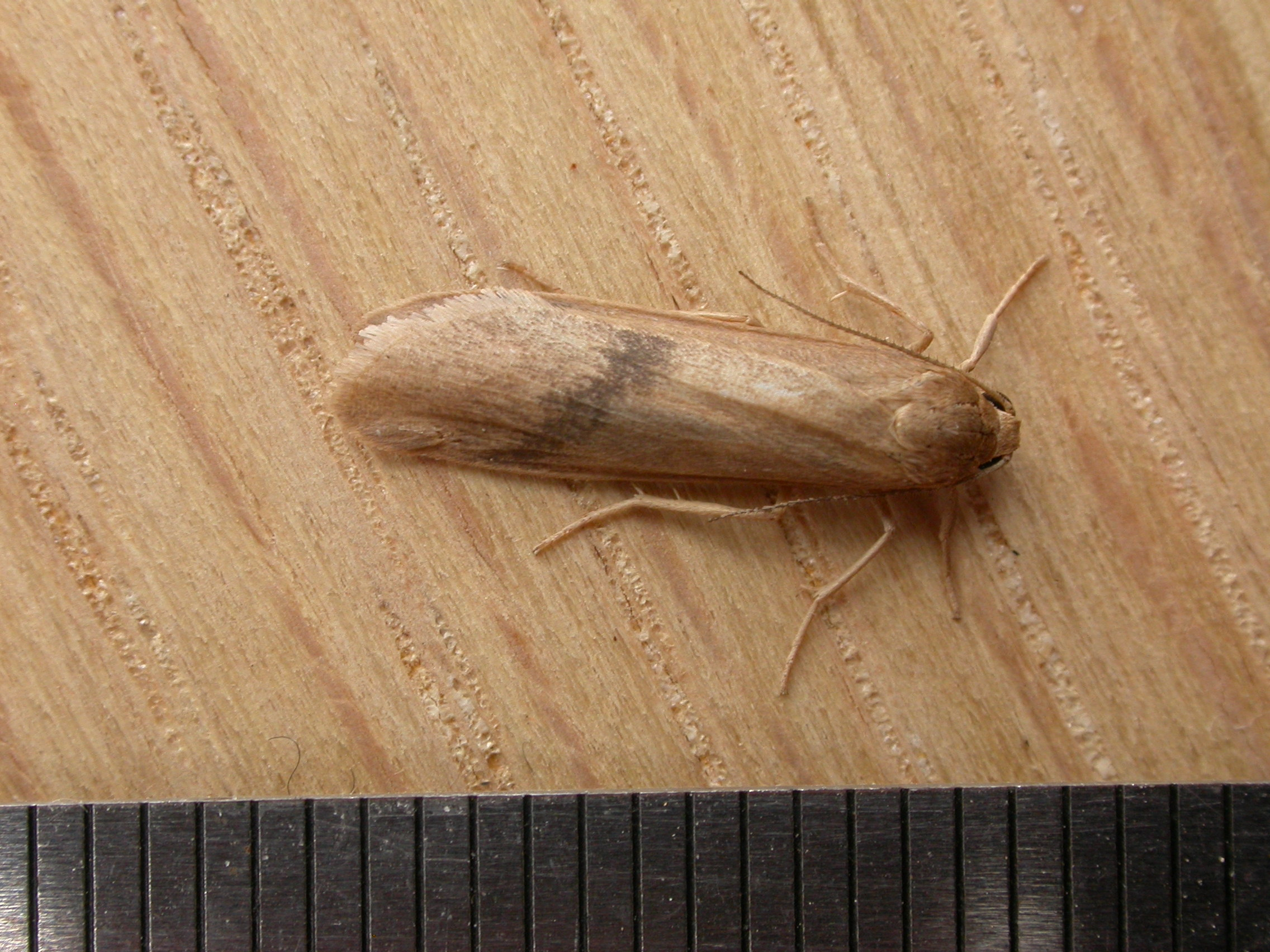
A Thermeola

Thermeola is a monotypic moth genus in the subfamily Arctiinae. Its only species, Thermeola tasmanica, is found in the Australian state of Tasmania. The genus and species were described by George Hampson in 1900.
