= Onymapata =

Scientific classification
- Domain: Eukaryota
- Kingdom: Animalia
- Phylum: Arthropoda
- Class: Insecta
- Order: Lepidoptera
- Superfamily: Noctuoidea
- Family: Erebidae
- Subfamily: Arctiinae
- Tribe: Lithosiini
- Genus: Onymapata; Hulstaert, 1924
- Species: O. vittata

Binomial name
- Onymapata vittata (Hulstaert, 1923)

Synonyms
- Stenocyttara Hulstaert, 1923 (preocc. Turner, 1918); Stenocyttara vittata Hulstaert, 1923

Genus of moths

Onymapata is a monotypic moth genus in the subfamily Arctiinae. Its single species, Onymapata vittata, is found in the Philippines. Gustaaf Hulstaert erected the genus in 1924 and described the species in 1923.
