= Eugonosia =

Scientific classification
- Domain: Eukaryota
- Kingdom: Animalia
- Phylum: Arthropoda
- Class: Insecta
- Order: Lepidoptera
- Superfamily: Noctuoidea
- Family: Erebidae
- Subfamily: Arctiinae
- Tribe: Lithosiini
- Genus: Eugonosia; Schaus, 1899
- Species: E. angulifer

Binomial name
- Eugonosia angulifer Schaus, 1899

Genus of moths

Eugonosia is a monotypic moth genus in the subfamily Arctiinae. Its single species, Eugonosia angulifer, is found in the Brazilian state of Paraná. Both the genus and species were first described by William Schaus in 1899.
