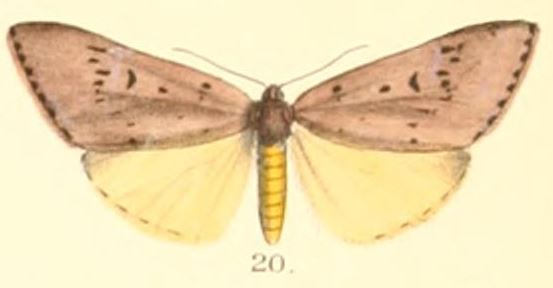

Scientific classification
- Domain: Eukaryota
- Kingdom: Animalia
- Phylum: Arthropoda
- Class: Insecta
- Order: Lepidoptera
- Superfamily: Noctuoidea
- Family: Erebidae
- Subfamily: Arctiinae
- Genus: Adrepsa; Moore, 1879
- Species: A. stilbioides

Binomial name
- Adrepsa stilbioides Moore, 1879

= Adrepsa =

Genus of moths

Adrepsa is a genus of moths in the subfamily Arctiinae first described by Frederic Moore in 1879.

There is only one species in this genus, Adrepsa stilbioides Moore, 1879 that is found in India.
