= Lysceia =

Scientific classification
- Kingdom: Animalia
- Phylum: Arthropoda
- Class: Insecta
- Order: Lepidoptera
- Superfamily: Noctuoidea
- Family: Erebidae
- Subfamily: Arctiinae
- Tribe: Lithosiini
- Genus: Lysceia; Walker, 1854
- Species: L. bigutta

Binomial name
- Lysceia bigutta Walker, 1854

Genus of moths

Lysceia is a monotypic moth genus in the subfamily Arctiinae described by Francis Walker in 1854. It contains a single species, Lysceia bigutta, described by the same author in the same book, which is found in South Africa.
