= Physetocneme =

Scientific classification
- Domain: Eukaryota
- Kingdom: Animalia
- Phylum: Arthropoda
- Class: Insecta
- Order: Lepidoptera
- Superfamily: Noctuoidea
- Family: Erebidae
- Subfamily: Arctiinae
- Tribe: Lithosiini
- Genus: Physetocneme; Felder, 1861
- Species: P. ciliosa

Binomial name
- Physetocneme ciliosa Felder, 1861

Genus of moths

Physetocneme is a genus of moths in the subfamily Arctiinae. It contains the single species Physetocneme ciliosa, which is found on Ambon Island.
