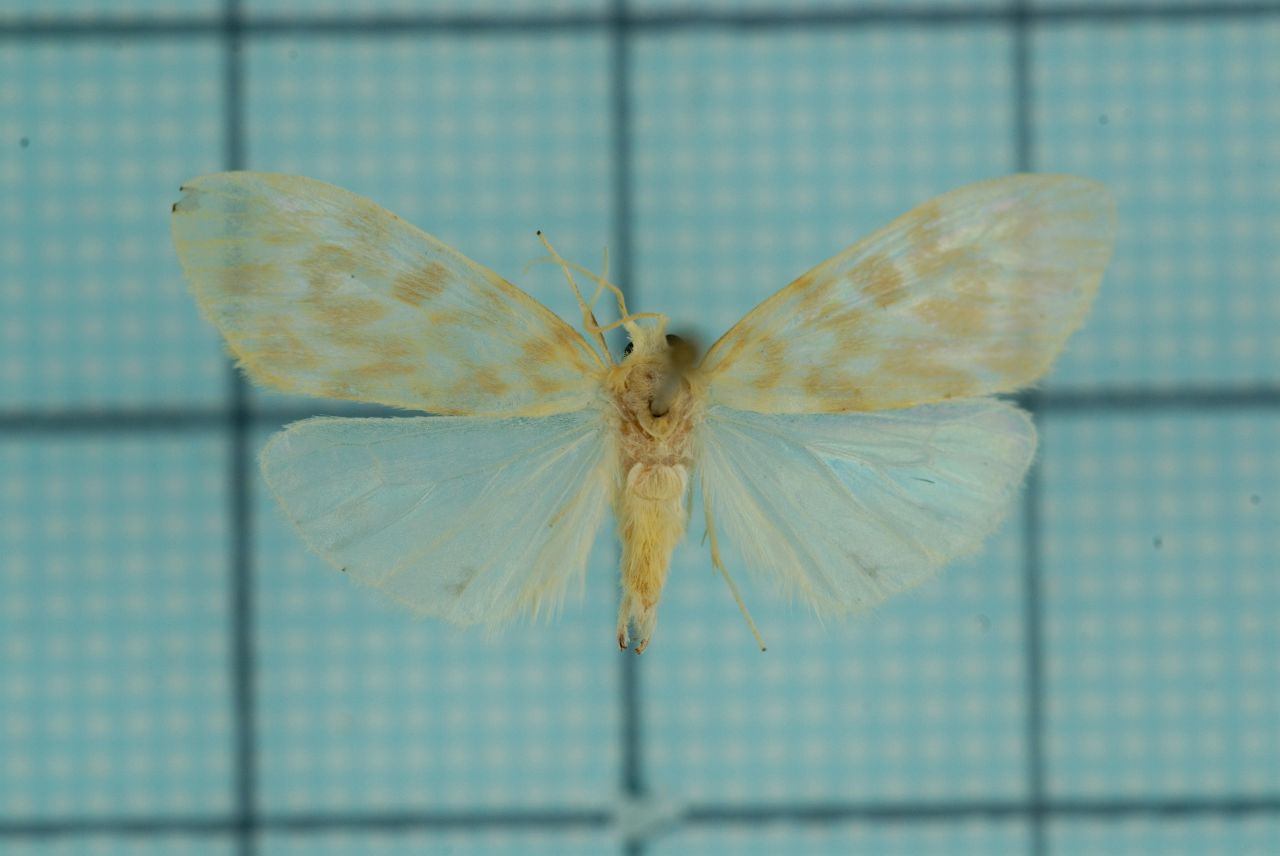

Scientific classification
- Kingdom: Animalia
- Phylum: Arthropoda
- Class: Insecta
- Order: Lepidoptera
- Superfamily: Noctuoidea
- Family: Erebidae
- Subfamily: Arctiinae
- Tribe: Lithosiini
- Genus: Hemipsilia; Hampson, 1900
- Species: H. coavestis

Binomial name
- Hemipsilia coavestis (Hampson, 1894)

Synonyms
- Nudaria coavestis Hampson, 1894

= Hemipsilia =

Hemipsilia coavestis

Genus of moths

Hemipsilia is a genus of moth in the subfamily Arctiinae. It consists of only one species, Hemipsilia coavestis, which is found from India to Taiwan.
