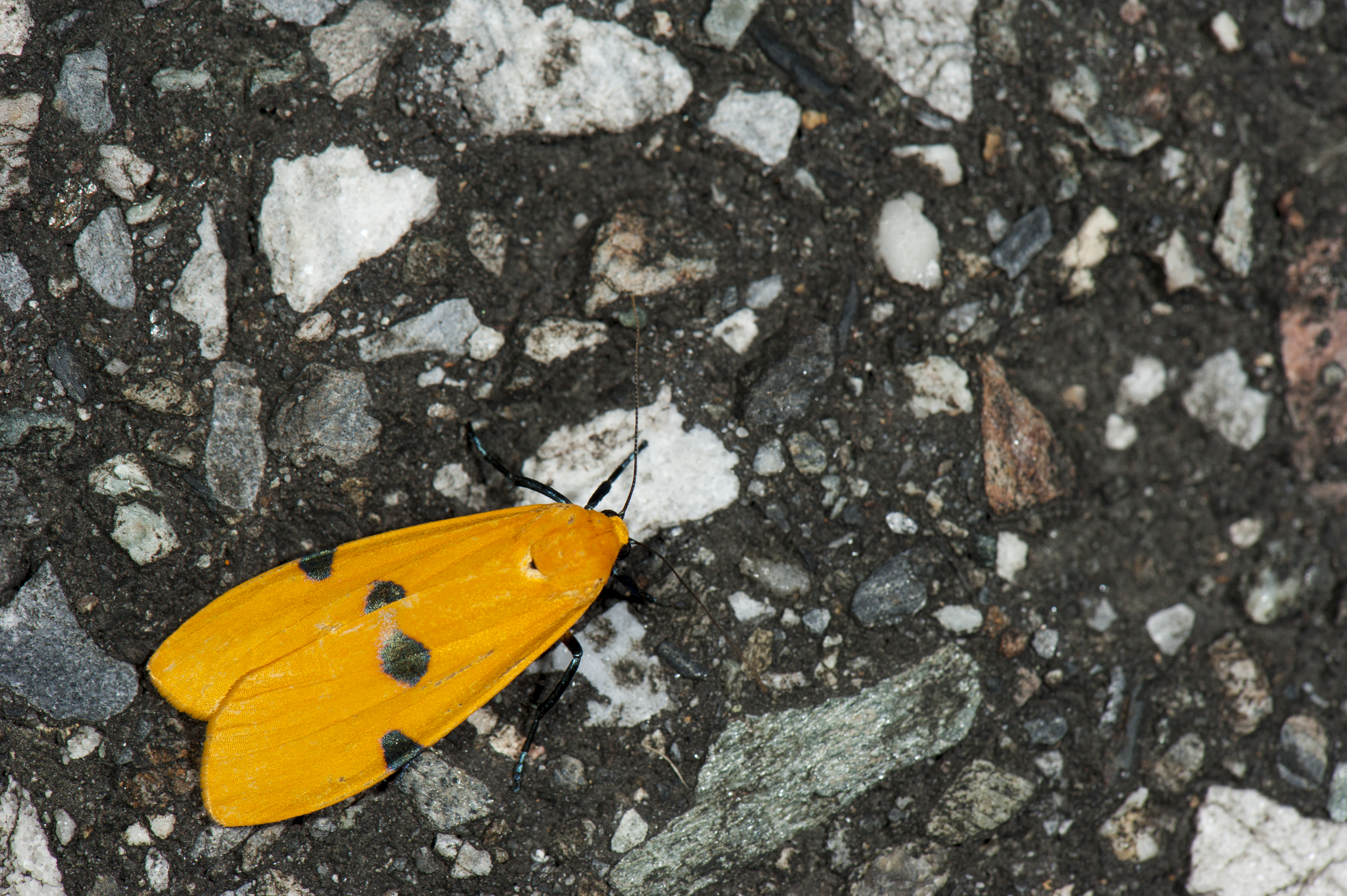
- Conilepia nigricosta

Scientific classification
- Kingdom: Animalia
- Phylum: Arthropoda
- Class: Insecta
- Order: Lepidoptera
- Superfamily: Noctuoidea
- Family: Erebidae
- Subfamily: Arctiinae
- Tribe: Lithosiini
- Genus: Conilepia; Hampson, 1900
- Species: C. nigricosta

Binomial name
- Conilepia nigricosta (Leech, 1888)

Synonyms
- Oeonistis nigricosta Leech, 1888

= Conilepia =

Genus of moths

Conilepia is a monotypic moth genus in the subfamily Arctiinae erected by George Hampson in 1900. Its only species, Conilepia nigricosta, was first described by John Henry Leech in 1888. It is found in Japan and Taiwan.
