= Atelophleps =

Scientific classification
- Domain: Eukaryota
- Kingdom: Animalia
- Phylum: Arthropoda
- Class: Insecta
- Order: Lepidoptera
- Superfamily: Noctuoidea
- Family: Erebidae
- Subfamily: Arctiinae
- Tribe: Lithosiini
- Genus: Atelophleps; Turner, 1940
- Species: A. tridesma

Binomial name
- Atelophleps tridesma Turner, 1940

Genus of moths

Atelophleps is a monotypic moth genus in the subfamily Arctiinae. Its single species, Atelophleps tridesma, is found in Australia. Both the genus and the species were first described by Turner in 1940.
