= Deua =

Scientific classification
- Kingdom: Animalia
- Phylum: Arthropoda
- Class: Insecta
- Order: Lepidoptera
- Superfamily: Noctuoidea
- Family: Erebidae
- Subfamily: Arctiinae
- Tribe: Lithosiini
- Genus: Deua; Walker, 1864
- Species: D. imbutana

Binomial name
- Deua imbutana Walker, 1864

Genus of moths

Deua is a genus of moths in the subfamily Arctiinae. It contains the single species Deua imbutana, which is found on Haiti.
