= Parelictis =

Scientific classification
- Kingdom: Animalia
- Phylum: Arthropoda
- Class: Insecta
- Order: Lepidoptera
- Superfamily: Noctuoidea
- Family: Erebidae
- Subfamily: Arctiinae
- Tribe: Lithosiini
- Genus: Parelictis; Meyrick, 1886
- Species: P. saleuta

Binomial name
- Parelictis saleuta Meyrick, 1886

Genus of moths

Parelictis is a monotypic moth genus in the subfamily Arctiinae. Its only species, Parelictis saleuta, the mottled footman, has been recorded from the Australian states of New South Wales and Victoria. Both the genus and species were first described by Edward Meyrick in 1886.

The wingspan is about 35 mm. The forewings are grey with slight patterning. The hindwings are pale yellow. Females have dark hindwing apices.
