= Nudosia =

Scientific classification
- Kingdom: Animalia
- Phylum: Arthropoda
- Class: Insecta
- Order: Lepidoptera
- Superfamily: Noctuoidea
- Family: Erebidae
- Subfamily: Arctiinae
- Tribe: Lithosiini
- Genus: Nudosia; Hampson, 1900
- Species: N. fuscifusa

Binomial name
- Nudosia fuscifusa Hampson, 1900

Genus of moths

Nudosia is a monotypic moth genus in the subfamily Arctiinae. Its single species, Nudosia fuscifusca, is found in Peru. Both the genus and species were first described by George Hampson in 1900.
