= Mahensia =

Scientific classification
- Domain: Eukaryota
- Kingdom: Animalia
- Phylum: Arthropoda
- Class: Insecta
- Order: Lepidoptera
- Superfamily: Noctuoidea
- Family: Erebidae
- Subfamily: Arctiinae
- Tribe: Lithosiini
- Genus: Mahensia; Freyer, 1912
- Species: M. seychellarum

Binomial name
- Mahensia seychellarum Freyer, 1912

Genus of moths

Mahensia is a genus of moths in the subfamily Arctiinae. It contains the single species Mahensia seychellarum, which is found on the Seychelles.
