= Meterythrosia =

Scientific classification
- Kingdom: Animalia
- Phylum: Arthropoda
- Class: Insecta
- Order: Lepidoptera
- Superfamily: Noctuoidea
- Family: Erebidae
- Subfamily: Arctiinae
- Tribe: Lithosiini
- Genus: Meterythrosia; Hampson, 1900
- Species: M. sangala

Binomial name
- Meterythrosia sangala (H. Druce, 1885)

Synonyms
- Tuina sangala H. Druce, 1885

Genus of moths

Meterythrosia is a monotypic moth genus in the subfamily Arctiinae erected by George Hampson in 1900. Its single species, Meterythrosia sangala, was first described by Herbert Druce in 1885. It is found in Guatemala.
