= Parascolia =

Scientific classification
- Kingdom: Animalia
- Phylum: Arthropoda
- Class: Insecta
- Order: Lepidoptera
- Superfamily: Noctuoidea
- Family: Erebidae
- Subfamily: Arctiinae
- Tribe: Lithosiini
- Genus: Parascolia; Watson, 1980
- Species: P. tenebrifera

Binomial name
- Parascolia tenebrifera (Hampson, 1914)

Synonyms
- Pseudoscolia Hampson, 1914 (preocc.); Pseudoscolia tenebrifera Hampson, 1914

Genus of moths

Parascolia is a genus of moths in the subfamily Arctiinae. It contains the single species Parascolia tenebrifera, which is found in New Guinea.
