= Stenaulis =

Scientific classification
- Kingdom: Animalia
- Phylum: Arthropoda
- Class: Insecta
- Order: Lepidoptera
- Superfamily: Noctuoidea
- Family: Erebidae
- Subfamily: Arctiinae
- Tribe: Lithosiini
- Genus: Stenaulis; Hampson, 1900
- Species: S. discalis

Binomial name
- Stenaulis discalis (Walker, 1862)

Synonyms
- Lithosia discalis Walker, 1862

Genus of moths

Stenaulis is a monotypic moth genus in the subfamily Arctiinae erected by George Hampson in 1900. Its single species, Stenaulis discalis, was first described by Francis Walker in 1862. It is found on Borneo. The habitat consists of lowland areas, including coastal secondary forests.
