= Anaemosia =

Scientific classification
- Kingdom: Animalia
- Phylum: Arthropoda
- Class: Insecta
- Order: Lepidoptera
- Superfamily: Noctuoidea
- Family: Erebidae
- Subfamily: Arctiinae
- Tribe: Lithosiini
- Genus: Anaemosia; Hampson, 1918
- Species: A. albida

Binomial name
- Anaemosia albida Hampson, 1918

Genus of moths

Anaemosia is a genus of moths in the subfamily Arctiinae. It contains the single species Anaemosia albida, which is found in Malawi.
