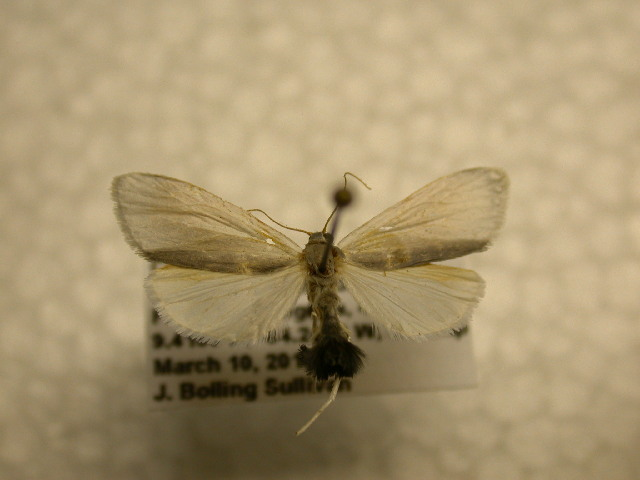

Scientific classification
- Kingdom: Animalia
- Phylum: Arthropoda
- Class: Insecta
- Order: Lepidoptera
- Superfamily: Noctuoidea
- Family: Erebidae
- Subfamily: Arctiinae
- Tribe: Lithosiini
- Genus: Hyperthagylla; Hampson, 1900
- Species: H. mira

Binomial name
- Hyperthagylla mira (Butler, 1878)

Synonyms
- Agylla mira Butler, 1878

= Hyperthagylla =

Genus of moths

Hyperthagylla is a monotypic moth genus in the subfamily Arctiinae erected by George Hampson in 1900. Its single species, Hyperthagylla mira, was first described by Arthur Gardiner Butler in 1878. It is found in the Amazon region and Costa Rica.
