= Nyctochroa =

Scientific classification
- Domain: Eukaryota
- Kingdom: Animalia
- Phylum: Arthropoda
- Class: Insecta
- Order: Lepidoptera
- Superfamily: Noctuoidea
- Family: Erebidae
- Subfamily: Arctiinae
- Tribe: Lithosiini
- Genus: Nyctochroa; Felder, 1874
- Species: N. basiplaga

Binomial name
- Nyctochroa basiplaga Felder, 1874

Synonyms
- Cyanarctia basiplaga; Hypomolis lithosiaphila Dyar, 1910

Genus of moths

Nyctochroa is a monotypic moth genus in the subfamily Arctiinae. Its single species, Nyctochroa basiplaga, is found in Mexico. Both the genus and species were first described by Felder in 1874.
