= Birgorima =

Scientific classification
- Kingdom: Animalia
- Phylum: Arthropoda
- Class: Insecta
- Order: Lepidoptera
- Superfamily: Noctuoidea
- Family: Erebidae
- Subfamily: Arctiinae
- Tribe: Lithosiini
- Genus: Birgorima; Watson, 1980
- Species: B. pulchripicta

Binomial name
- Birgorima pulchripicta (Walker, 1864)

Synonyms
- Mirobriga Walker, 1863; Mirobriga pulchripicta Walker, 1864

Genus of moths

Birgorima is a genus of moths in the subfamily Arctiinae. It contains the single species Birgorima pulchripicta, which is found in Sarawak.
