= Syntomimorpha =

Scientific classification
- Kingdom: Animalia
- Phylum: Arthropoda
- Class: Insecta
- Order: Lepidoptera
- Superfamily: Noctuoidea
- Family: Erebidae
- Subfamily: Arctiinae
- Tribe: Lithosiini
- Genus: Syntomimorpha; Hampson, 1900
- Species: S. caerulescens

Binomial name
- Syntomimorpha caerulescens Hampson, 1900

Genus of moths

Syntomimorpha is a monotypic moth genus in the subfamily Arctiinae. Its single species, Syntomimorpha caerulescens, is found on Sulawesi in Indonesia. Both the genus and species were first described by George Hampson in 1900.
