= Micrommia =

Scientific classification
- Domain: Eukaryota
- Kingdom: Animalia
- Phylum: Arthropoda
- Class: Insecta
- Order: Lepidoptera
- Superfamily: Noctuoidea
- Family: Erebidae
- Subfamily: Arctiinae
- Tribe: Lithosiini
- Genus: Micrommia; Felder, 1874
- Species: M. jugifera

Binomial name
- Micrommia jugifera Felder, 1874

Genus of moths

Micrommia is a genus of moths in the subfamily Arctiinae. It contains the single species Micrommia jugifera, which is found in the Amazon region.
