= Nilgiricola =

Scientific classification
- Kingdom: Animalia
- Phylum: Arthropoda
- Class: Insecta
- Order: Lepidoptera
- Superfamily: Noctuoidea
- Family: Erebidae
- Subfamily: Arctiinae
- Tribe: Lithosiini
- Genus: Nilgiricola; Hampson, 1918
- Species: N. sicciana

Binomial name
- Nilgiricola sicciana Hampson, 1918

Genus of moths

Nilgiricola is a genus of moths in the subfamily Arctiinae. It contains the single species Nilgiricola sicciana, which is found in India (Madras).
