= Stenopterosia =

Scientific classification
- Domain: Eukaryota
- Kingdom: Animalia
- Phylum: Arthropoda
- Class: Insecta
- Order: Lepidoptera
- Superfamily: Noctuoidea
- Family: Erebidae
- Subfamily: Arctiinae
- Tribe: Lithosiini
- Genus: Stenopterosia de Joannis, 1928
- Species: S. angustipennis

Binomial name
- Stenopterosia angustipennis de Joannis, 1928

Genus of moths

Stenopterosia is a genus of moths in the subfamily Arctiinae. It contains the single species Stenopterosia angustipennis, which is found in Vietnam.
