= Anaphleps =

Scientific classification
- Domain: Eukaryota
- Kingdom: Animalia
- Phylum: Arthropoda
- Class: Insecta
- Order: Lepidoptera
- Superfamily: Noctuoidea
- Family: Erebidae
- Subfamily: Arctiinae
- Tribe: Lithosiini
- Genus: Anaphleps; Rothschild, 1916
- Species: A. angustipennis

Binomial name
- Anaphleps angustipennis Rothschild, 1916

Genus of moths

Anaphleps is a monotypic moth genus in the subfamily Arctiinae described by Rothschild in 1916. It contains the single species Anaphleps angustipennis, which is found on Vulcan Island, Papua New Guinea.
