= Hassleria =

Scientific classification
- Domain: Eukaryota
- Kingdom: Animalia
- Phylum: Arthropoda
- Class: Insecta
- Order: Lepidoptera
- Superfamily: Noctuoidea
- Family: Erebidae
- Subfamily: Arctiinae
- Tribe: Lithosiini
- Genus: Hassleria; Jörgensen, 1934
- Species: H. majas

Binomial name
- Hassleria majas Jörgensen, 1934

Genus of moths

Hassleria is a genus of moths in the subfamily Arctiinae. It contains the single species Hassleria majas, which is found in Paraguay.
