= Chrysozana =

Scientific classification
- Kingdom: Animalia
- Phylum: Arthropoda
- Class: Insecta
- Order: Lepidoptera
- Superfamily: Noctuoidea
- Family: Erebidae
- Subfamily: Arctiinae
- Tribe: Lithosiini
- Genus: Chrysozana; Hampson, 1900
- Species: C. croesus

Binomial name
- Chrysozana croesus Hampson, 1900

Genus of moths

Chrysozana is a monotypic moth genus in the subfamily Arctiinae. Its single species, Chrysozana croesus, is found in Bolivia. Both the genus and species were first described by George Hampson in 1900.
