= Hypeugoa =

Scientific classification
- Domain: Eukaryota
- Kingdom: Animalia
- Phylum: Arthropoda
- Class: Insecta
- Order: Lepidoptera
- Superfamily: Noctuoidea
- Family: Erebidae
- Subfamily: Arctiinae
- Tribe: Lithosiini
- Genus: Hypeugoa; Leech, 1899
- Species: H. flavogrisea

Binomial name
- Hypeugoa flavogrisea Leech, 1899

Genus of moths

Hypeugoa is a monotypic moth genus in the subfamily Arctiinae. Its single species, Hypeugoa flavogrisea, is found in western China. Both the genus and species were first described by John Henry Leech in 1899.
