= Oreopola =

Scientific classification
- Domain: Eukaryota
- Kingdom: Animalia
- Phylum: Arthropoda
- Class: Insecta
- Order: Lepidoptera
- Superfamily: Noctuoidea
- Family: Erebidae
- Subfamily: Arctiinae
- Tribe: Lithosiini
- Genus: Oreopola; Turner, 1940
- Species: O. athola

Binomial name
- Oreopola athola Turner, 1940

Genus of moths

Oreopola is a monotypic moth genus in the subfamily Arctiinae. Its single species, Oreopola athola, is found in Australian island state ofTasmania. Both the genus and species were first described by Turner in 1940.
