= Phaeophlebosia =

Scientific classification
- Kingdom: Animalia
- Phylum: Arthropoda
- Class: Insecta
- Order: Lepidoptera
- Superfamily: Noctuoidea
- Family: Erebidae
- Subfamily: Arctiinae
- Tribe: Lithosiini
- Genus: Phaeophlebosia; Hampson, 1900
- Species: P. furcifera

Binomial name
- Phaeophlebosia furcifera (Walker, 1854)

Synonyms
- Setina furcifera Walker, 1854; Setina trifurcata Walker, [1865]

Genus of moths

Phaeophlebosia is a monotypic moth genus in the subfamily Arctiinae erected by George Hampson in 1900. Its single species, Phaeophlebosia furcifera, the forked footman, was first described by Francis Walker in 1854. It is found in Australia, where it has been recorded from New South Wales, Victoria, Tasmania and South Australia.

The wingspan is about 20 mm. The wings are pale yellow with veins accentuated in dark brown.
