= Rhagophanes =

Scientific classification
- Kingdom: Animalia
- Phylum: Arthropoda
- Clade: Pancrustacea
- Class: Insecta
- Order: Lepidoptera
- Superfamily: Noctuoidea
- Family: Erebidae
- Subfamily: Arctiinae
- Tribe: Lithosiini
- Genus: Rhagophanes; Zeller, 1853
- Species: R. tortriciformis

Binomial name
- Rhagophanes tortriciformis Zeller, 1853

Genus of moths

Rhagophanes is a monotypic moth genus in the subfamily Arctiinae. Its single species, Rhagophanes tortriciformis, is found on Java in Indonesia. Both the genus and species were first described by Philipp Christoph Zeller in 1853.
