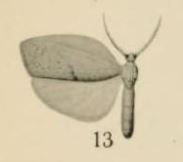

Scientific classification
- Kingdom: Animalia
- Phylum: Arthropoda
- Class: Insecta
- Order: Lepidoptera
- Superfamily: Noctuoidea
- Family: Erebidae
- Subfamily: Arctiinae
- Tribe: Lithosiini
- Genus: Lobilema; Aurivillius, 1910
- Species: L. conspersa

Binomial name
- Lobilema conspersa Aurivillius, 1910

= Lobilema =

Genus of moths

Lobilema is a genus of moths in the subfamily Arctiinae. It contains the single species Lobilema conspersa, which is found in Tanzania.
