= Disaulota =

Scientific classification
- Kingdom: Animalia
- Phylum: Arthropoda
- Class: Insecta
- Order: Lepidoptera
- Superfamily: Noctuoidea
- Family: Erebidae
- Subfamily: Arctiinae
- Tribe: Lithosiini
- Genus: Disaulota; Hampson, 1900
- Species: D. leptalina

Binomial name
- Disaulota leptalina (H. Druce, 1885)

Synonyms
- Areva leptalina Druce, 1885

Genus of moths

Disaulota is a monotypic moth genus in the subfamily Arctiinae erected by George Hampson in 1900. Its single species, Disaulota leptalina, was first described by Herbert Druce in 1885. It is found in Costa Rica.
