= Asurgylla =

Scientific classification
- Domain: Eukaryota
- Kingdom: Animalia
- Phylum: Arthropoda
- Class: Insecta
- Order: Lepidoptera
- Superfamily: Noctuoidea
- Family: Erebidae
- Subfamily: Arctiinae
- Tribe: Lithosiini
- Genus: Asurgylla; Kiriakoff, 1958
- Species: A. collenettei

Binomial name
- Asurgylla collenettei Kiriakoff, 1958

Genus of moths

Asurgylla is a monotypic moth genus in the subfamily Arctiinae erected by Sergius G. Kiriakoff in 1958. Its single species, Asurgylla collenettei, described in the same publication, is found in Kenya and Uganda.
