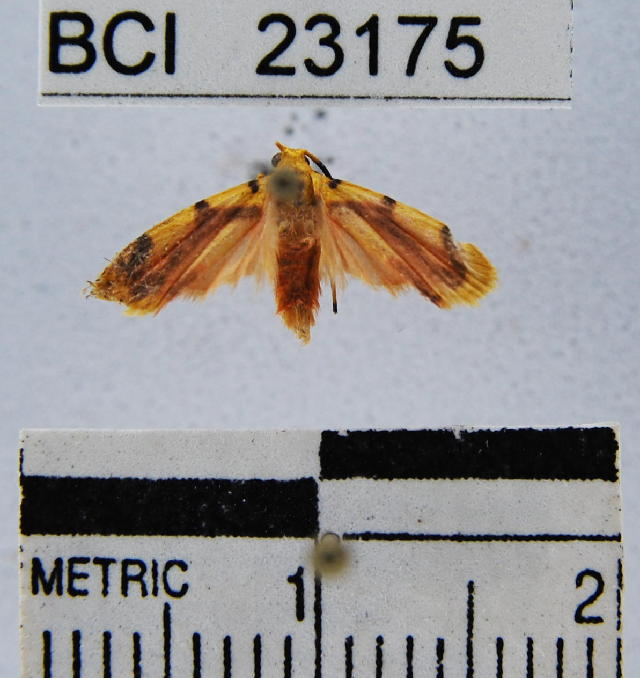

Scientific classification
- Domain: Eukaryota
- Kingdom: Animalia
- Phylum: Arthropoda
- Class: Insecta
- Order: Lepidoptera
- Superfamily: Noctuoidea
- Family: Erebidae
- Subfamily: Arctiinae
- Tribe: Lithosiini
- Genus: Gaudeator; Dyar, 1914
- Species: G. paidicus

Binomial name
- Gaudeator paidicus Dyar, 1914

= Gaudeator =

Genus of moths

Gaudeator is a monotypic moth genus in the subfamily Arctiinae. Its single species, Gaudeator paidicus, is found in Panama. Both the genus and species were first described by Harrison Gray Dyar Jr. in 1914.
