= Chrysaegliodes =

Scientific classification
- Kingdom: Animalia
- Phylum: Arthropoda
- Class: Insecta
- Order: Lepidoptera
- Superfamily: Noctuoidea
- Family: Erebidae
- Subfamily: Arctiinae
- Tribe: Lithosiini
- Genus: Chrysaegliodes; Strand, 1912
- Species: C. noliformis

Binomial name
- Chrysaegliodes noliformis Strand, 1912

Genus of moths

Chrysaegliodes is a genus of moths in the subfamily Arctiinae. It contains the single species Chrysaegliodes noliformis, which is found in Gabon.
