= Halurgia =

Scientific classification
- Domain: Eukaryota
- Kingdom: Animalia
- Phylum: Arthropoda
- Class: Insecta
- Order: Lepidoptera
- Superfamily: Noctuoidea
- Family: Erebidae
- Subfamily: Arctiinae
- Tribe: Lithosiini
- Genus: Halurgia; Herrich-Schäffer, 1855
- Species: H. aurorina

Binomial name
- Halurgia aurorina Herrich-Schäffer, 1855

Genus of moths

Halurgia is a monotypic moth genus in the subfamily Arctiinae. Its single species is Halurgia aurorina. Both the genus and species were first described by Gottlieb August Wilhelm Herrich-Schäffer in 1855.
