= Rhodographa =

Scientific classification
- Domain: Eukaryota
- Kingdom: Animalia
- Phylum: Arthropoda
- Class: Insecta
- Order: Lepidoptera
- Superfamily: Noctuoidea
- Family: Erebidae
- Subfamily: Arctiinae
- Tribe: Lithosiini
- Genus: Rhodographa; Schaus, 1899
- Species: R. phaeoplaga

Binomial name
- Rhodographa phaeoplaga Schaus, 1899

Genus of moths

Rhodographa is a monotypic moth genus in the subfamily Arctiinae. Its single species, Rhodographa phaeoplaga, is found in São Paulo, Brazil. Both the genus and species were first described by William Schaus in 1899.
