= Carilephia =

Scientific classification
- Domain: Eukaryota
- Kingdom: Animalia
- Phylum: Arthropoda
- Class: Insecta
- Order: Lepidoptera
- Superfamily: Noctuoidea
- Family: Erebidae
- Subfamily: Arctiinae
- Tribe: Lithosiini
- Genus: Carilephia; Schaus, 1924
- Species: C. moninna

Binomial name
- Carilephia moninna Schaus, 1924

Genus of moths

Carilephia is a genus of moths in the subfamily Arctiinae. It contains the single species Carilephia moninna, which is found on the Philippines (Luzon).
