= Neomulona =

Scientific classification
- Kingdom: Animalia
- Phylum: Arthropoda
- Class: Insecta
- Order: Lepidoptera
- Superfamily: Noctuoidea
- Family: Erebidae
- Subfamily: Arctiinae
- Genus: Neomulona; Hampson, 1914
- Species: N. torniplaga

Binomial name
- Neomulona torniplaga (E. D. Jones, 1914)

Synonyms
- Clemensia torniplaga E. D. Jones, 1914

Genus of moths

Neomulona is a monotypic moth genus in the subfamily Arctiinae erected by George Hampson in 1914. Its single species, Neomulona torniplaga, was first described by E. Dukinfield Jones in 1914. It is found in Brazil.
