= Nudur =

Scientific classification
- Kingdom: Animalia
- Phylum: Arthropoda
- Class: Insecta
- Order: Lepidoptera
- Superfamily: Noctuoidea
- Family: Erebidae
- Subfamily: Arctiinae
- Genus: Nudur; Dyar, 1914
- Species: N. fractivittarum

Binomial name
- Nudur fractivittarum Dyar, 1914

Synonyms
- Nudur rubrimediana Reich, 1934

Genus of moths

Nudur is a genus of moths in the subfamily Arctiinae. It contains the single species Nudur fractivittarum, which is found in Mexico, Costa Rica and Panama.
