= Neozana =

Scientific classification
- Kingdom: Animalia
- Phylum: Arthropoda
- Class: Insecta
- Order: Lepidoptera
- Superfamily: Noctuoidea
- Family: Erebidae
- Subfamily: Arctiinae
- Genus: Neozana; Hampson, 1914
- Species: N. germana

Binomial name
- Neozana germana (Rothschild, 1913)

Synonyms
- Odozana germana Rothschild, 1913

Genus of moths

Neozana is a genus of moths in the subfamily Arctiinae. It contains the single species Neozana germana, which is found in Peru.
