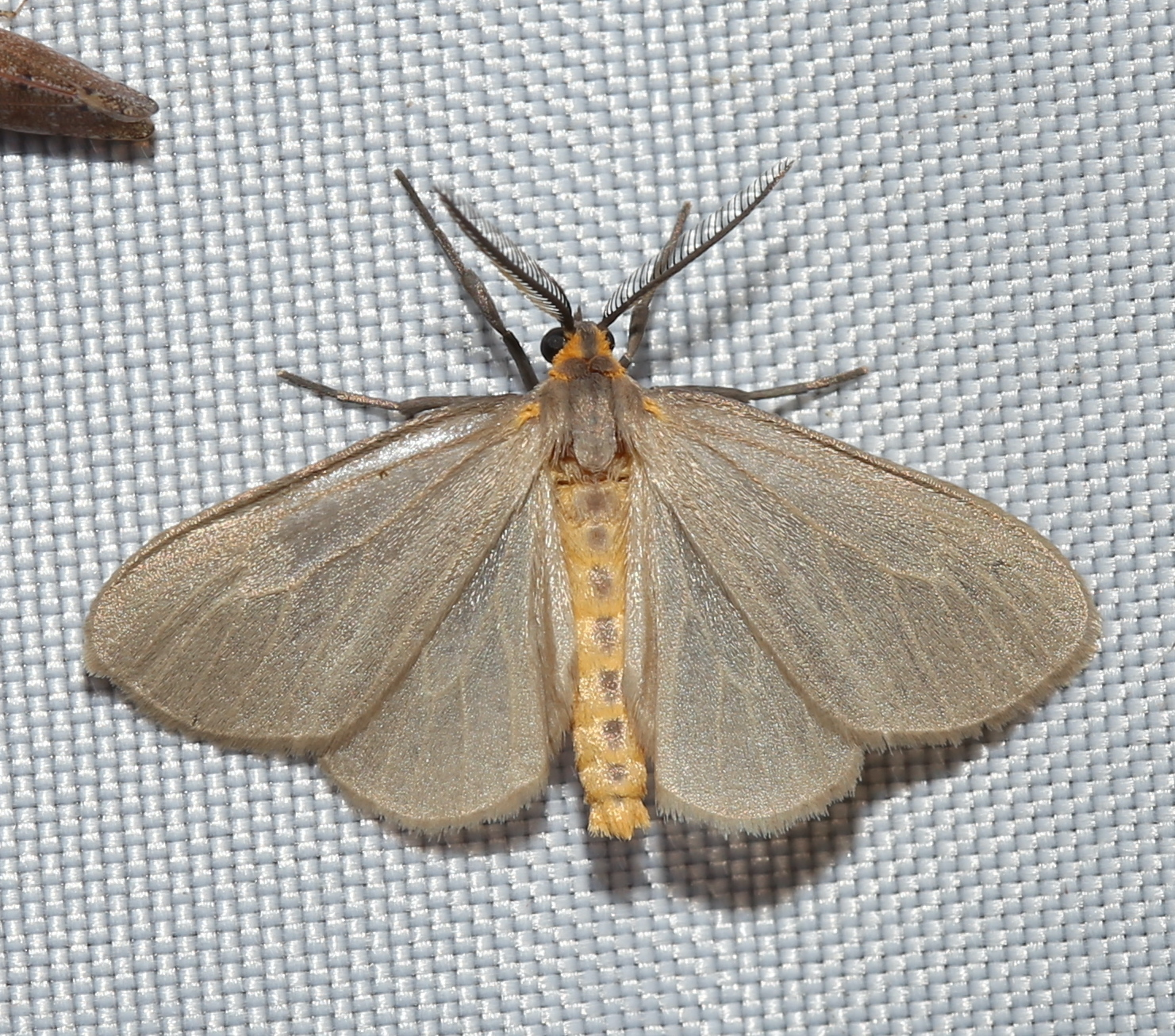
- Pagara simplex

Scientific classification
- Kingdom: Animalia
- Phylum: Arthropoda
- Clade: Pancrustacea
- Class: Insecta
- Order: Lepidoptera
- Superfamily: Noctuoidea
- Family: Erebidae
- Subfamily: Arctiinae
- Genus: Pagara; Walker, 1856
- Species: P. simplex

Binomial name
- Pagara simplex Walker, 1856

Synonyms
- Generic: Comacla Walker, [1865]; Vanessodes Grote & Robinson, 1870; Specific: Comacla murina Walker, [1865]; Vanessodes clarus Grote & Robinson, 1870; Ameria texana French, 1889

= Pagara =

Genus of moths

Pagara is a monotypic genus of moths in the family Erebidae. Its only species, Pagara simplex, the mouse-colored lichen moth, is found in North America, where it has been recorded from Alabama, Arkansas, Florida, Georgia, Illinois, Indiana, Iowa, Kansas, Kentucky, Maryland, Mississippi, New Hampshire, North Carolina, Ohio, Oklahoma, South Carolina and Tennessee. Both the genus and species were described by Francis Walker in 1856.

The wingspan is about 23 mm. Adults have been recorded on wing year round in the southern part of the range.

== Former species ==
- Pagara fuscipes (Grote, 1883)
