= Megalobosia =

Scientific classification
- Kingdom: Animalia
- Phylum: Arthropoda
- Class: Insecta
- Order: Lepidoptera
- Superfamily: Noctuoidea
- Family: Erebidae
- Subfamily: Arctiinae
- Genus: Megalobosia; Hampson, 1914
- Species: M. recurviloba

Binomial name
- Megalobosia recurviloba (Rothschild, 1912)

Synonyms
- Garudinodes recurviloba Rothschild, 1912

Genus of moths

Megalobosia is a genus of moths in the subfamily Arctiinae. It contains the single species Megalobosia recurviloba, which is found in New Guinea.
