= Tmetoptera =

Scientific classification
- Domain: Eukaryota
- Kingdom: Animalia
- Phylum: Arthropoda
- Class: Insecta
- Order: Lepidoptera
- Superfamily: Noctuoidea
- Family: Erebidae
- Subfamily: Arctiinae
- Genus: Tmetoptera; Felder, 1874
- Species: T. phryganeoides

Binomial name
- Tmetoptera phryganeoides Felder, 1874

Synonyms
- Tmetoptera phryganoides Hampson, 1900

Genus of moths

Tmetoptera is a genus of moths in the subfamily Arctiinae. It contains the single species Tmetoptera phryganeoides, which is found in Brazil.
