= Comachara =

Scientific classification
- Domain: Eukaryota
- Kingdom: Animalia
- Phylum: Arthropoda
- Class: Insecta
- Order: Lepidoptera
- Superfamily: Noctuoidea
- Family: Noctuidae
- Subfamily: Acronictinae
- Genus: Comachara; Franclemont, 1939
- Species: C. cadburyi

Binomial name
- Comachara cadburyi Franclemont, 1939

Genus of moths

Comachara is a monotypic moth genus in the family Noctuidae. Its single species, Comachara cadburyi, or Cadbury's lichen moth, is found in eastern North America, including Alabama, Florida, Georgia, Kentucky, Maryland, New Jersey, New York, North Carolina, Ohio, Pennsylvania, South Carolina, Tennessee, Texas and West Virginia. Both the genus and species were first described by John G. Franclemont in 1939.
