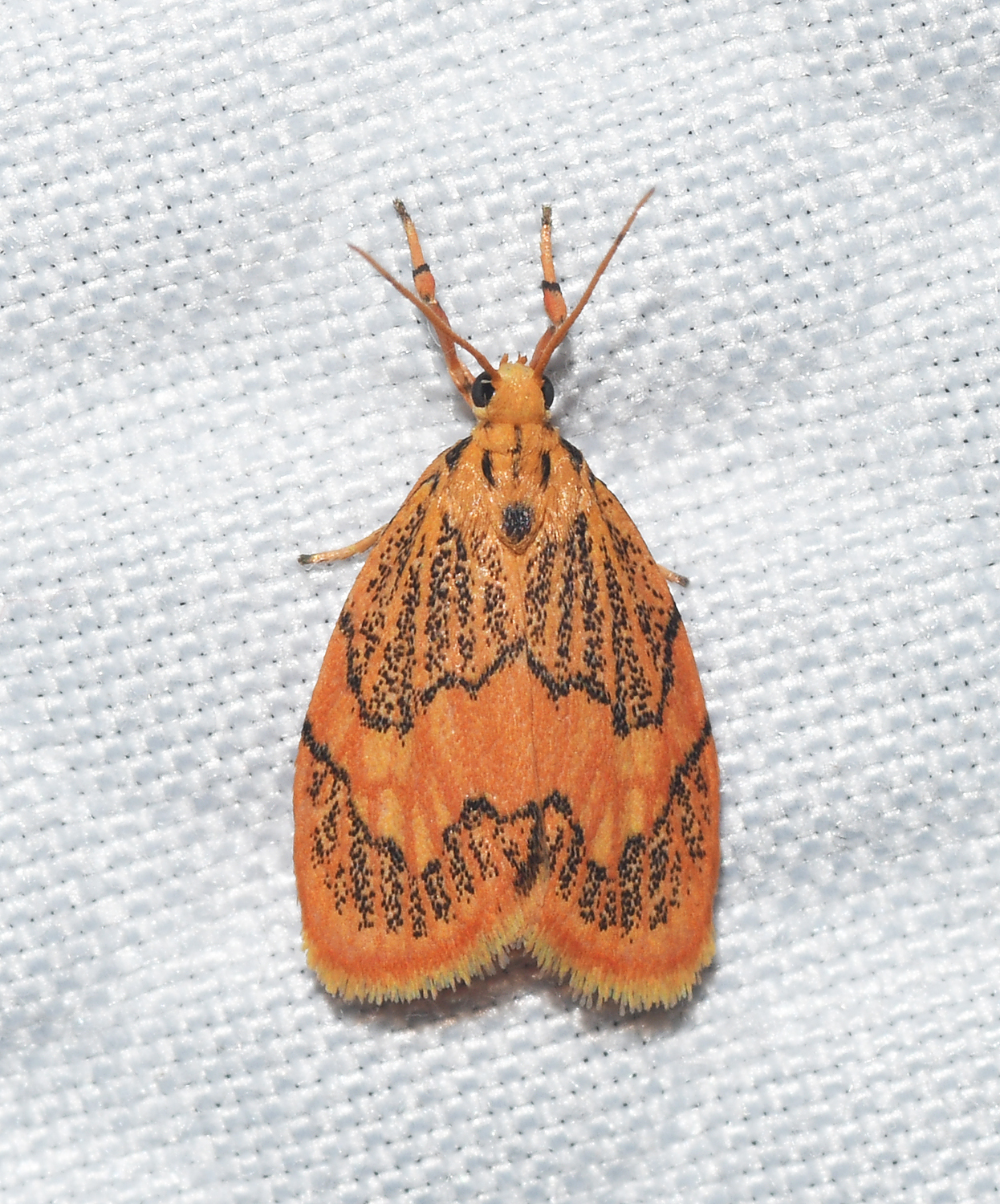

Scientific classification
- Kingdom: Animalia
- Phylum: Arthropoda
- Class: Insecta
- Order: Lepidoptera
- Superfamily: Noctuoidea
- Family: Erebidae
- Subfamily: Arctiinae
- Genus: Abrochocis; Dyar, 1914
- Species: A. esperanza

Binomial name
- Abrochocis esperanza Dyar, 1914

= Abrochocis =

Genus of moths

Abrochocis is a monotypic moth genus in the subfamily Arctiinae. Its single species, Abrochocis esperanza, is found in Panama. Both the genus and the species were first described by Harrison Gray Dyar Jr. in 1914.
