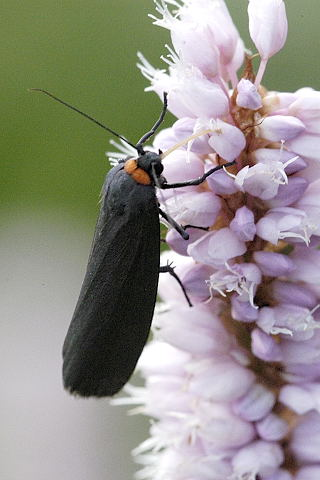
- Atolmis rubricollis

Scientific classification
- Domain: Eukaryota
- Kingdom: Animalia
- Phylum: Arthropoda
- Class: Insecta
- Order: Lepidoptera
- Superfamily: Noctuoidea
- Family: Erebidae
- Subfamily: Arctiinae
- Tribe: Lithosiini; Billberg, 1820

= Lithosiini =

Tribe of moths

The Lithosiini are a tribe of lichen moths in the family Erebidae. The taxon was described by Gustaf Johan Billberg in 1820.

== Systematics ==
The tribe was previously treated as a higher-level taxon, the subfamily Lithosiinae, within the lichen and tiger moth family, Arctiidae. The ranks of the family and its subdivisions were lowered in a recent reclassification while keeping the contents of the family and its subdivisions largely unchanged. These changes in rank triggered changes in the suffixes in the names. The family Arctiidae as a whole was reclassified as the subfamily Arctiinae within the family Erebidae. The original subfamily Lithosiinae was lowered to tribe status as Lithosiini, and its original tribes were lowered to subtribe status by changing the -ini suffix to -ina (e.g., Acsalini became Acsalina). Thus the present name "Lithosiini" used to refer to only a subgroup of the entire lichen moth group (Lithosiinae), but now it refers to the entire group.

The systematics of the Lithosiini are in need of revision. For example, the proposed subtribes Afridina, Cisthenina, Endrosina and Eudesmina require validation and delimitation of content. The arrangement followed here is based on the preliminary consensus list of Savela (2007).

The tribe currently contains about 2752 species.

== Subtribes (former tribes) ==
Many genera in the tribe Lithosiini are included in the following subtribes, while the others are incertae sedis.

- Acsalina
- Cisthenina
- Endrosina
- Eudesmiina
- Lithosiina
- Nudariina
- Phryganopterygina
- Incertae sedis
