= Incertae sedis (Arctiinae) =

List of moth genera

The large moth subfamily Arctiinae (the tiger moths), contains the following genera that have not yet been classified into one of the three tribes in the subfamily. This is a list of 167 extant genera, representing around 732 extant species, (plus one monotypic enxinct genus) out of more than 9,000 in the whole of Arctiinae.

- Abnormipterus
- Aethria
- Agunaix
- Agyrtidia
- Agyrtiola
- Alandria
- Amatula
- Anaphlebia
- Aphra
- Apocerea
- Archithosia
- Arctiites
- Are
- Atyphopsis
- Autochloris
- Axiopoeniella
- Burtia
- Cacostatia
- Callopepla
- Calonotos
- Ceramidiodes
- Cercocladia
- Cercopimorpha
- Clystea
- Corematura
- Crocomela
- Ctenuchidia
- Diaxanthia
- Didaphne
- Disasuridia
- Dixophlebia
- Dubianaclia
- Ecdemus
- Enope
- Epanycles
- Epectaptera
- Epitoxis
- Eriphioides
- Euagra
- Euchlorostola
- Euclera
- Eucyanoides
- Eumenogaster
- Eupyra
- Eurata
- Eutomis
- Fletcherinia
- Galtarodes
- Gangamela
- Grammarctia
- Heliactinidia
- Heliura
- Herea
- Histioea
- Homoneuronia
- Hoppiana
- Horamella
- Hyalaethea
- Hyda
- Hypatia
- Hypocharis
- Hypocladia
- Ichoria
- Ixylasia
- Laelapia
- Lepidoneiva
- Leptoceryx
- Leucopleura
- Loxomima
- Loxozona
- Maculonaclia
- Magnoptera
- Marecidia
- Melanonaclia
- Mesocerea
- Metacrocea
- Metaloba
- Metamya
- Metastatia
- Methysia
- Micragrella
- Micragyrta
- Microgiton
- Micronaclia
- Midara
- Mimagyrta
- Mydromera
- Myopsyche
- Mystrocneme
- Nannoceryx
- Neeressa
- Neotrichura
- Nepita
- Neritonaclia
- Orcynia
- Oreoceryx
- Osmocneme
- Paraceryx
- Paradinia
- Paralaethia
- Paramevania
- Paramyopsyche
- Paraplastis
- Paraplesis
- Parascepsis
- Parastatia
- Patreliura
- Pezaptera
- Phaenarete
- Phaeosphecia
- Phaio
- Phoeniostacta
- Pleurosoma
- Poecilosoma
- Pompiliodes
- Pompilopsis
- Praemastus
- Procalypta
- Procanthia
- Proctocopis
- Proschaliphora
- Prosopidia
- Protracta
- Prytania
- Pseudaclytia
- Pseudaethria
- Pseudoceryx
- Pseudonaclia
- Pseudophaio
- Pseudopompilia
- Pseudosphecosoma
- Pseudosphenoptera
- Psichotoe
- Ptychotricos
- Quadrasura
- Romualdisca
- Sarosa
- Sauritinia
- Scelilasia
- Sciopsyche
- Secusio
- Sesiura
- Soganaclia
- Sphecops
- Stictonaclia
- Syntrichura
- Telioneura
- Tenuinaclia
- Thumathoides
- Thyrogonia
- Thyrosticta
- Tigridania
- Timalus
- Tipulodes
- Toulgoetinaclia
- Trichaeta
- Tritonaclia
- Tsarafidynia
- Tsirananaclia
- Uraga
- Urolosia
- Vadonaclia
- Vulsinia
- Xantharete
- Xanthomis
- Xanthopleura
- Zellatilla
- Zigira
