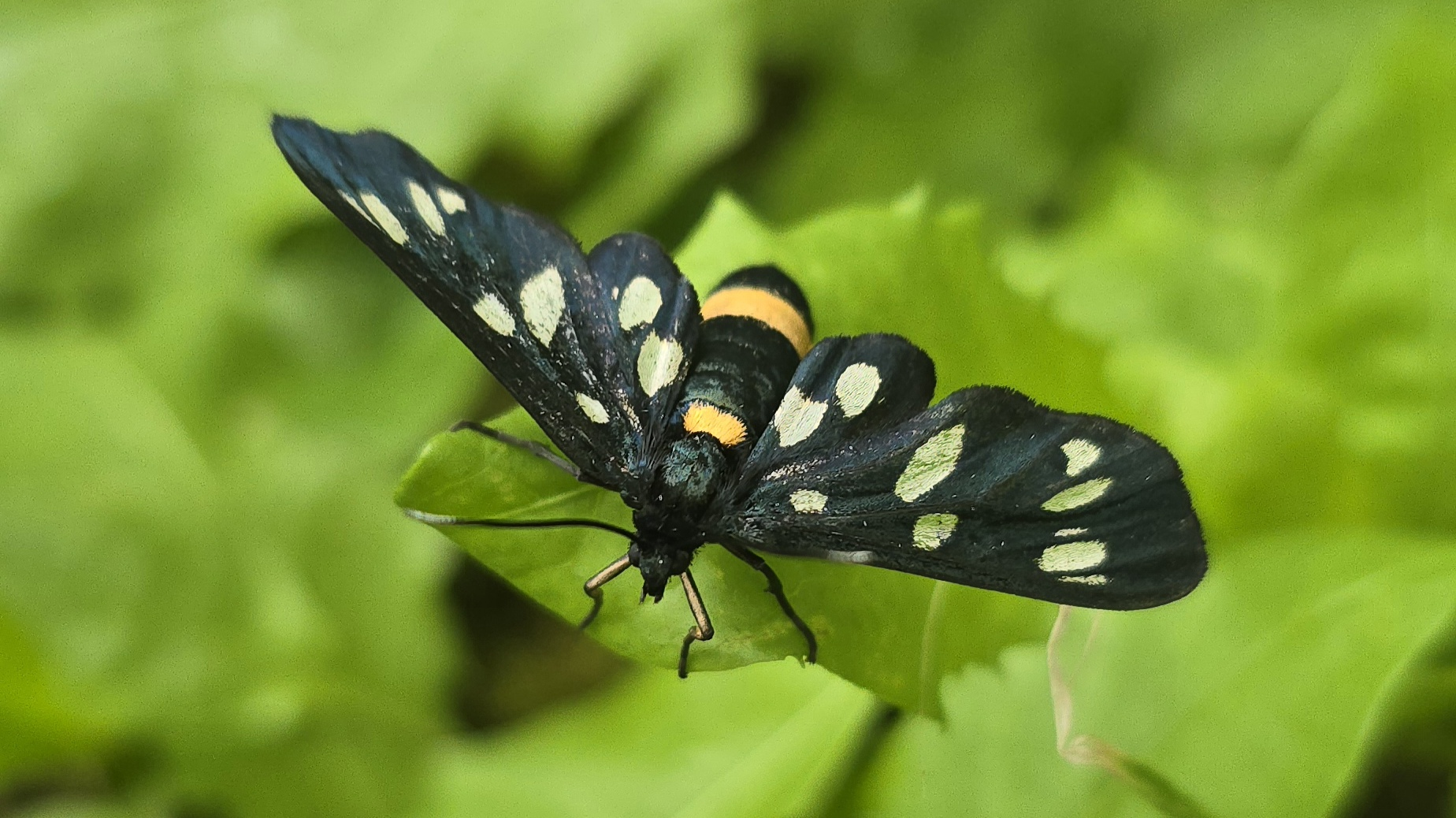
- Amata phegea, the nine-spotted moth

Scientific classification
- Kingdom: Animalia
- Phylum: Arthropoda
- Clade: Pancrustacea
- Class: Insecta
- Order: Lepidoptera
- Superfamily: Noctuoidea
- Family: Erebidae
- Subfamily: Arctiinae
- Tribe: Syntomini; Herrich-Schäffer, 1846

= Syntomini =

Tribe of moths

The Syntomini are a tribe of tiger moths in the family Erebidae. The tribe was erected by Gottlieb August Wilhelm Herrich-Schäffer in 1846.

== Taxonomy ==
The tribe used to be classified in the former subfamily Ctenuchinae of the former family Arctiidae.

The wingspan of a typical syntomine is about 11-14 millimeters. Their abdomen is commonly either completely yellow, or black with one or more bands of yellow.

== Genera ==
The following genera are included in the tribe.

- Amata Fabricius, 1807 [=*Syntomis Ochsenheimer, 1808 type genus]
- Anapisa Kiriakoff, 1952
- Apisa Walker, 1855
- Auriculoceryx Holloway, 1988
- Automolis Hübner, 1819
- Balacra Walker, 1856
- Bergeria Kiriakoff, 1952
- Cacosoma (Boisduval, 1847)
- Caeneressa Obraztsov, 1957
- Ceryx Wallengren, 1863
- Dubianaclia Griveaud, 1964
- Dysauxes Hübner, [1819]
- Eressa Walker, 1854
- Fletcherinia Griveaud, 1964
- Gippius Walker, 1855
- Hippurarctia Kiriakoff, 1953
- Maculonaclia Griveaud, 1964
- Meganaclia Aurivillius, 1892
- Melanonaclia Griveaud, 1964
- Melisa Walker, 1854
- Melisoides Strand, 1912
- Metamicroptera Hulstaert, 1923
- Metarctia Walker, 1855
- Microbergeria Kiriakoff, 1972
- Micronaclia Hampson, 1898
- Nacliodes Strand, 1912
- Neobalacra Kiriakoff, 1952
- Neophemula Kiriakoff, 1957
- Oligamatites Kusnetzov, 1928
- Owambarctia Kiriakoff, 1957
- Paramelisa Aurivillius, 1906
- Pseudmelisa Hampson, 1910
- Pseudodiptera Kaye, 1918
- Pseudonaclia Butler, 1876
- Pseudothyretes Dufrane, 1945
- Rhipidarctia Kiriakoff, 1953
- Soganaclia Griveaud, 1964
- Stictonaclia Hampson, 1898
- Streptophlebia Hampson, 1898
- Syntomoides Hampson, 1893
- Tenuinaclia Griveaud, 1964
- Thyrosticta Hampson, 1898
- Thyretes Boisduval, 1847
- Toulgoetinaclia Griveaud, 1964
- Trichaetoides Holloway, 1988
- Tritonaclia Hampson, 1898
- Tsarafidynia Griveaud, 1964
- Tsirananaclia Griveaud, 1964
- Vadonaclia Griveaud, 1964
- Vitronaclia Griveaud, 1964 (may be a synonym of Amata)
