= Urolosia opalocincta =

Scientific classification
- Domain: Eukaryota
- Kingdom: Animalia
- Phylum: Arthropoda
- Class: Insecta
- Order: Lepidoptera
- Superfamily: Noctuoidea
- Family: Erebidae
- Subfamily: Arctiinae
- Genus: Urolosia
- Species: U. opalocincta

Binomial name
- Urolosia opalocincta H. Druce, 1898

Species of moth

Urolosia opalocincta is a moth in the subfamily Arctiinae. It was described by Herbert Druce in 1898. It is found in French Guiana.
