= Vitronaclia =

Scientific classification
- Kingdom: Animalia
- Phylum: Arthropoda
- Class: Insecta
- Order: Lepidoptera
- Superfamily: Noctuoidea
- Family: Erebidae
- Subfamily: Arctiinae
- Tribe: Syntomini
- Genus: Vitronaclia; Griveaud, 1964

Genus of moths

Vitronaclia is a genus of moth in the family Arctiinae. The genus was erected by Griveaud, 1964. Later the genus is treated as valid member of the Syntomini in a phylogenetic study that included many Madagascan taxa.

== Species ==
- Vitronaclia sogai Griveaud, 1964 – Madagascar
- Vitronaclia veronica (Oberthür, 1893) – Madagascar
