= Mesocerea apicalis =

Scientific classification
- Domain: Eukaryota
- Kingdom: Animalia
- Phylum: Arthropoda
- Class: Insecta
- Order: Lepidoptera
- Superfamily: Noctuoidea
- Family: Erebidae
- Subfamily: Arctiinae
- Genus: Mesocerea
- Species: M. apicalis

Binomial name
- Mesocerea apicalis (Rothschild, 1911)

Synonyms
- Teucer apicalis Rothschild, 1911; Delphyre leucomela Kaye, 1919

Species of moth

Mesocerea apicalis is a moth of the subfamily Arctiinae. It is found in Suriname and French Guiana.
