= Hypocladia elongata =

Scientific classification
- Domain: Eukaryota
- Kingdom: Animalia
- Phylum: Arthropoda
- Class: Insecta
- Order: Lepidoptera
- Superfamily: Noctuoidea
- Family: Erebidae
- Subfamily: Arctiinae
- Genus: Hypocladia
- Species: H. elongata

Binomial name
- Hypocladia elongata H. Druce, 1905

Species of moth

Hypocladia elongata is a moth of the subfamily Arctiinae. It was described by Herbert Druce in 1905. It is found in Venezuela.
