= Callopepla grandis =

Scientific classification
- Domain: Eukaryota
- Kingdom: Animalia
- Phylum: Arthropoda
- Class: Insecta
- Order: Lepidoptera
- Superfamily: Noctuoidea
- Family: Erebidae
- Subfamily: Arctiinae
- Genus: Callopepla
- Species: C. grandis

Binomial name
- Callopepla grandis Rothschild, 1912

Species of moth

Callopepla grandis is a moth of the subfamily Arctiinae. It was described by Rothschild in 1912. It is found in Brazil.
