= Timalus caeruleus =

Scientific classification
- Kingdom: Animalia
- Phylum: Arthropoda
- Clade: Pancrustacea
- Class: Insecta
- Order: Lepidoptera
- Superfamily: Noctuoidea
- Family: Erebidae
- Subfamily: Arctiinae
- Genus: Timalus
- Species: T. caeruleus

Binomial name
- Timalus caeruleus (Hampson, 1898)

Synonyms
- Pterygopterus caeruleus Hampson, 1898

Species of moth

Timalus caeruleus is a moth in the subfamily Arctiinae. It was described by George Hampson in 1898. It is found in Mexico.
