= Agyrtidia uranophila =

Scientific classification
- Kingdom: Animalia
- Phylum: Arthropoda
- Class: Insecta
- Order: Lepidoptera
- Superfamily: Noctuoidea
- Family: Erebidae
- Subfamily: Arctiinae
- Genus: Agyrtidia
- Species: A. uranophila

Binomial name
- Agyrtidia uranophila (Walker, 1866)

Synonyms
- Eucyane uranophila Walker, 1866

Species of moth

Agyrtidia uranophila is a moth of the subfamily Arctiinae. It was described by Francis Walker in 1866. It is found in São Paulo in Brazil and in Peru.

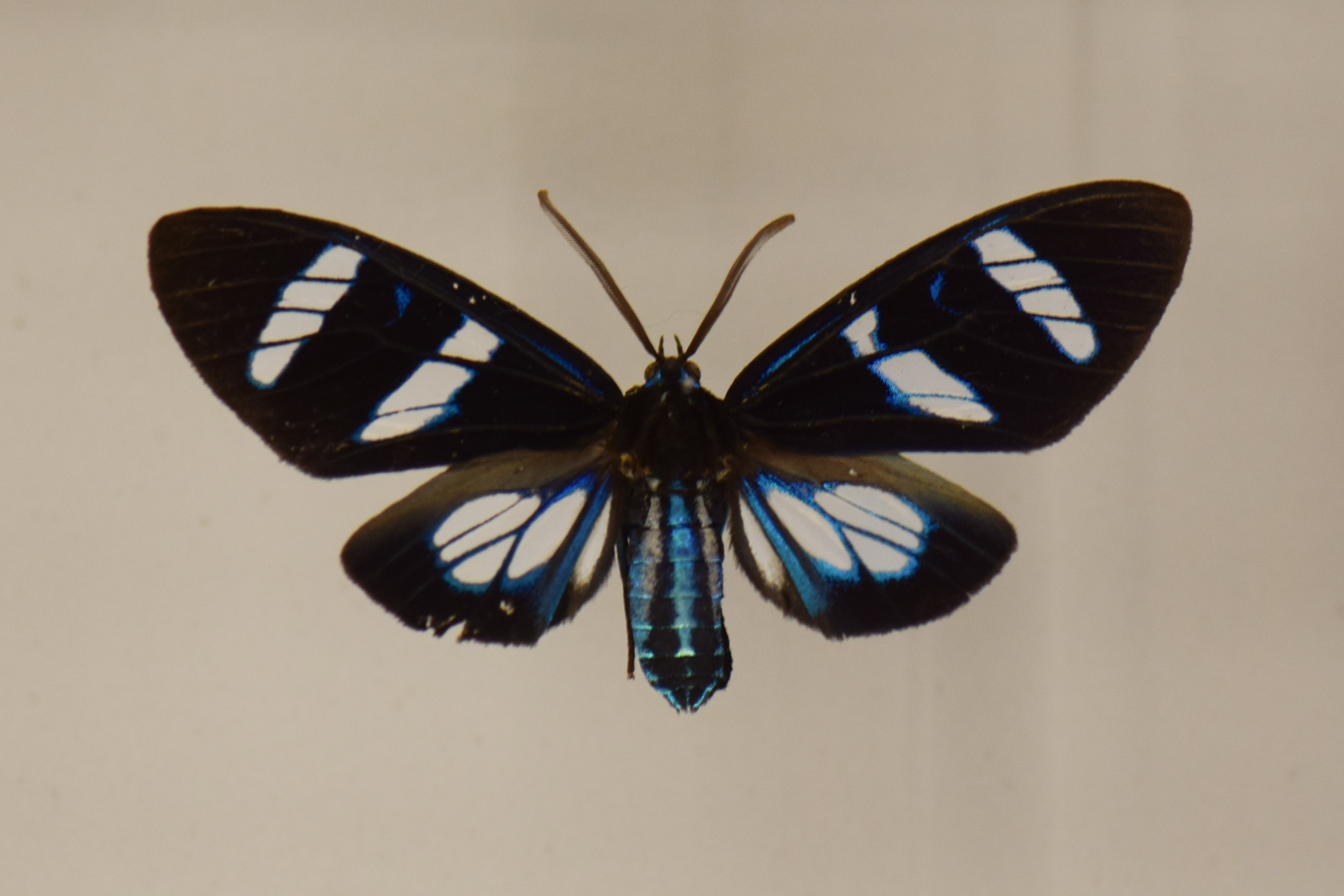
A moth found in Brazil
