= Gangamela ira =

Scientific classification
- Domain: Eukaryota
- Kingdom: Animalia
- Phylum: Arthropoda
- Class: Insecta
- Order: Lepidoptera
- Superfamily: Noctuoidea
- Family: Erebidae
- Subfamily: Arctiinae
- Genus: Gangamela
- Species: G. ira

Binomial name
- Gangamela ira (H. Druce, 1896)

Synonyms
- Charidea ira H. Druce, 1896

Species of moth

Gangamela ira is a moth of the subfamily Arctiinae. It was described by Herbert Druce in 1896. It is found in Panama.
