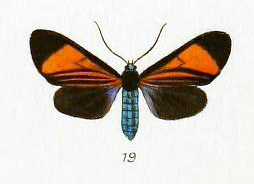

Scientific classification
- Kingdom: Animalia
- Phylum: Arthropoda
- Clade: Pancrustacea
- Class: Insecta
- Order: Lepidoptera
- Superfamily: Noctuoidea
- Family: Erebidae
- Subfamily: Arctiinae
- Genus: Callopepla
- Species: C. inachia

Binomial name
- Callopepla inachia (Schaus, 1892)

Synonyms
- Charidea inachia Schaus, 1892; Charidea katima Schaus, 1896

= Callopepla inachia =

Species of moth

Callopepla inachia is a moth of the subfamily Arctiinae. It was described by Schaus in 1892. It is found in Brazil and Argentina.
