= Callopepla emarginata =

Scientific classification
- Kingdom: Animalia
- Phylum: Arthropoda
- Class: Insecta
- Order: Lepidoptera
- Superfamily: Noctuoidea
- Family: Erebidae
- Subfamily: Arctiinae
- Genus: Callopepla
- Species: C. emarginata

Binomial name
- Callopepla emarginata (Walker, 1854)

Synonyms
- Josia emarginata Walker, 1854

Species of moth

Callopepla emarginata is a moth of the subfamily Arctiinae. It was described by Francis Walker in 1854. It is found in São Paulo, Brazil.
