= Gangamela saturata =

Scientific classification
- Kingdom: Animalia
- Phylum: Arthropoda
- Class: Insecta
- Order: Lepidoptera
- Superfamily: Noctuoidea
- Family: Erebidae
- Subfamily: Arctiinae
- Genus: Gangamela
- Species: G. saturata

Binomial name
- Gangamela saturata Walker, 1864

Species of moth

Gangamela saturata is a moth of the subfamily Arctiinae. It was described by Francis Walker in 1864. It is found in Brazil.
