= Callopepla flammula =

Scientific classification
- Kingdom: Animalia
- Phylum: Arthropoda
- Clade: Pancrustacea
- Class: Insecta
- Order: Lepidoptera
- Superfamily: Noctuoidea
- Family: Erebidae
- Subfamily: Arctiinae
- Genus: Callopepla
- Species: C. flammula

Binomial name
- Callopepla flammula (Hübner, [1832])

Synonyms
- Calosoma flammula Hübner, [1832]

Species of moth

Callopepla flammula is a moth of the subfamily Arctiinae. It was described by Jacob Hübner in 1832. It is found in Espírito Santo, Brazil.
