= Mesocerea distincta =

Scientific classification
- Domain: Eukaryota
- Kingdom: Animalia
- Phylum: Arthropoda
- Class: Insecta
- Order: Lepidoptera
- Superfamily: Noctuoidea
- Family: Erebidae
- Subfamily: Arctiinae
- Genus: Mesocerea
- Species: M. distincta

Binomial name
- Mesocerea distincta (Rothschild, 1911)

Synonyms
- Teucer distincta Rothschild, 1911

Species of moth

Mesocerea distincta is a moth of the subfamily Arctiinae. It was described by Walter Rothschild in 1911. It is found in Suriname.
