= Loxozona nitens =

Scientific classification
- Domain: Eukaryota
- Kingdom: Animalia
- Phylum: Arthropoda
- Class: Insecta
- Order: Lepidoptera
- Superfamily: Noctuoidea
- Family: Erebidae
- Subfamily: Arctiinae
- Genus: Loxozona
- Species: L. nitens

Binomial name
- Loxozona nitens Rothschild, 1912

Species of moth

Loxozona nitens is a moth of the subfamily Arctiinae. It was described by Rothschild in 1912. It is found in French Guiana.
