= Midara balbalasanga =

Scientific classification
- Domain: Eukaryota
- Kingdom: Animalia
- Phylum: Arthropoda
- Class: Insecta
- Order: Lepidoptera
- Superfamily: Noctuoidea
- Family: Erebidae
- Subfamily: Arctiinae
- Genus: Midara
- Species: M. balbalasanga

Binomial name
- Midara balbalasanga Schaus, 1928

Species of moth

Midara balbalasanga is a moth of the subfamily Arctiinae. It was described by William Schaus in 1928. It is found in the Philippines.
