= Timalus leucomela =

Scientific classification
- Kingdom: Animalia
- Phylum: Arthropoda
- Clade: Pancrustacea
- Class: Insecta
- Order: Lepidoptera
- Superfamily: Noctuoidea
- Family: Erebidae
- Subfamily: Arctiinae
- Genus: Timalus
- Species: T. leucomela

Binomial name
- Timalus leucomela Walker, 1856

Synonyms
- Automolis leucomela Walker, 1856; Pterygopterus superbus Druce, 1884

Species of moth

Timalus leucomela is a moth in the subfamily Arctiinae. It was described by Francis Walker in 1856. It is found in Panama and Brazil (Upper Amazonas, Pará).
