= Disasuridia rubida =

Scientific classification
- Kingdom: Animalia
- Phylum: Arthropoda
- Clade: Pancrustacea
- Class: Insecta
- Order: Lepidoptera
- Superfamily: Noctuoidea
- Family: Erebidae
- Subfamily: Arctiinae
- Genus: Disasuridia
- Species: D. rubida

Binomial name
- Disasuridia rubida Fang, 1991

Species of moth

Disasuridia rubida is a moth of the subfamily Arctiinae. It was described by Cheng-Lai Fang in 1991. It is found in the Chinese province of Yunnan and in India. It is the type species of its genus.
