= Urolosia albipuncta =

Scientific classification
- Domain: Eukaryota
- Kingdom: Animalia
- Phylum: Arthropoda
- Class: Insecta
- Order: Lepidoptera
- Superfamily: Noctuoidea
- Family: Erebidae
- Subfamily: Arctiinae
- Genus: Urolosia
- Species: U. albipuncta

Binomial name
- Urolosia albipuncta Druce, 1905

Species of moth

Urolosia albipuncta is a moth in the subfamily Arctiinae. It was described by Druce in 1905. It is found in Venezuela.
