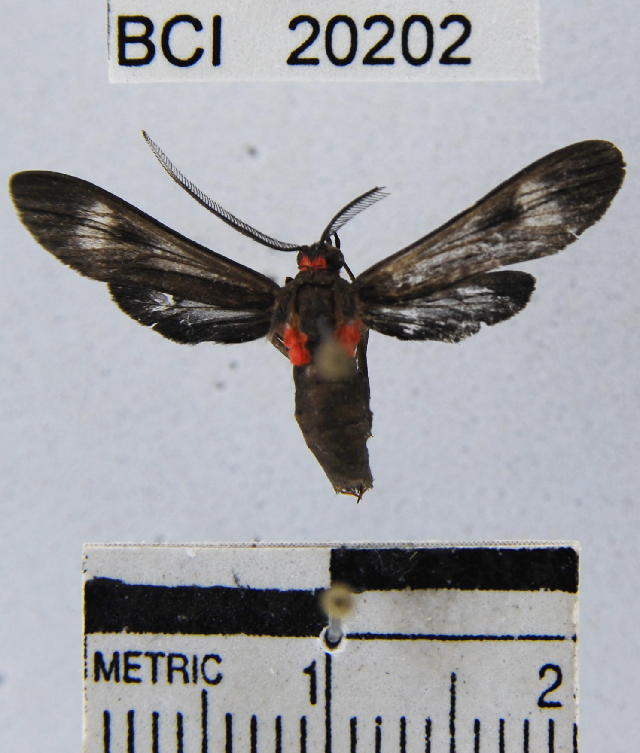

Scientific classification
- Kingdom: Animalia
- Phylum: Arthropoda
- Class: Insecta
- Order: Lepidoptera
- Superfamily: Noctuoidea
- Family: Erebidae
- Subfamily: Arctiinae
- Genus: Hypocladia
- Species: H. restricta

Binomial name
- Hypocladia restricta Hampson, 1901

= Hypocladia restricta =

Species of moth

Hypocladia restricta is a moth of the subfamily Arctiinae. It was described by George Hampson in 1901. It is found in Panama.
