= Orcynia =

Orcynia or Orkynia may refer to:

- Orcynia (moth), a genus of moths
- a place in Cappadocia, site of the Battle of Orkynia in 319 BC
- another name for the ancient Hercynian Forest
