= Agyrtidia olivensis =

Scientific classification
- Domain: Eukaryota
- Kingdom: Animalia
- Phylum: Arthropoda
- Class: Insecta
- Order: Lepidoptera
- Superfamily: Noctuoidea
- Family: Erebidae
- Subfamily: Arctiinae
- Genus: Agyrtidia
- Species: A. olivensis

Binomial name
- Agyrtidia olivensis Filho & do Rego Barros, 1970

Species of moth

Agyrtidia olivensis is a moth of the subfamily Arctiinae. It was described by Joaquim P. Machado Filho and Alfredo Rei do Régo Barros in 1970. It is found in Brazil.
