= Parastatia =

Scientific classification
- Kingdom: Animalia
- Phylum: Arthropoda
- Class: Insecta
- Order: Lepidoptera
- Superfamily: Noctuoidea
- Family: Erebidae
- Subfamily: Arctiinae
- Genus: Parastatia; Hampson, 1898
- Species: P. parnassia

Binomial name
- Parastatia parnassia (Möschler, 1878)

Synonyms
- Marissa parnassia Möschler, 1878

Genus and species of moth

Parastatia is a monotypic moth genus in the subfamily Arctiinae erected by George Hampson in 1898. Its single species, Parastatia parnassia, described by Heinrich Benno Möschler in 1878, is found in Suriname.
