= Vulsinia =

Scientific classification
- Domain: Eukaryota
- Kingdom: Animalia
- Phylum: Arthropoda
- Class: Insecta
- Order: Lepidoptera
- Superfamily: Noctuoidea
- Family: Erebidae
- Subfamily: Arctiinae
- Genus: Vulsinia; Schaus, 1928
- Species: V. socorra

Binomial name
- Vulsinia socorra Schaus, 1928

Genus of moths

Vulsinia is a monotypic moth genus in the subfamily Arctiinae described by William Schaus in 1928. Its single species, Vulsinia socorra, described by the same author in the same year, is found in the Philippines.
