= Paraceryx =

Scientific classification
- Domain: Eukaryota
- Kingdom: Animalia
- Phylum: Arthropoda
- Class: Insecta
- Order: Lepidoptera
- Superfamily: Noctuoidea
- Family: Erebidae
- Subfamily: Arctiinae
- Genus: Paraceryx; Bethune-Baker, 1904
- Species: P. aroa

Binomial name
- Paraceryx aroa Bethune-Baker, 1904

Genus of moths

Paraceryx is a genus of moths in the subfamily Arctiinae. It contains the single species Paraceryx aroa, which is found in New Guinea.
