= Laelapia =

Scientific classification
- Kingdom: Animalia
- Phylum: Arthropoda
- Class: Insecta
- Order: Lepidoptera
- Superfamily: Noctuoidea
- Family: Erebidae
- Subfamily: Arctiinae
- Genus: Laelapia; Butler, 1879
- Species: L. notata

Binomial name
- Laelapia notata Butler, 1879

Genus of moths

Laelapia is a monotypic moth genus in the family Erebidae. Its single species, Laelapia notata, is found in Madagascar. Both the genus and species were first described by Arthur Gardiner Butler in 1879.
