= Timalus =

Scientific classification
- Kingdom: Animalia
- Phylum: Arthropoda
- Class: Insecta
- Order: Lepidoptera
- Superfamily: Noctuoidea
- Family: Erebidae
- Subfamily: Arctiinae
- Genus: Timalus; Watson, 1980

Synonyms
- Pterygopterus Butler, 1876 (preocc. Kner, 1867)

Genus of moths

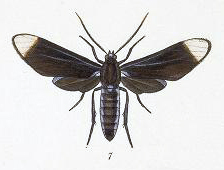
Timalus superbus

Timalus is a genus of moths in the subfamily Arctiinae.

== Species ==
- Timalus caeruleus Hampson, 1898
- Timalus clavipennis Butler, 1876
- Timalus leucomela Walker, 1856
