= Pseudopompilia =

Scientific classification
- Domain: Eukaryota
- Kingdom: Animalia
- Phylum: Arthropoda
- Class: Insecta
- Order: Lepidoptera
- Superfamily: Noctuoidea
- Family: Erebidae
- Subfamily: Arctiinae
- Genus: Pseudopompilia; H. Druce, 1898
- Species: P. mimica

Binomial name
- Pseudopompilia mimica H. Druce, 1898

Synonyms
- Pseudopompilia Hampson, 1898

Genus of moths

Pseudopompilia is a monotypic moth genus in the subfamily Arctiinae. Its single species, Pseudopompilia mimica, is found in the Amazon region. Both the genus and species were first described by Herbert Druce in 1898.
