= Paramevania =

Scientific classification
- Domain: Eukaryota
- Kingdom: Animalia
- Phylum: Arthropoda
- Class: Insecta
- Order: Lepidoptera
- Superfamily: Noctuoidea
- Family: Erebidae
- Subfamily: Arctiinae
- Genus: Paramevania; Draudt, 1915
- Species: P. inconspicua

Binomial name
- Paramevania inconspicua Draudt, 1915

Genus of moths

Paramevania is a genus of moths in the subfamily Arctiinae. It contains the single species Paramevania inconspicua, which is found in tropical America.
