= Mesocerea =

Scientific classification
- Domain: Eukaryota
- Kingdom: Animalia
- Phylum: Arthropoda
- Class: Insecta
- Order: Lepidoptera
- Superfamily: Noctuoidea
- Family: Erebidae
- Subfamily: Arctiinae
- Genus: Mesocerea; Hampson, 1914

Genus of moths

Mesocerea is a genus of moths in the subfamily Arctiinae. They occur in northern South America (Suriname, French Guiana).

== Species ==
There are two species:

- Mesocerea apicalis (Rothschild, 1911)
- Mesocerea distincta (Rothschild, 1911)
