= Protracta =

Scientific classification
- Domain: Eukaryota
- Kingdom: Animalia
- Phylum: Arthropoda
- Class: Insecta
- Order: Lepidoptera
- Superfamily: Noctuoidea
- Family: Erebidae
- Subfamily: Arctiinae
- Genus: Protracta; Gaede, 1925
- Species: P. illuminata

Binomial name
- Protracta illuminata (Maassen, 1890)

Synonyms
- Pais illuminata Maassen, 1890

Genus of moths

Protracta is a genus of moths in the subfamily Arctiinae. It contains the single species Protracta illuminata, which is found in Bolivia.
