= Neritonaclia =

Scientific classification
- Domain: Eukaryota
- Kingdom: Animalia
- Phylum: Arthropoda
- Class: Insecta
- Order: Lepidoptera
- Superfamily: Noctuoidea
- Family: Erebidae
- Subfamily: Arctiinae
- Genus: Neritonaclia; Strand, 1921
- Species: N. argenteogutta

Binomial name
- Neritonaclia argenteogutta Strand, 1920

Genus of moths

Neritonaclia is a genus of moths in the subfamily Arctiinae. It contains the single species Neritonaclia argenteogutta, which is found in Guyana.
