= Xanthomis =

Scientific classification
- Kingdom: Animalia
- Phylum: Arthropoda
- Class: Insecta
- Order: Lepidoptera
- Superfamily: Noctuoidea
- Family: Erebidae
- Subfamily: Arctiinae
- Genus: Xanthomis; Hampson, 1898
- Species: X. grandis

Binomial name
- Xanthomis grandis (H. Druce, 1884)

Synonyms
- Automolis grandis H. Druce, 1884

Genus of moths

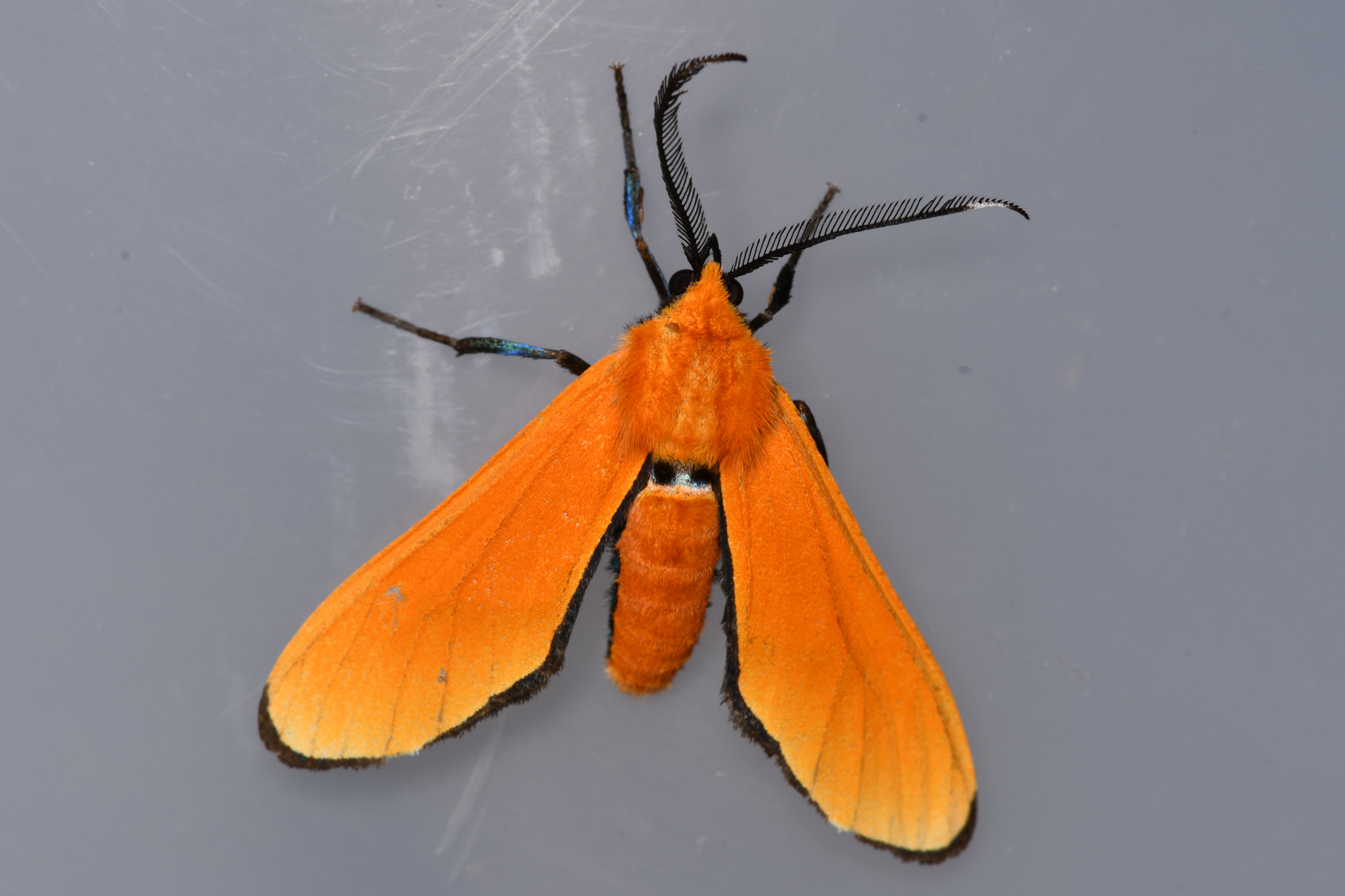

Xanthomis is a monotypic moth genus in the subfamily Arctiinae erected by George Hampson in 1898. Its single species, Xanthomis grandis, was first described by Herbert Druce in 1884. It is found in Costa Rica.
