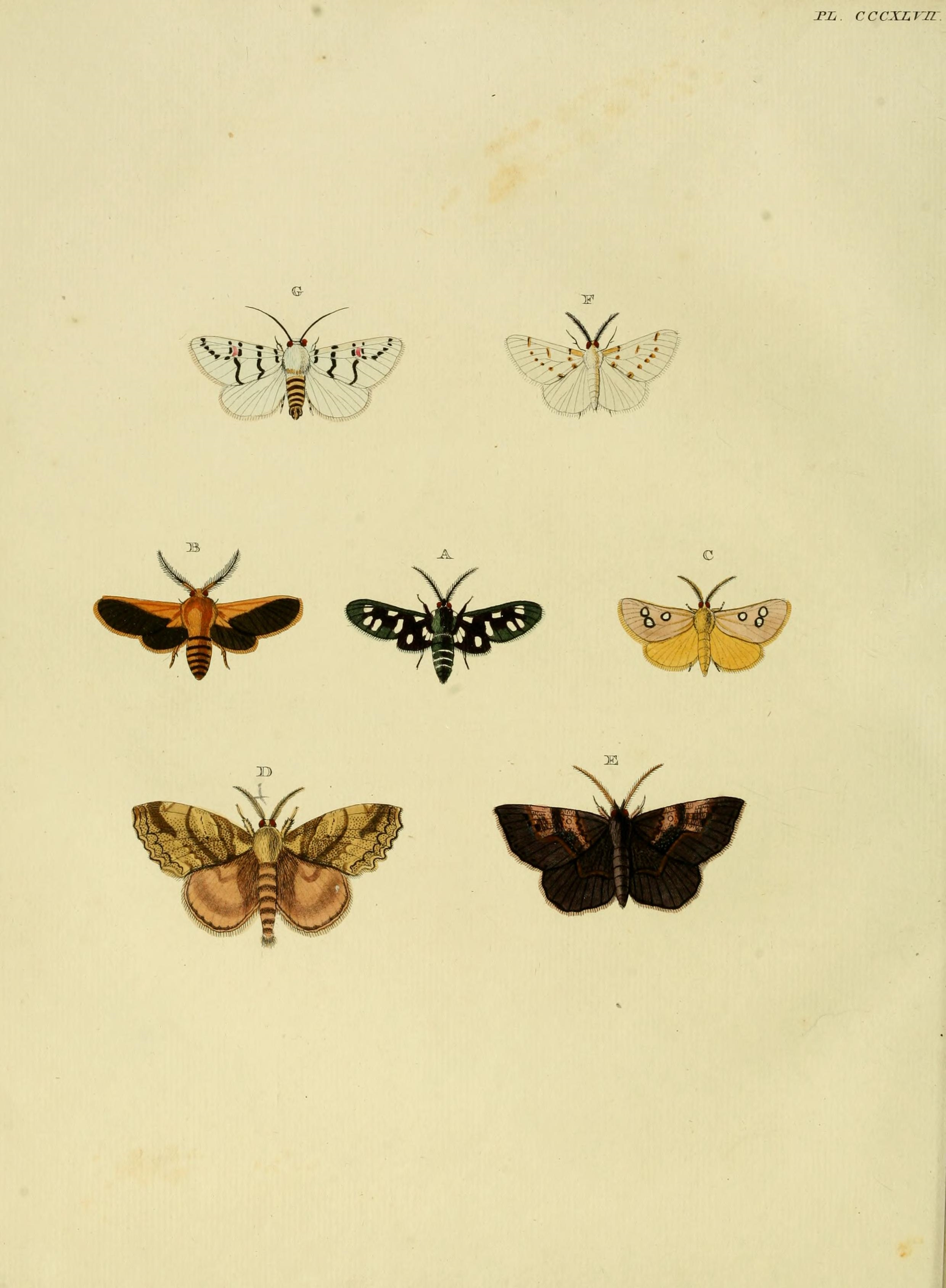

Scientific classification
- Kingdom: Animalia
- Phylum: Arthropoda
- Clade: Pancrustacea
- Class: Insecta
- Order: Lepidoptera
- Superfamily: Noctuoidea
- Family: Erebidae
- Subfamily: Arctiinae
- Genus: Eutomis; Hübner, [1819]
- Species: E. minceus

Binomial name
- Eutomis minceus (Stoll, [1781])

Synonyms
- Sphinx minceus Stoll, [1781]

= Eutomis =

Genus of moths

Eutomis is a genus of moths in the subfamily Arctiinae. It contains the single species Eutomis minceus, which is found in South Africa.
