= Scelilasia =

Scientific classification
- Kingdom: Animalia
- Phylum: Arthropoda
- Clade: Pancrustacea
- Class: Insecta
- Order: Lepidoptera
- Superfamily: Noctuoidea
- Family: Erebidae
- Subfamily: Arctiinae
- Genus: Scelilasia; Hampson, 1914
- Species: S. erythrozonata

Binomial name
- Scelilasia erythrozonata (Hampson, 1909)

Synonyms
- Lasiosceles erythrozonata Hampson, 1909

Genus of moths

Scelilasia is a genus of moths in the subfamily Arctiinae. It contains the single species Scelilasia erythrozonata, which is found in Panama and Costa Rica.
