= Callopepla =

Scientific classification
- Kingdom: Animalia
- Phylum: Arthropoda
- Class: Insecta
- Order: Lepidoptera
- Superfamily: Noctuoidea
- Family: Erebidae
- Subfamily: Arctiinae
- Genus: Callopepla; Hampson, 1898

Synonyms
- Calosoma Geyer, 1832 (preocc.); Osmacola Watson, 1980

Genus of moths

Callopepla is a genus of moths in the subfamily Arctiinae. The genus was erected by George Hampson in 1898.

== Species ==
- Callopepla emarginata (Walker, 1854)
- Callopepla flammula (Hübner, [1832])
- Callopepla grandis Rothschild, 1912
- Callopepla inachia (Schaus, 1892)
