= Thumathoides =

Scientific classification
- Kingdom: Animalia
- Phylum: Arthropoda
- Clade: Pancrustacea
- Class: Insecta
- Order: Lepidoptera
- Superfamily: Noctuoidea
- Family: Erebidae
- Subfamily: Arctiinae
- Genus: Thumathoides; Holloway, 1979
- Species: T. fumosa

Binomial name
- Thumathoides fumosa Holloway, 1979

Genus of moths

Thumathoides is a genus of moths in the subfamily Arctiinae. It contains the single species Thumathoides fumosa, which is found in New Caledonia.
