= Muxta =

Scientific classification
- Domain: Eukaryota
- Kingdom: Animalia
- Phylum: Arthropoda
- Class: Insecta
- Order: Lepidoptera
- Superfamily: Noctuoidea
- Family: Erebidae
- Subfamily: Arctiinae
- Tribe: Lithosiini
- Genus: Muxta; Birket-Smith, 1965
- Species: M. xanthopa

Binomial name
- Muxta xanthopa (Holland, 1893)

Synonyms
- Lepista xanthopa Holland, 1893; Tigrioides termineola Hampson, 1907

Genus of moths

Muxta is a genus of moths in the subfamily Arctiinae. It contains the single species Muxta xanthopa, which is found in Cameroon, the Democratic Republic of Congo, Gabon, Ghana, Kenya, Liberia, Nigeria and Uganda.
