= Agyrtiola =

Scientific classification
- Domain: Eukaryota
- Kingdom: Animalia
- Phylum: Arthropoda
- Class: Insecta
- Order: Lepidoptera
- Superfamily: Noctuoidea
- Family: Erebidae
- Subfamily: Arctiinae
- Genus: Agyrtiola; Gaede, 1926
- Species: A. niepelti

Binomial name
- Agyrtiola niepelti Gaede, 1926

Genus of moths

Agyrtiola is a genus of moths in the subfamily Arctiinae. It contains the single species Agyrtiola niepelti, which is found in Brazil.
