= Parascepsis =

Scientific classification
- Domain: Eukaryota
- Kingdom: Animalia
- Phylum: Arthropoda
- Class: Insecta
- Order: Lepidoptera
- Superfamily: Noctuoidea
- Family: Erebidae
- Subfamily: Arctiinae
- Genus: Parascepsis; Dognin, 1923
- Species: P. solox

Binomial name
- Parascepsis solox Dognin, 1923

Genus of moths

Parascepsis is a genus of moths in the subfamily Arctiinae. It contains the single species Parascepsis solox, which is found in the Amazon region.
