= Sphecops =

Scientific classification
- Kingdom: Animalia
- Phylum: Arthropoda
- Class: Insecta
- Order: Lepidoptera
- Superfamily: Noctuoidea
- Family: Erebidae
- Subfamily: Arctiinae
- Genus: Sphecops; Orfila, 1935
- Species: S. arctata

Binomial name
- Sphecops arctata (Walker, 1864)

Synonyms
- Pseudosphex arctata Walker, 1864

Genus of moths

Sphecops is a monotypic moth genus in the subfamily Arctiinae described by Orfila in 1935. Its single species, Sphecops arctata, was first described by Francis Walker in 1864. It is found in Brazil.
