= Pompilopsis =

Scientific classification
- Kingdom: Animalia
- Phylum: Arthropoda
- Class: Insecta
- Order: Lepidoptera
- Superfamily: Noctuoidea
- Family: Erebidae
- Subfamily: Arctiinae
- Genus: Pompilopsis; Hampson, 1898
- Species: P. tarsalis

Binomial name
- Pompilopsis tarsalis (Walker, 1854)

Synonyms
- Glaucopis tarsalis Walker, 1854; Glaucopis semihyalina Walker, 1854; Myrmecopsis semihyalina; Pseudosphex vespiformis Herrich-Schäffer, [1855]

Genus of moths

Pompilopsis is a monotypic moth genus in the subfamily Arctiinae erected by George Hampson in 1898. Its single species, Pompilopsis tarsalis, was first described by Francis Walker in 1854. It is found in Mexico, Guatemala and Pará, Brazil. It is recombined as Sphecosoma tarsalis (Walker, 1854) in Simmons & Weller, 2004 [2006], & Simmons, 2004.
