= Oreoceryx =

Scientific classification
- Kingdom: Animalia
- Phylum: Arthropoda
- Class: Insecta
- Order: Lepidoptera
- Superfamily: Noctuoidea
- Family: Erebidae
- Subfamily: Arctiinae
- Genus: Oreoceryx; Kiriakoff, 1953
- Species: O. aenea

Binomial name
- Oreoceryx aenea Kiriakoff, 1953

Genus of moths

Oreoceryx is a genus of moths in the subfamily Arctiinae. It contains the single species Oreoceryx aenea, which is found in the Democratic Republic of Congo.
