= Paraplesis =

Scientific classification
- Domain: Eukaryota
- Kingdom: Animalia
- Phylum: Arthropoda
- Class: Insecta
- Order: Lepidoptera
- Superfamily: Noctuoidea
- Family: Erebidae
- Subfamily: Arctiinae
- Genus: Paraplesis; Herrich-Schäffer, 1855
- Species: P. collaris

Binomial name
- Paraplesis collaris Herrich-Schäffer, 1855

Genus of moths

Paraplesis is a genus of moths in the subfamily Arctiinae. It contains the single species Paraplesis collaris, which is found in Brazil.
