= Tigridania =

Scientific classification
- Domain: Eukaryota
- Kingdom: Animalia
- Phylum: Arthropoda
- Class: Insecta
- Order: Lepidoptera
- Superfamily: Noctuoidea
- Family: Erebidae
- Subfamily: Arctiinae
- Genus: Tigridania; Kaye, 1918
- Species: T. quadricincta

Binomial name
- Tigridania quadricincta Kaye, 1918

Genus of moths

Tigridania is a genus of moths in the subfamily Arctiinae. It contains two species Tigridania quadricincta, which is found in Peru and Tigridania magdalenae, which is found in Colombia.
