= Neotrichura =

Scientific classification
- Domain: Eukaryota
- Kingdom: Animalia
- Phylum: Arthropoda
- Class: Insecta
- Order: Lepidoptera
- Superfamily: Noctuoidea
- Family: Erebidae
- Subfamily: Arctiinae
- Genus: Neotrichura; H. Druce, 1896
- Species: N. nigripes

Binomial name
- Neotrichura nigripes (Heylaerts, 1890)

Synonyms
- Laemocharis nigripes Heylaerts, 1890; Cosmosoma dukinfieldia Schaus, 1896; Neotrichura penates H. Druce, 1896

Genus of moths

Neotrichura is a monotypic moth genus in the subfamily Arctiinae erected by Herbert Druce in 1896. Its single species, Neotrichura nigripes, was first described by Franciscus J. M. Heylaerts in 1890. It is found in Panama and the Brazilian states of Paraná and Rio de Janeiro.
