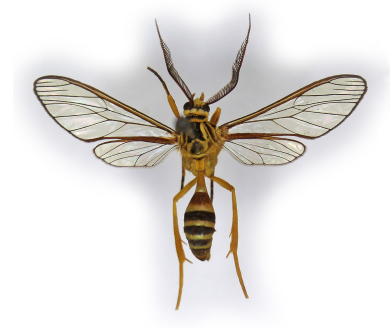
- Pleurosoma Trinitatis

Scientific classification
- Kingdom: Animalia
- Phylum: Arthropoda
- Class: Insecta
- Order: Lepidoptera
- Superfamily: Noctuoidea
- Family: Erebidae
- Subfamily: Arctiinae
- Genus: Pleurosoma; Orfila, 1935

Synonyms
- Astridia Kiriakoff, 1948

= Pleurosoma =

Genus and species of moth

Pleurosoma is a genus in the moth subfamily Arctiinae described by Orfila in 1935.

== Species ==
- Pleurosoma angustata (Möschler, 1878) Guatemala, Panama, Suriname and Venezuela.
- Pleurosoma perconstrictum (Zerny, 1912) Brazil
