= Hoppiana =

Scientific classification
- Domain: Eukaryota
- Kingdom: Animalia
- Phylum: Arthropoda
- Class: Insecta
- Order: Lepidoptera
- Superfamily: Noctuoidea
- Family: Erebidae
- Subfamily: Arctiinae
- Genus: Hoppiana; Hering, 1925
- Species: H. aspasta

Binomial name
- Hoppiana aspasta Hering & Hopp, 1925

Genus of moths

Hoppiana is a genus of moths in the subfamily Arctiinae. It contains the single species Hoppiana aspasta, which is found in Colombia.
