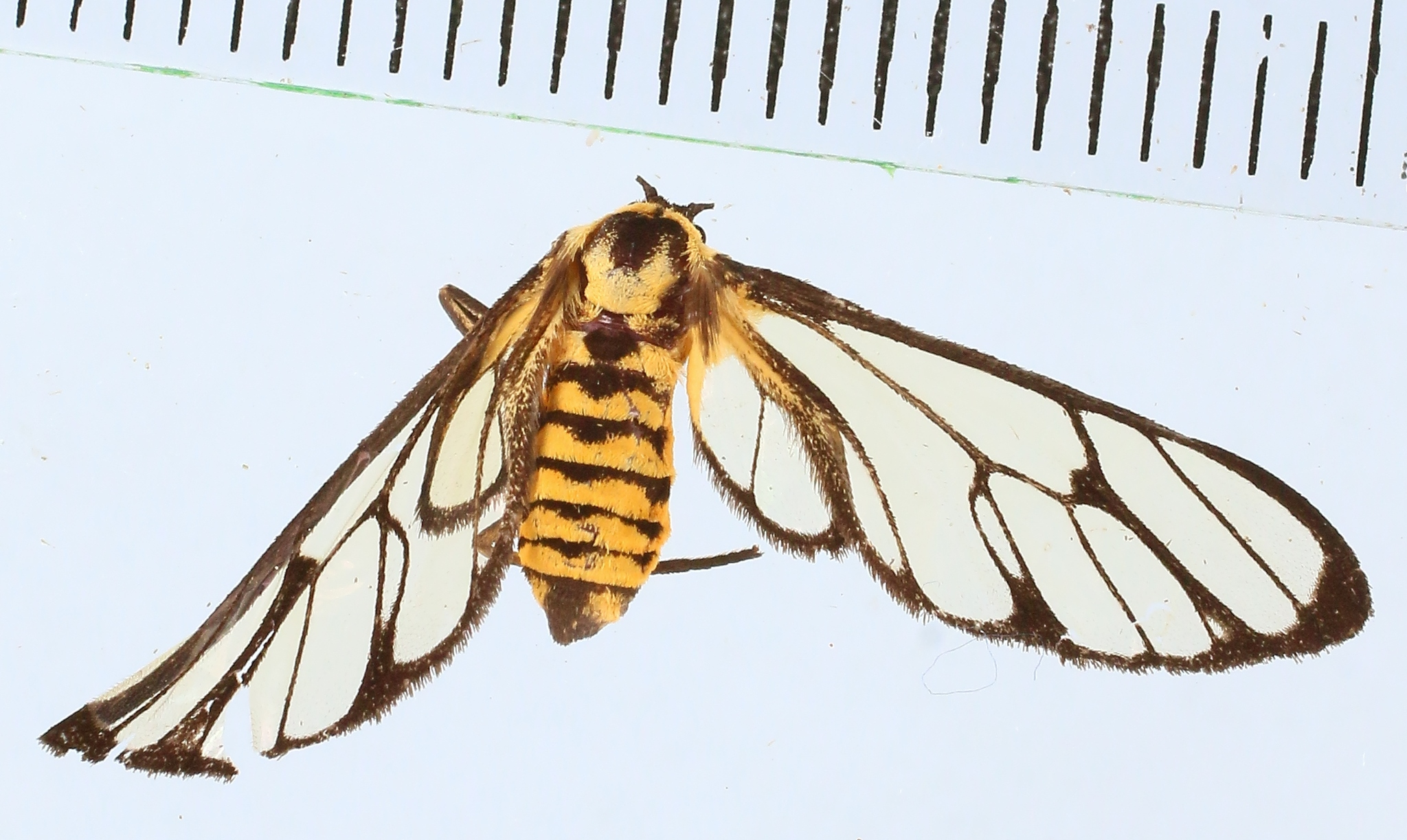

Scientific classification
- Kingdom: Animalia
- Phylum: Arthropoda
- Class: Insecta
- Order: Lepidoptera
- Superfamily: Noctuoidea
- Family: Erebidae
- Subfamily: Arctiinae
- Genus: Paralaethia; Hampson, 1907
- Species: P. subformicina

Binomial name
- Paralaethia subformicina (Bethune-Baker, 1904)

Synonyms
- Ceryx subformicina Bethune-Baker, 1904

= Paralaethia =

Paralaethia subformicina

Genus of moths

Paealaethia is a monotypic moth genus in the subfamily Arctiinae erected by George Hampson in 1907. Its single species, Paralaethia subformicina, was first described by George Thomas Bethune-Baker in 1904. It is found in New Guinea.
