= Phaeosphecia =

Scientific classification
- Kingdom: Animalia
- Phylum: Arthropoda
- Class: Insecta
- Order: Lepidoptera
- Superfamily: Noctuoidea
- Family: Erebidae
- Subfamily: Arctiinae
- Genus: Phaeosphecia; Hampson, 1898
- Species: P. opaca

Binomial name
- Phaeosphecia opaca (Walker, 1856)

Synonyms
- Myrmecopsis opaca Walker, 1856; Pseudsphex vespa Herrich-Schäffer, [1856]

Genus of moths

Phaeosphecia is a monotypic moth genus in the subfamily Arctiinae erected by George Hampson in 1856. Its single species, Phaeosphecia opaca, described by Francis Walker in 1856, is found in Pará, Brazil.
