= Paradinia =

Scientific classification
- Domain: Eukaryota
- Kingdom: Animalia
- Phylum: Arthropoda
- Class: Insecta
- Order: Lepidoptera
- Superfamily: Noctuoidea
- Family: Erebidae
- Subfamily: Arctiinae
- Genus: Paradinia; Draudt, 1915
- Species: P. chrysogastrides

Binomial name
- Paradinia chrysogastrides Draudt, 1915

Genus of moths

Paradinia is a genus of moths in the subfamily Arctiinae. It contains the single species Paradinia chrysogastrides, which is found in Colombia.
