= Anaphlebia =

Scientific classification
- Domain: Eukaryota
- Kingdom: Animalia
- Phylum: Arthropoda
- Class: Insecta
- Order: Lepidoptera
- Superfamily: Noctuoidea
- Family: Erebidae
- Subfamily: Arctiinae
- Genus: Anaphlebia; Felder, 1874
- Species: A. caudatula

Binomial name
- Anaphlebia caudatula Felder, 1874

Genus of moths

Anaphlebia is a monotypic moth genus in the subfamily Arctiinae. Its single species, Anaphlebia caudatula, is found in the Amazon region. Both the genus and species were first described by Felder in 1874.
