= Ceramidiodes =

Scientific classification
- Domain: Eukaryota
- Kingdom: Animalia
- Phylum: Arthropoda
- Class: Insecta
- Order: Lepidoptera
- Superfamily: Noctuoidea
- Family: Erebidae
- Subfamily: Arctiinae
- Genus: Ceramidiodes; Hampson, 1914
- Species: C. obscurus

Binomial name
- Ceramidiodes obscurus (Butler, 1877)

Synonyms
- Ceramidia obscurus Butler, 1877; Ceramidia obscura; Ceramidia mathani Rothschild, 1912

Genus of moths

Ceramidiodes is a genus of moths in the subfamily Arctiinae. It contains the single species Ceramidiodes obscurus. It is found in Brazil.
