= Pseudosphecosoma =

Scientific classification
- Domain: Eukaryota
- Kingdom: Animalia
- Phylum: Arthropoda
- Class: Insecta
- Order: Lepidoptera
- Superfamily: Noctuoidea
- Family: Erebidae
- Subfamily: Arctiinae
- Genus: Pseudosphecosoma; Strand, 1915
- Species: P. vespoides

Binomial name
- Pseudosphecosoma vespoides Strand, 1915

Genus of moths

Pseudosphecosoma is a genus of moths in the subfamily Arctiinae. It contains the single species Pseudosphecosoma vespoides, which is found in Brazil.
