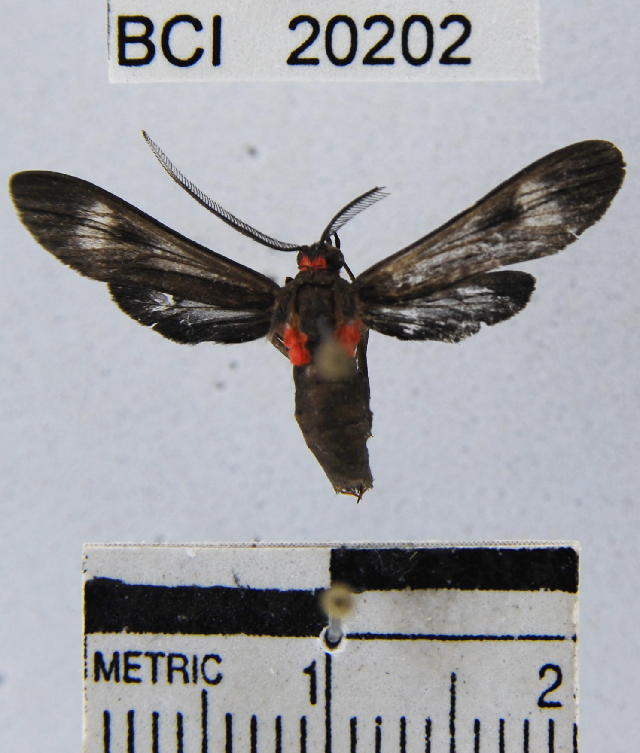
- Hypocladia restricta

Scientific classification
- Domain: Eukaryota
- Kingdom: Animalia
- Phylum: Arthropoda
- Class: Insecta
- Order: Lepidoptera
- Superfamily: Noctuoidea
- Family: Erebidae
- Subfamily: Arctiinae
- Genus: Hypocladia; Hampson, 1898

= Hypocladia =

Genus of moths

Hypocladia is a genus of moths in the subfamily Arctiinae erected by George Hampson in 1898.

== Species ==
- Hypocladia calita Dognin, 1911
- Hypocladia elongata Druce, 1905
- Hypocladia militaris Butler, 1877
- Hypocladia parcipuncta Hampson, 1909
- Hypocladia restricta Hampson, 1901
