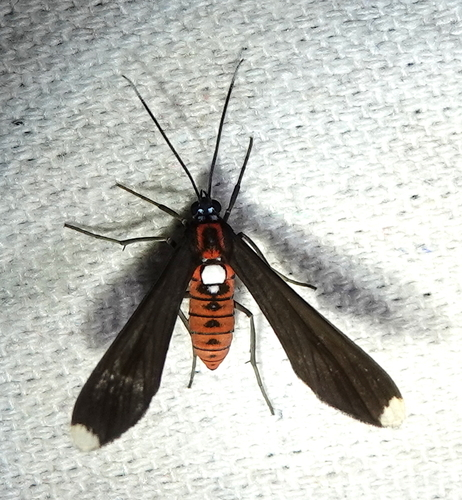

Scientific classification
- Domain: Eukaryota
- Kingdom: Animalia
- Phylum: Arthropoda
- Class: Insecta
- Order: Lepidoptera
- Superfamily: Noctuoidea
- Family: Erebidae
- Subfamily: Arctiinae
- Tribe: Arctiini
- Genus: Horamella; Draudt, 1915
- Species: H. fassli

Binomial name
- Horamella fassli Draudt, 1915

= Horamella =

Genus of moths

Horamella is a genus of moths in the subfamily Arctiinae. It contains the single species Horamella fassli, which is found in Colombia.
