= Lepidoneiva =

Scientific classification
- Domain: Eukaryota
- Kingdom: Animalia
- Phylum: Arthropoda
- Class: Insecta
- Order: Lepidoptera
- Superfamily: Noctuoidea
- Family: Erebidae
- Subfamily: Arctiinae
- Genus: Lepidoneiva; Travassos, 1940
- Species: L. erubescens

Binomial name
- Lepidoneiva erubescens (Butler, 1876)

Synonyms
- Cosmosoma erubescens Butler, 1876; Cosmosoma teuthras erubescens

Genus of moths

Lepidoneiva is a genus of moths in the subfamily Arctiinae. It contains the single species Lepidoneiva erubescens, which is found in Brazil (São Paulo).
