= Phoeniostacta =

Scientific classification
- Kingdom: Animalia
- Phylum: Arthropoda
- Class: Insecta
- Order: Lepidoptera
- Superfamily: Noctuoidea
- Family: Erebidae
- Subfamily: Arctiinae
- Genus: Phoeniostacta; Hampson, 1898
- Species: P. haematobasis

Binomial name
- Phoeniostacta haematobasis Hampson, 1898

Genus of moths

Phoeniostacta is a monotypic moth genus in the subfamily Arctiinae. Its single species, Phoeniostacta haematobasis, is found in Santa Catarina, Brazil. Both the genus and species were first described by George Hampson in 1898.
