= Osmocneme =

Scientific classification
- Domain: Eukaryota
- Kingdom: Animalia
- Phylum: Arthropoda
- Class: Insecta
- Order: Lepidoptera
- Superfamily: Noctuoidea
- Family: Erebidae
- Subfamily: Arctiinae
- Genus: Osmocneme; Draudt, 1917
- Species: O. bracata

Binomial name
- Osmocneme bracata Draudt, 1917

Genus of moths

Osmocneme is a genus of moths in the subfamily Arctiinae. It contains the single species Osmocneme bracata, which is found in Colombia.
