= Apocerea =

Scientific classification
- Kingdom: Animalia
- Phylum: Arthropoda
- Class: Insecta
- Order: Lepidoptera
- Superfamily: Noctuoidea
- Family: Erebidae
- Subfamily: Arctiinae
- Genus: Apocerea; Dyar, 1905
- Species: A. sobria

Binomial name
- Apocerea sobria Schaus, 1905

Genus of moths

Apocerea is a genus of moths in the subfamily Arctiinae described by Harrison Gray Dyar Jr. in 1905. It contains the species Apocerea sobria, described by William Schaus in 1905, which is found in French Guiana.
