= Disasuridia =

Scientific classification
- Kingdom: Animalia
- Phylum: Arthropoda
- Clade: Pancrustacea
- Class: Insecta
- Order: Lepidoptera
- Superfamily: Noctuoidea
- Family: Erebidae
- Subfamily: Arctiinae
- Genus: Disasuridia; Fang, 1991

Genus of moths

Disasuridia is a genus of moths in the subfamily Arctiinae. The genus was erected by Cheng-Lai Fang in 1991.

== Species ==
- Disasuridia conferta Fang, 1991 Guangdong
- Disasuridia confusa Fang, 1991 Guangxi
- Disasuridia fangae Kirti, Joshi & Singh, 2013 India
- Disasuridia flava Fang, 1991 Xizang
- Disasuridia rubida Fang, 1991 Yunnan
- Disasuridia virgula Fang, 1991 Guangxi
