= Paraplastis =

Scientific classification
- Kingdom: Animalia
- Phylum: Arthropoda
- Class: Insecta
- Order: Lepidoptera
- Superfamily: Noctuoidea
- Family: Erebidae
- Subfamily: Arctiinae
- Tribe: Arctiini
- Genus: Paraplastis; Hampson, 1901
- Species: P. hampsoni

Binomial name
- Paraplastis hampsoni (Swinhoe, 1889)

Synonyms
- Migoplastis hampsoni Swinhoe, 1889

Genus of moths

Paraplastis is a monotypic moth genus in the subfamily Arctiinae erected by George Hampson in 1901. Its single species, Paraplastis hampsoni, was first described by Swinhoe in 1889. It is found in India.
