= Enope =

Scientific classification
- Kingdom: Animalia
- Phylum: Arthropoda
- Class: Insecta
- Order: Lepidoptera
- Superfamily: Noctuoidea
- Family: Erebidae
- Subfamily: Arctiinae
- Genus: Enope; Walker, 1854
- Species: E. tolumnensis

Binomial name
- Enope tolumnensis (Herrich-Schäffer, 1853)

Synonyms
- Trichela Herrich-Schäffer, 1853; Glaucopis tolumnensis Herrich-Schäffer, 1853; Euchromia hirsuta Walker, 1854

Genus of moths

Enope is a genus of moths in the subfamily Arctiinae. It contains the single species Enope tolumnensis, which is found in Colombia.
