= Zellatilla =

Scientific classification
- Kingdom: Animalia
- Phylum: Arthropoda
- Class: Insecta
- Order: Lepidoptera
- Superfamily: Noctuoidea
- Family: Erebidae
- Subfamily: Arctiinae
- Genus: Zellatilla; Dyar, 1914
- Species: Z. columbia

Binomial name
- Zellatilla columbia Dyar, 1914

Genus of moths

Zellatilla is a genus of moths in the subfamily Arctiinae. It contains the single species Zellatilla columbia, which is found in Colombia and on Cuba.
