= Amatula =

Scientific classification
- Kingdom: Animalia
- Phylum: Arthropoda
- Class: Insecta
- Order: Lepidoptera
- Superfamily: Noctuoidea
- Family: Erebidae
- Subfamily: Arctiinae
- Genus: Amatula; Wiltshire, 1983
- Species: A. kikiae

Binomial name
- Amatula kikiae Wiltshire, 1983

Genus of moths

Amatula is a genus of moths in the subfamily Arctiinae. It contains only one species, Amatula kikiae, which is found in Yemen.
