= Midara =

Scientific classification
- Kingdom: Animalia
- Phylum: Arthropoda
- Clade: Pancrustacea
- Class: Insecta
- Order: Lepidoptera
- Superfamily: Noctuoidea
- Family: Erebidae
- Subfamily: Arctiinae
- Genus: Midara; Schaus, 1928

Genus of moths

Midara is a genus of moths in the subfamily Arctiinae.

== Species ==
- Midara balbalasanga Schaus, 1928
- Midara bengueta Schaus, 1928
