= Magnoptera =

Scientific classification
- Kingdom: Animalia
- Phylum: Arthropoda
- Class: Insecta
- Order: Lepidoptera
- Superfamily: Noctuoidea
- Family: Erebidae
- Subfamily: Arctiinae
- Genus: Magnoptera; Ruiz-Rodriguez, 1989
- Species: M. watsoni

Binomial name
- Magnoptera watsoni (Ruiz-Rodriguez, 1989)

Synonyms
- Chilesia watsoni Ruiz-Rodriguez, 1989

Genus of moths

Magnoptera is a genus of moths in the subfamily Arctiinae. It contains the single species Magnoptera watsoni, which is found in Chile.
