= Nannoceryx =

Scientific classification
- Domain: Eukaryota
- Kingdom: Animalia
- Phylum: Arthropoda
- Class: Insecta
- Order: Lepidoptera
- Superfamily: Noctuoidea
- Family: Erebidae
- Subfamily: Arctiinae
- Genus: Nannoceryx; Roepke, 1937
- Species: N. myiella

Binomial name
- Nannoceryx myiella (van Eecke, 1920)

Synonyms
- Eressa myiella van Eecke, 1920

Genus of moths

Nannoceryx is a genus of moths in the subfamily Arctiinae. It contains the single species Nannoceryx myiella, which is found on Java.
