= Gangamela =

Scientific classification
- Kingdom: Animalia
- Phylum: Arthropoda
- Class: Insecta
- Order: Lepidoptera
- Superfamily: Noctuoidea
- Family: Erebidae
- Subfamily: Arctiinae
- Genus: Gangamela; Walker, [1865]

Synonyms
- Uxela Walker, 1866

Genus of moths

Gangamela is a genus of moths in the subfamily Arctiinae erected by Francis Walker in 1865.

== Species ==
- Gangamela ira Druce, 1896
- Gangamela saturata Walker, 1864
