= Hypocharis =

Scientific classification
- Kingdom: Animalia
- Phylum: Arthropoda
- Clade: Pancrustacea
- Class: Insecta
- Order: Lepidoptera
- Superfamily: Noctuoidea
- Family: Erebidae
- Subfamily: Arctiinae
- Genus: Hypocharis; Hampson, 1898
- Species: H. clusia

Binomial name
- Hypocharis clusia (H. Druce, 1897)

Synonyms
- Laemocharis clusia H. Druce, 1897; Hyperphara clusia H. Druce, 1897

Genus of moths

Hypocharis is a monotypic moth genus in the family Arctiidae erected by George Hampson in 1898. Its single species, Hypocharis clusia, was first described by Herbert Druce in 1897. It is found in the Amazon region.
