= Quadrasura =

Scientific classification
- Kingdom: Animalia
- Phylum: Arthropoda
- Clade: Pancrustacea
- Class: Insecta
- Order: Lepidoptera
- Superfamily: Noctuoidea
- Family: Erebidae
- Subfamily: Arctiinae
- Genus: Quadrasura; Holloway, 2001
- Species: Q. ktimuna

Binomial name
- Quadrasura ktimuna (van Eecke, 1920)

Synonyms
- Asura ktimuna van Eecke, 1920

Genus of moths

Quadrasura is a monotypic moth genus in the subfamily Arctiinae erected by Jeremy Daniel Holloway in 2001. Its only species, Quadrasura ktimuna, was originally placed in the genus Asura by Rudolf van Eecke in 1920. The species is found in Borneo. The species is only known from the two original specimens from Kalimantan. The type locality is Smitau, inland from Singkawang which is on the coast of western Kalimantan north of Pontianak.
