= Phaenarete (moth) =

Scientific classification
- Kingdom: Animalia
- Phylum: Arthropoda
- Class: Insecta
- Order: Lepidoptera
- Superfamily: Noctuoidea
- Family: Erebidae
- Subfamily: Arctiinae
- Genus: Phaenarete; H. Druce, 1896
- Species: P. diana

Binomial name
- Phaenarete diana H. Druce, 1896

Genus of moths

Phaenarete is a monotypic moth genus in the subfamily Arctiinae. Its single species, Phaenarete diana, is found in Panama and Costa Rica. Both the genus and species were first described by Herbert Druce in 1896.
