= Diaxanthia =

Scientific classification
- Kingdom: Animalia
- Phylum: Arthropoda
- Class: Insecta
- Order: Lepidoptera
- Superfamily: Noctuoidea
- Family: Erebidae
- Subfamily: Arctiinae
- Genus: Diaxanthia; Hampson, 1898
- Species: D. lucinia

Binomial name
- Diaxanthia lucinia (H. Druce, 1884)

Synonyms
- Automolis lucinia H. Druce, 1884

Genus of moths

Diaxanthia is a monotypic moth genus in the subfamily Arctiinae erected by George Hampson in 1898. Its single species, Diaxanthia lucinia, was first described by Herbert Druce in 1884. It is found in Costa Rica.
