= Arctiites =

Scientific classification
- Kingdom: Animalia
- Phylum: Arthropoda
- Class: Insecta
- Order: Lepidoptera
- Superfamily: Noctuoidea
- Family: Erebidae
- Subfamily: Arctiinae
- Genus: †Arctiites; Rebel 1898
- Species: †A. deletus

Binomial name
- †Arctiites deletus Rebel, 1898

Single-species extinct genus of moths

Arctiites is an extinct monotypic moth genus in the subfamily Arctiinae. Its only species is Arctiites deletus. Both the genus and the species were described by Hans Rebel in 1889. The species was described from Gabbro near Pisa in Italy. It is dated to the Miocene.
