= Sauritinia =

Scientific classification
- Kingdom: Animalia
- Phylum: Arthropoda
- Class: Insecta
- Order: Lepidoptera
- Superfamily: Noctuoidea
- Family: Erebidae
- Subfamily: Arctiinae
- Genus: Sauritinia; Dyar, 1905
- Species: S. dubiosa

Binomial name
- Sauritinia dubiosa Schaus, 1905

Genus of moths

Sauritinia is a genus of moths in the subfamily Arctiinae. It contains the single species Sauritinia dubiosa, which is found in French Guiana.
