= Sesiura =

Scientific classification
- Kingdom: Animalia
- Phylum: Arthropoda
- Class: Insecta
- Order: Lepidoptera
- Superfamily: Noctuoidea
- Family: Erebidae
- Subfamily: Arctiinae
- Genus: Sesiura; Hampson, 1898
- Species: S. vespoides

Binomial name
- Sesiura vespoides (Walker, [1865])

Synonyms
- Eunomia smaragdina Walker, [1865]; Aethria saturatissima Walker, [1865]

Genus of moths

Sesiura is a monotypic moth genus in the subfamily Arctiinae erected by George Hampson in 1898. Its single species, Sesiura smaragdina, was first described by Francis Walker in 1865. It is found in French Guiana and Brazil (Tefé).
