= Urolosia =

Scientific classification
- Domain: Eukaryota
- Kingdom: Animalia
- Phylum: Arthropoda
- Class: Insecta
- Order: Lepidoptera
- Superfamily: Noctuoidea
- Family: Erebidae
- Subfamily: Arctiinae
- Genus: Urolosia; H. Druce, 1898

Synonyms
- Urolasia Hampson, 1898

Genus of moths

Urolosia is a genus of moths in the subfamily Arctiinae. The genus was erected by Herbert Druce in 1898.

== Species ==
- Urolosia albipuncta Druce, 1905
- Urolosia brodea Schaus, 1896
- Urolosia opalocincta Druce, 1898
