= Grammarctia =

Scientific classification
- Kingdom: Animalia
- Phylum: Arthropoda
- Class: Insecta
- Order: Lepidoptera
- Superfamily: Noctuoidea
- Family: Erebidae
- Subfamily: Arctiinae
- Genus: Grammarctia; Aurivillius, 1900
- Species: G. bilinea

Binomial name
- Grammarctia bilinea (Walker, [1865])

Synonyms
- Setina bilinea Walker, [1865]

Genus of moths

Grammarctia is a monotypic moth genus in the family Noctuidae erected by Per Olof Christopher Aurivillius in 1900. Its single species, Grammarctia bilinea, was first described by Francis Walker in 1865. It is found in Lesotho, Mozambique, South Africa and Zimbabwe.
