= Loxozona =

Scientific classification
- Domain: Eukaryota
- Kingdom: Animalia
- Phylum: Arthropoda
- Class: Insecta
- Order: Lepidoptera
- Superfamily: Noctuoidea
- Family: Erebidae
- Subfamily: Arctiinae
- Genus: Loxozona; Hampson, 1898

Genus of moths

Loxozona is a genus of moths in the subfamily Arctiinae. The genus was erected by George Hampson in 1898. It occurs in South America.

== Species ==
There are two accepted species:

- Loxozona lanceolata Walker, 1854
- Loxozona nitens Rothschild, 1912
