= Patreliura =

Scientific classification
- Domain: Eukaryota
- Kingdom: Animalia
- Phylum: Arthropoda
- Class: Insecta
- Order: Lepidoptera
- Superfamily: Noctuoidea
- Family: Erebidae
- Subfamily: Arctiinae
- Genus: Patreliura; Hampson, 1898
- Species: P. capys

Binomial name
- Patreliura capys (Cramer, [1775])

Synonyms
- Sphinx capys Cramer, [1775]; Heliura lacteinota Butler, 1876

Genus of moths

Patreliura is a monotypic moth genus in the subfamily Arctiinae erected by George Hampson in 1898. Its single species, Patreliura capys, was first described by Pieter Cramer in 1775. It is found in Guyana, Suriname and Brazil (Tefé).
