= Zigira =

Scientific classification
- Kingdom: Animalia
- Phylum: Arthropoda
- Class: Insecta
- Order: Lepidoptera
- Superfamily: Noctuoidea
- Family: Erebidae
- Subfamily: Arctiinae
- Genus: Zigira; Walker, 1865
- Species: Z. quadrata

Binomial name
- Zigira quadrata Walker, 1865

Genus of moths

Zigira is a genus of moths in the subfamily Arctiinae. It was first described by Francis Walker in 1865. It contains the single species Zigira quadrata, which is found in Colombia.
