= Agyrtidia =

Scientific classification
- Kingdom: Animalia
- Phylum: Arthropoda
- Class: Insecta
- Order: Lepidoptera
- Superfamily: Noctuoidea
- Family: Erebidae
- Subfamily: Arctiinae
- Genus: Agyrtidia; Hampson, 1898

Erebid moth genus

Agyrtidia is a genus of moths in the subfamily Arctiinae.

== Species ==
- Agyrtidia olivensis Filho & do Régo Barros, 1970
- Agyrtidia uranophila Walker, 1866
