= Procalypta =

Scientific classification
- Kingdom: Animalia
- Phylum: Arthropoda
- Class: Insecta
- Order: Lepidoptera
- Superfamily: Noctuoidea
- Family: Erebidae
- Subfamily: Arctiinae
- Genus: Procalypta; Butler, 1876
- Species: P. subcyanea

Binomial name
- Procalypta subcyanea (Walker, 1854)

Synonyms
- Euchromia subcyanea Walker, 1854; Procalypta victorina Druce, 1884

Genus of moths

Procalypta is a monotypic moth genus in the subfamily Arctiinae erected by Arthur Gardiner Butler in 1876. Is single species, Procalypta subcyanea, was first described by Francis Walker in 1854. It is found in Mexico, Costa Rica and Panama.

== Subspecies ==
- Procalypta subcyanea subcyanea
- Procalypta subcyanea victorina Druce, 1884 (Costa Rica, Panama)
