= Abnormipterus =

Scientific classification
- Kingdom: Animalia
- Phylum: Arthropoda
- Class: Insecta
- Order: Lepidoptera
- Superfamily: Noctuoidea
- Family: Erebidae
- Subfamily: Arctiinae
- Genus: Abnormipterus; Orfila, 1935
- Species: A. abnormis

Binomial name
- Abnormipterus abnormis (Hampson, 1898)

Genus of moths

Abnormipterus is a monotypic moth genus in the erebid subfamily Arctiinae described by Orfila in 1935. Its single species, Abnormipterus abnormis, was first described by George Hampson in 1898. It is found in the lower Amazon River basin.
