= Paramyopsyche =

Scientific classification
- Kingdom: Animalia
- Phylum: Arthropoda
- Class: Insecta
- Order: Lepidoptera
- Superfamily: Noctuoidea
- Family: Erebidae
- Subfamily: Arctiinae
- Genus: Paramyopsyche; Debauche, 1942
- Species: P. wittei

Binomial name
- Paramyopsyche wittei Debauche, 1942

Genus of insects

Paramyopsyche is a genus of moths in the subfamily Arctiinae. It contains the single species Paramyopsyche wittei, which is found in the Democratic Republic of Congo.
