= Prytania =

Scientific classification
- Domain: Eukaryota
- Kingdom: Animalia
- Phylum: Arthropoda
- Class: Insecta
- Order: Lepidoptera
- Superfamily: Noctuoidea
- Family: Erebidae
- Subfamily: Arctiinae
- Genus: Prytania; Debauche, 1938
- Species: P. straeleni

Binomial name
- Prytania straeleni Debauche, 1938

Genus of moths

Prytania is a genus of moths in the subfamily Arctiinae. It contains the single species Prytania straeleni, which is found in Brazil.
