= Micragyrta =

Scientific classification
- Kingdom: Animalia
- Phylum: Arthropoda
- Class: Insecta
- Order: Lepidoptera
- Superfamily: Noctuoidea
- Family: Erebidae
- Subfamily: Arctiinae
- Genus: Micragyrta; Butler, 1876
- Species: M. diminuta

Binomial name
- Micragyrta diminuta (Walker, 1854)

Synonyms
- Dioptis diminuta Walker, 1854; Agyrta gavisa Walker, [1865]

Genus of moths

Micragyrta is a monotypic moth genus in the subfamily Arctiinae erected by Arthur Gardiner Butler in 1876. Its single species, Micragyrta diminuta, was first described by Francis Walker in 1854. It is found in Brazil (Tefé, Pará).
