= Pseudophaio =

Scientific classification
- Kingdom: Animalia
- Phylum: Arthropoda
- Class: Insecta
- Order: Lepidoptera
- Superfamily: Noctuoidea
- Family: Erebidae
- Subfamily: Arctiinae
- Genus: Pseudophaio; Hampson, 1914
- Species: P. rosenbergi

Binomial name
- Pseudophaio rosenbergi (Rothschild, 1911)

Synonyms
- Poliopasta rosenbergi Rothschild, 1911

Genus of moths

Pseudophaio is a monotypic moth genus in the subfamily Arctiinae erected by George Hampson in his 1914 Catalogue of the Amatidae and Arctiadae (Nolinae and Lithosianae) in the collection of the British Museum. Its single species, Pseudophaio rosenbergi, was first described by Rothschild in 1911, in volume 18 of Novitates Zoologicae. It is found in Ecuador.

Its single species, Pseudophaio rosenbergi, was first described by Walter Rothschild (1868–1937) in 1911. Rothschild was a British zoologist who assembled one of the largest private natural history collections ever created.
