= Romualdisca =

Scientific classification
- Domain: Eukaryota
- Kingdom: Animalia
- Phylum: Arthropoda
- Class: Insecta
- Order: Lepidoptera
- Superfamily: Noctuoidea
- Family: Erebidae
- Subfamily: Arctiinae
- Genus: Romualdisca; Andretta & Travassos, 1946
- Species: R. dalmeidai

Binomial name
- Romualdisca dalmeidai Andretta & Travassos, 1946

Genus of moths

Romualdisca is a genus of moths in the subfamily Arctiinae. It contains the single species Romualdisca dalmeidai, which is found in Brazil.
