= Pseudaethria =

Scientific classification
- Domain: Eukaryota
- Kingdom: Animalia
- Phylum: Arthropoda
- Class: Insecta
- Order: Lepidoptera
- Superfamily: Noctuoidea
- Family: Erebidae
- Subfamily: Arctiinae
- Genus: Pseudaethria; Schaus, 1924
- Species: P. cessogae

Binomial name
- Pseudaethria cessogae Schaus, 1924

Genus of moths

Pseudaethria is a genus of moths in the subfamily Arctiinae. It contains the single species Pseudaethria cessogae, which is found in Brazil.
