= Homoneuronia =

Scientific classification
- Kingdom: Animalia
- Phylum: Arthropoda
- Class: Insecta
- Order: Lepidoptera
- Superfamily: Noctuoidea
- Family: Erebidae
- Subfamily: Arctiinae
- Genus: Homoneuronia; Dyar, 1905
- Species: H. modesta

Binomial name
- Homoneuronia modesta Schaus, 1905

Genus of moths

Homoneuronia is a genus of moths in the subfamily Arctiinae. It contains the single species Homoneuronia modesta, which is found in French Guiana.
