= Pseudoceryx =

Scientific classification
- Domain: Eukaryota
- Kingdom: Animalia
- Phylum: Arthropoda
- Class: Insecta
- Order: Lepidoptera
- Superfamily: Noctuoidea
- Family: Erebidae
- Subfamily: Arctiinae
- Genus: Pseudoceryx; Rothschild, 1910
- Species: P. dohertyi

Binomial name
- Pseudoceryx dohertyi Rothschild, 1910

Genus of moths

Pseudoceryx is a monotypic moth genus in the subfamily Arctiinae. Its single species, Pseudoceryx dohertyi, is found in New Guinea. Both the genus and species were first described by Rothschild in 1910.
