= Epanycles =

Scientific classification
- Kingdom: Animalia
- Phylum: Arthropoda
- Class: Insecta
- Order: Lepidoptera
- Superfamily: Noctuoidea
- Family: Erebidae
- Subfamily: Arctiinae
- Genus: Epanycles; Butler, 1876
- Species: E. imperialis

Binomial name
- Epanycles imperialis (Walker, 1854)

Synonyms
- Euchromia imperialis Walker, 1854

Genus of moths

Epanycles is a monotypic moth genus in the subfamily Arctiinae. Its single species, Epanycles imperialis, is found in Costa Rica, Guatemala and the Amazon region. The species was first described in 1854 as Euchromia imperialis, and the genus was first described by Arthur Gardiner Butler in 1876.
