= Metacrocea =

Scientific classification
- Kingdom: Animalia
- Phylum: Arthropoda
- Class: Insecta
- Order: Lepidoptera
- Superfamily: Noctuoidea
- Family: Erebidae
- Subfamily: Arctiinae
- Genus: Metacrocea; Dyar, 1905
- Species: M. postflava

Binomial name
- Metacrocea postflava Schaus, 1905

Genus of moths

Metacrocea is a genus of moths in the subfamily Arctiinae. It contains the single species Metacrocea postflava, which is found in Costa Rica and Brazil.
