= Toulgoetinaclia =

Scientific classification
- Domain: Eukaryota
- Kingdom: Animalia
- Phylum: Arthropoda
- Class: Insecta
- Order: Lepidoptera
- Superfamily: Noctuoidea
- Family: Erebidae
- Subfamily: Arctiinae
- Genus: Toulgoetinaclia; Griveaud, 1964
- Species: T. obliquipuncta

Binomial name
- Toulgoetinaclia obliquipuncta (Rothschild, 1924)

Synonyms
- Thyrosticta obliquipuncta Rothschild, 1924

Genus of moths

Toulgoetinaclia is a genus of moths in the subfamily Arctiinae. It contains the single species Toulgoetinaclia obliquipuncta, which is found in Madagascar.
