= Orcynia (moth) =

Scientific classification
- Kingdom: Animalia
- Phylum: Arthropoda
- Class: Insecta
- Order: Lepidoptera
- Superfamily: Noctuoidea
- Family: Erebidae
- Subfamily: Arctiinae
- Genus: Orcynia; Walker, 1854
- Species: O. calcarata

Binomial name
- Orcynia calcarata (Walker, 1854)

Synonyms
- Euchromia calcarata Walker, 1854

Genus of moths

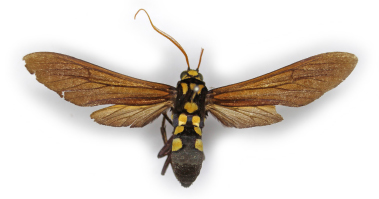
A male Orcynia calcarata

Orcynia is a monotypic moth genus in the subfamily Arctiinae. Its single species, Orcynia calcarata, is found in the Amazon region, including French Guiana. Both the genus and species were first described by Francis Walker in 1854.
