= Fletcherinia =

Scientific classification
- Domain: Eukaryota
- Kingdom: Animalia
- Phylum: Arthropoda
- Class: Insecta
- Order: Lepidoptera
- Superfamily: Noctuoidea
- Family: Erebidae
- Subfamily: Arctiinae
- Genus: Fletcherinia; Griveaud, 1964
- Species: F. decaryi

Binomial name
- Fletcherinia decaryi Griveaud, 1964

Genus of moths

Fletcherinia is a genus of moths in the subfamily Arctiinae. It contains the single species Fletcherinia decaryi, which is found in Madagascar.
