= Vadonaclia =

Scientific classification
- Domain: Eukaryota
- Kingdom: Animalia
- Phylum: Arthropoda
- Class: Insecta
- Order: Lepidoptera
- Superfamily: Noctuoidea
- Family: Erebidae
- Subfamily: Arctiinae
- Genus: Vadonaclia; Griveaud, 1964
- Species: V. marginepuncta

Binomial name
- Vadonaclia marginepuncta Griveaud, 1964

Genus of moths

Vadonaclia is a genus of moths in the subfamily Arctiinae. It contains the single species Vadonaclia marginepuncta, which is found on Madagascar.
