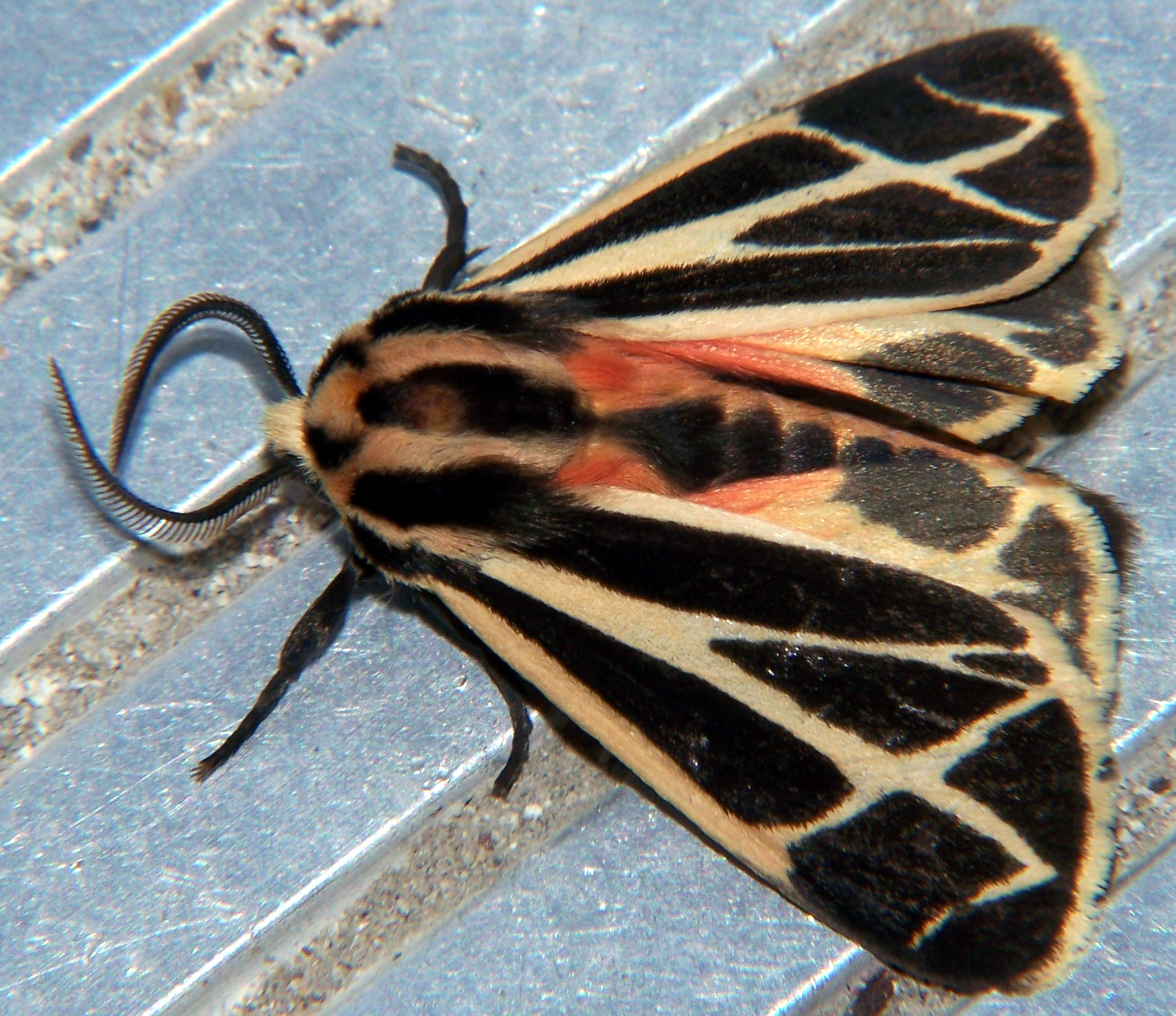
- Harnessed tiger moth Apantesis phalerata

Scientific classification
- Kingdom: Animalia
- Phylum: Arthropoda
- Clade: Pancrustacea
- Class: Insecta
- Order: Lepidoptera
- Superfamily: Noctuoidea
- Family: Erebidae
- Subfamily: Arctiinae; Leach, 1815

Type species
- Arctia caja (Linnaeus, 1758)

Diversity
- 1,400–1,500 genera Approximately 11,000 species

= Arctiinae =

Subfamily of moths

The Arctiinae (formerly called the family Arctiidae) are a large and diverse subfamily of moths with around 11,000 species found all over the world, including 6,000 neotropical species. This subfamily includes the groups commonly known as tiger moths (or tigers), which usually have bright colours, footmen, which are usually much drabber, lichen moths, and wasp moths. Many species have "hairy" caterpillars that are popularly known as woolly bears or woolly worms. The scientific name Arctiinae refers to this hairiness (Gk. αρκτος = a bear). Some species within the Arctiinae have the word "tussock"' in their common names because they have been misidentified as members of the Lymantriinae subfamily based on the characteristics of the larvae.

== Taxonomy ==
The subfamily was previously classified as the family Arctiidae of the superfamily Noctuoidea and is a monophyletic group. Recent phylogenetic studies have shown that the group is most closely related to litter moths Herminiinae and the Old World Aganainae, which are subfamilies of the family Erebidae. The Arctiidae as a whole have been reclassified to represent this relationship. The family was lowered to subfamily status as the Arctiinae within the Erebidae. The subfamilies and tribes of Arctiidae were lowered to tribes and subtribes, respectively, of this new Arctiinae to preserve the internal structure of the group.

Changes in taxon ranks and names are due to the classification of the former Arctiidae as the current Arctiinae.
Taxon rank	Former classification	Current classification
Superfamily	Noctuoidea	Noctuoidea
Family	Arctiidae	Erebidae
Subfamily	Arctiinae, Lithosiinae, Syntominae	Arctiinae
Tribe	Arctiini, Ctenuchini, Eudesmiini, Lithosiini, etc.	Arctiini, Lithosiini, Syntomini
Subtribe	—	Arctiina, Ctenuchina, Eudesmiina, Lithosiina, etc.
Genus	Many genera	Names and rank not changed
Species	Many species	Names and rank not changed
Taxa of the same background color represent the same group of species before and after its lowering of taxonomic rank, despite the change of suffixes.

== Tribes (former subfamilies) ==
Many genera are classified into these tribes, while others remain unclassified (incertae sedis).

- Arctiini
- Lithosiini
- Syntomini

== Description ==
The most distinctive feature of the subfamily is a tymbal organ on the metathorax. This organ has membranes that are vibrated to produce ultrasonic sounds. They also have thoracic tympanal organs for hearing, a trait with a fairly broad distribution in the Lepidoptera, but the location and structure is distinctive to the subfamily. Other distinctive traits are particular setae (hairs) on the larvae, wing venation, and a pair of glands near the ovipositor. The sounds are used in mating and for defense against predators. Another good distinguishing character of the subfamily is presence of anal glands in females.

== Aposematism ==
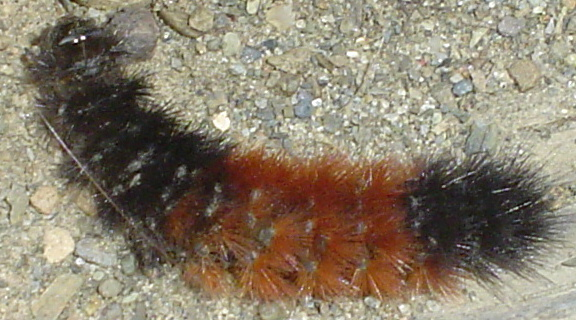
Banded woolly bear, Pyrrharctia isabella

Many species retain distasteful or poisonous chemicals acquired from their host plants. Some species also have the ability to make their own defenses. Common defenses include cardiac glycosides (or cardenolides), pyrrolizidine alkaloids, pyrazines, and histamines. Larvae usually acquire these chemicals, and may retain them in the adult stage, but adults can acquire them, too, by regurgitating decomposing plants containing the compounds and sucking up the fluid. Adults can transfer the defenses to their eggs, and males sometimes transfer them to females to help with defense of the eggs. Larval "hairs" may be stinging in some species, due to histamines their caterpillars make.

The insects advertise these defenses with aposematic bright coloration, unusual postures, odours, or in adults, ultrasonic vibrations. Some mimic moths that are poisonous or wasps that sting. The ultrasound signals help nocturnal predators to learn to avoid the moths, and for some species can jam bat echolocation.

== Behavior and life cycle ==
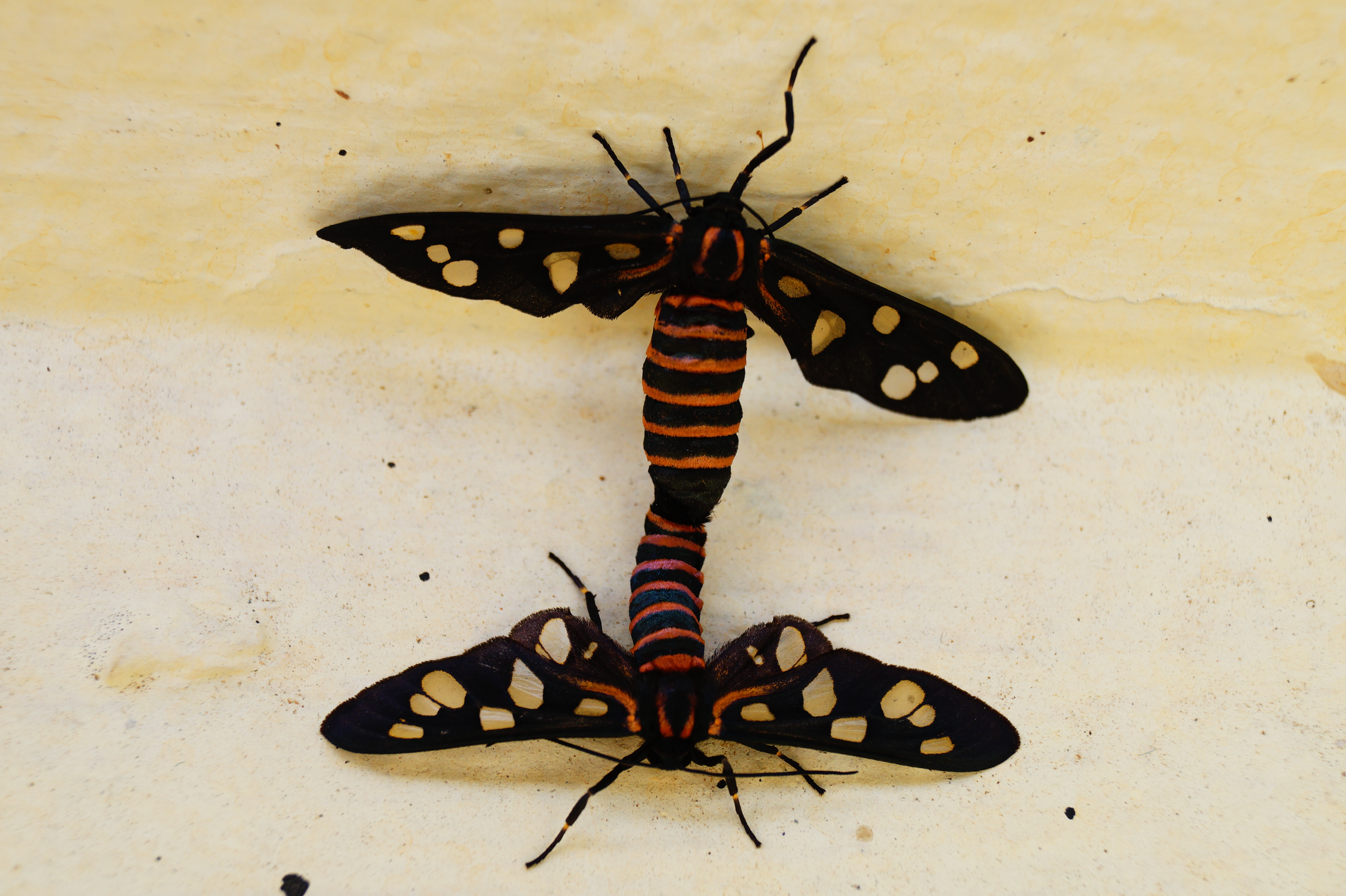
Copulation in tiger moth

Many of the caterpillars and adults are active during the daytime, but most species of this taxon are night-flying. Moths are attracted by light, but one species, Borearctia menetriesii, never comes to the light. Basking to accelerate digestion is common in the larval stages, and social behaviour may range from solitary to gregarious. Like most Lepidoptera, larvae produce a small silk pad before each moult, in which their prolegs are engaged.

If disturbed, woolly bear caterpillars roll into a tight spiral or drop from their perch suspended by a strand of silk. Isabella tiger moths (Pyrrharctia isabella) overwinter in the caterpillar stage. They can survive freezing at moderate subzero temperatures by producing a cryoprotectant chemical. The larvae of another species, Phragmatobia fuliginosa, may be found on snow seeking a place to pupate. Species in Arctic and temperate belts overwinter in the larval stage.

Some tiger moths produce ultrasonic clicks in response to the echolocation of bats to protect themselves.

Many species are polyphagous in the larval stage. Monophagous species, such as the cinnabar moth (Tyria jacobaeae), are scarce.

Although abundant, few species in this subfamily are of economic importance. Even the fall webworm, an abundant and highly polyphagous tree-feeding species that has spread from North America to Asia and Europe, does not do lasting damage to healthy hosts.

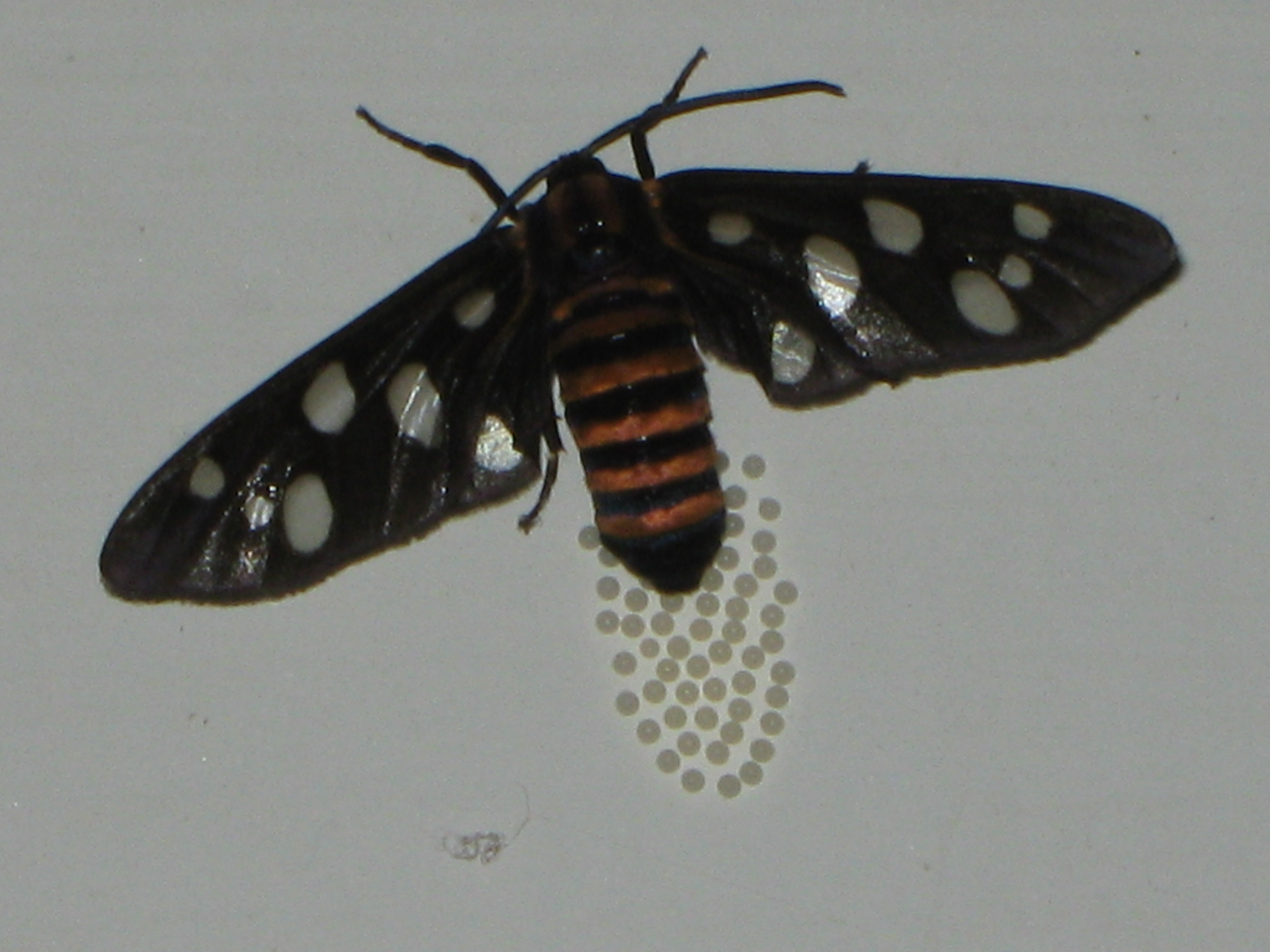
Tiger moth laying eggs

== Folklore ==
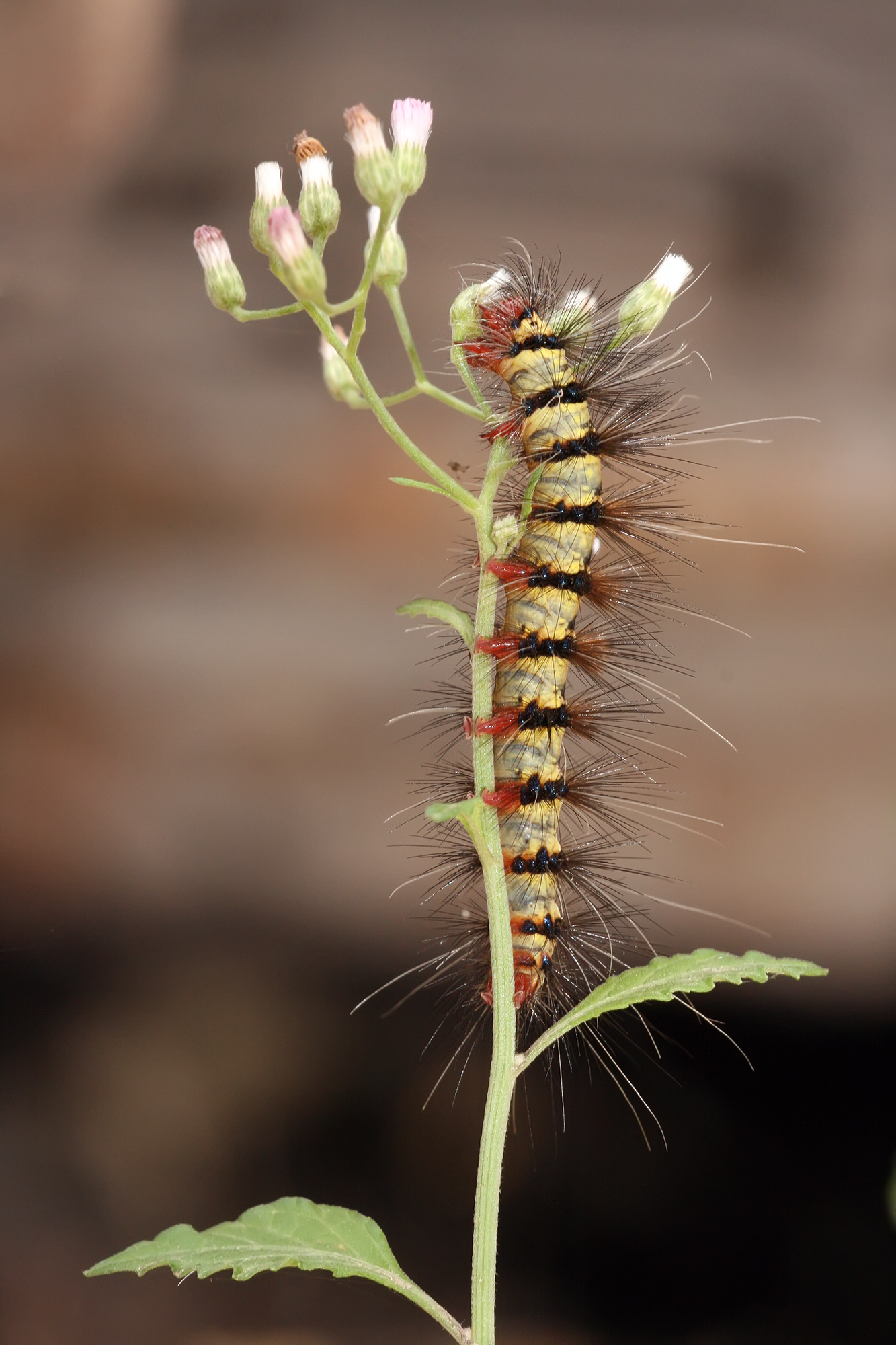
Caterpillar on Asteraceae plant

Local folklore of the American Northeast and South hold that "woolly bears" (or "woolly worms" in the South) help humans predict the weather, similar to the groundhog. The forthcoming severity of a winter may be indicated by the amount of black on the Isabella tiger moth's caterpillar—the most familiar woolly bear in North America. More brown than black is said to mean a mild winter, while more black than brown is supposed to mean a harsh winter. However, the relative width of the black band varies among instars, not according to weather. The mythical qualities attributed to woolly bears in America have led to such things as the Woollybear Festival in Ohio, the Woolly Worm Festival in Beattyville, Kentucky and the Woolly Worm Festival in Banner Elk, North Carolina.

== Notable species ==
- Pale tiger moth, Halysidota tessellaris
- Banded woolly bear or Isabella tiger moth, Pyrrharctia isabella
- Buff ermine, Spilarctia lutea
- Cinnabar moth, Tyria jacobaeae
- Common footman, Manulea lurideola
- Dogbane tiger moth or delicate cycnia, Cycnia tenera
- Fall webworm, Hyphantria cunea
- Garden tiger moth, Arctia caja
- Grote's Bertholdia, Bertholdia trigona
- Giant leopard moth, Hypercompe scribonia
- Hickory tiger moth, Lophocampa caryae
- Jersey tiger moth, Euplagia quadripunctaria
- Milkweed tiger moth, Euchaetes egle
- Scarlet tiger moth, Callimorpha dominula
- Maltese ruby tiger moth, Phragmatobia fuliginosa ssp. melitensis
- Ornate moth, Utetheisa ornatrix
- Muxta, Muxta xanthopa

== Gallery ==
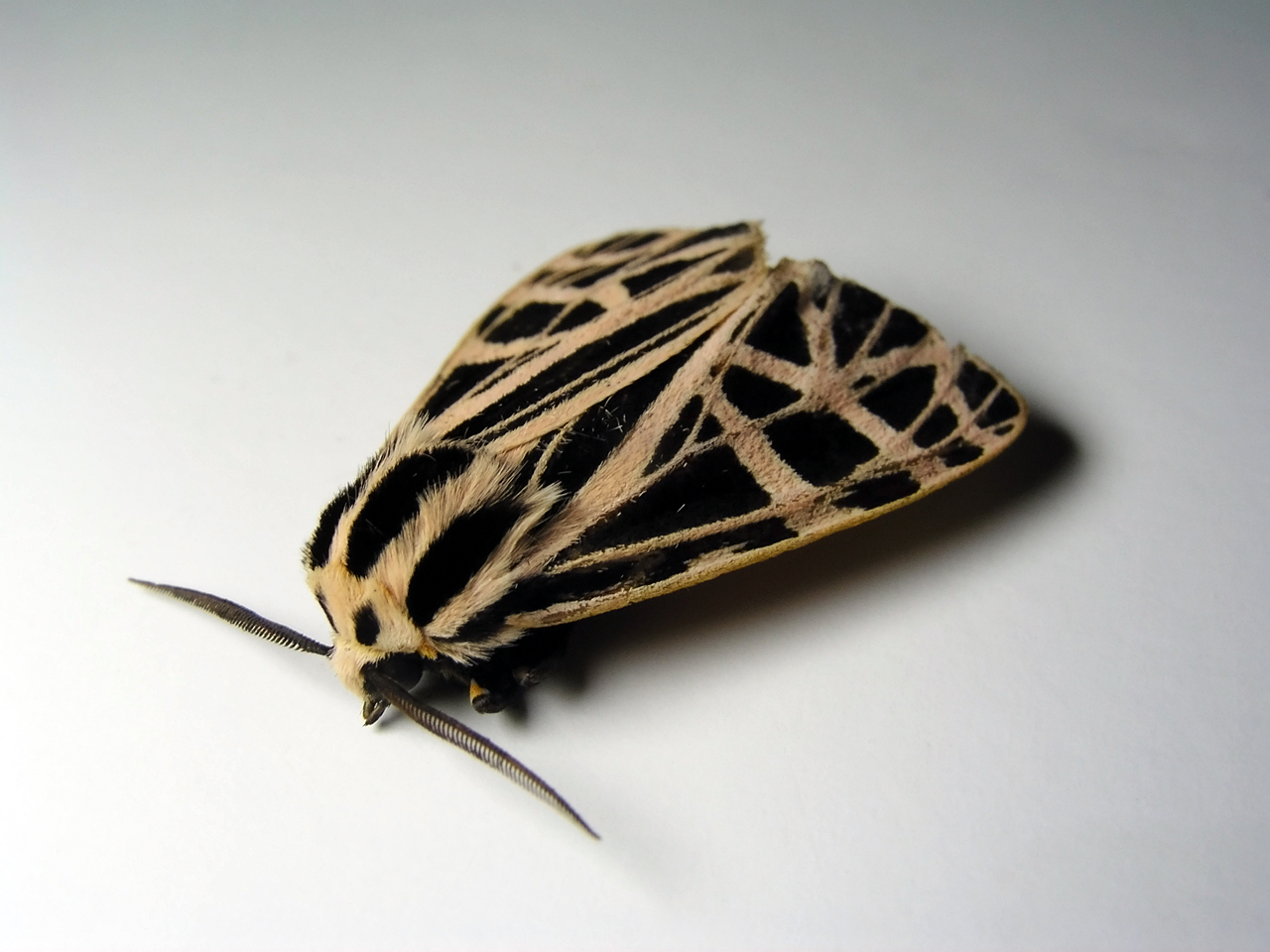
Grammia parthenice

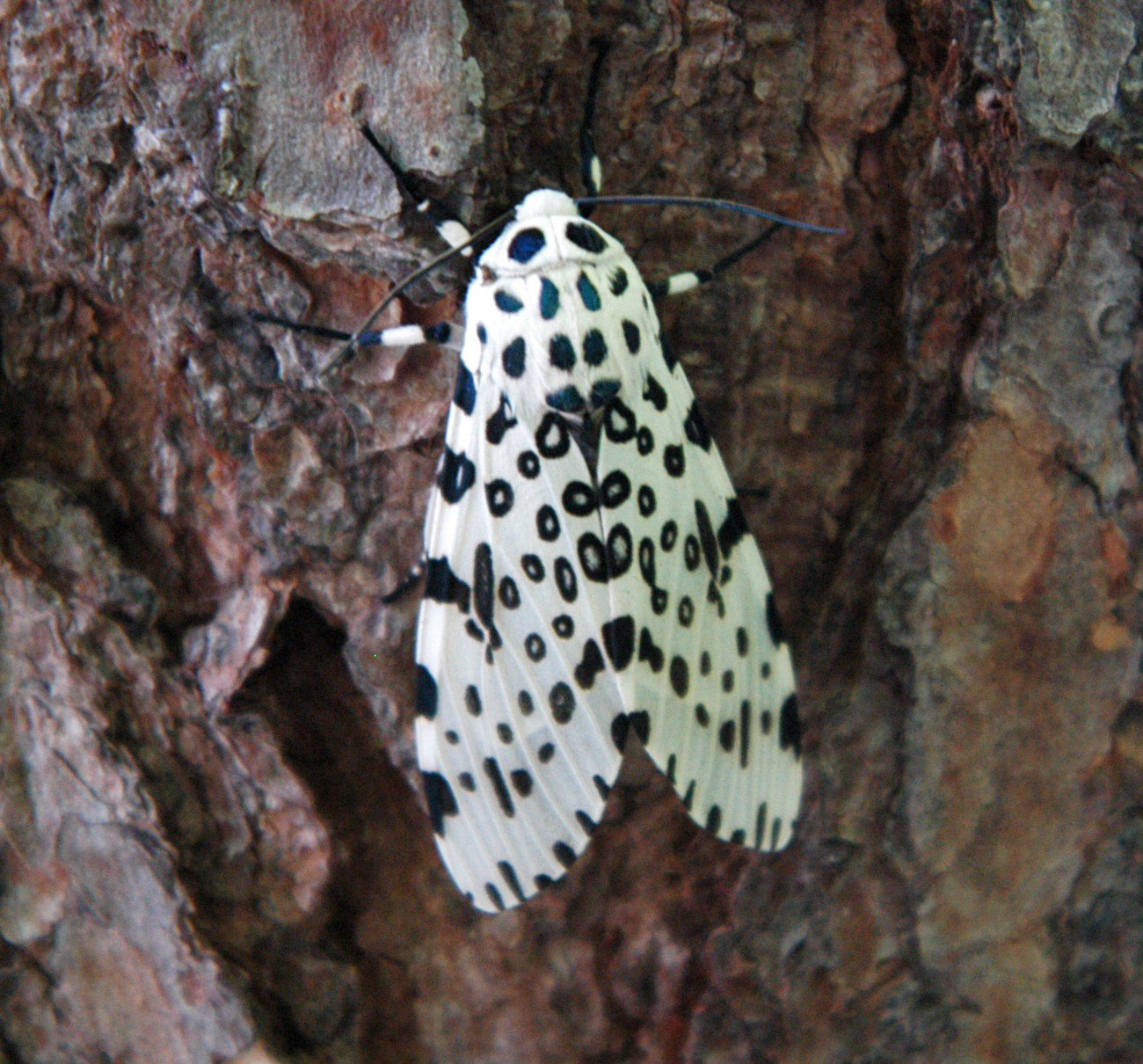
Giant leopard moth Hypercompe scribonia

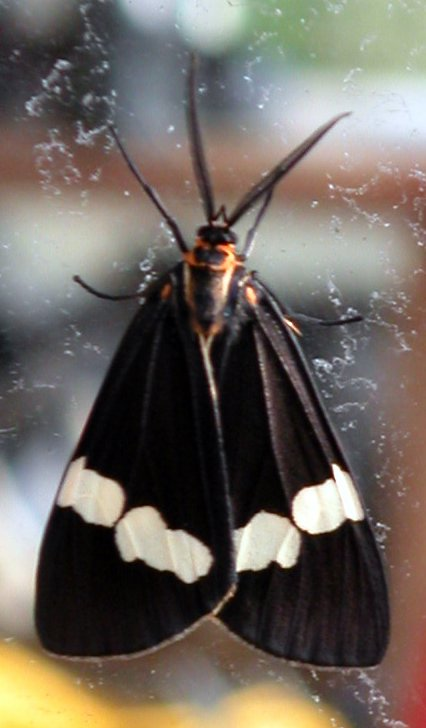
Nyctemera

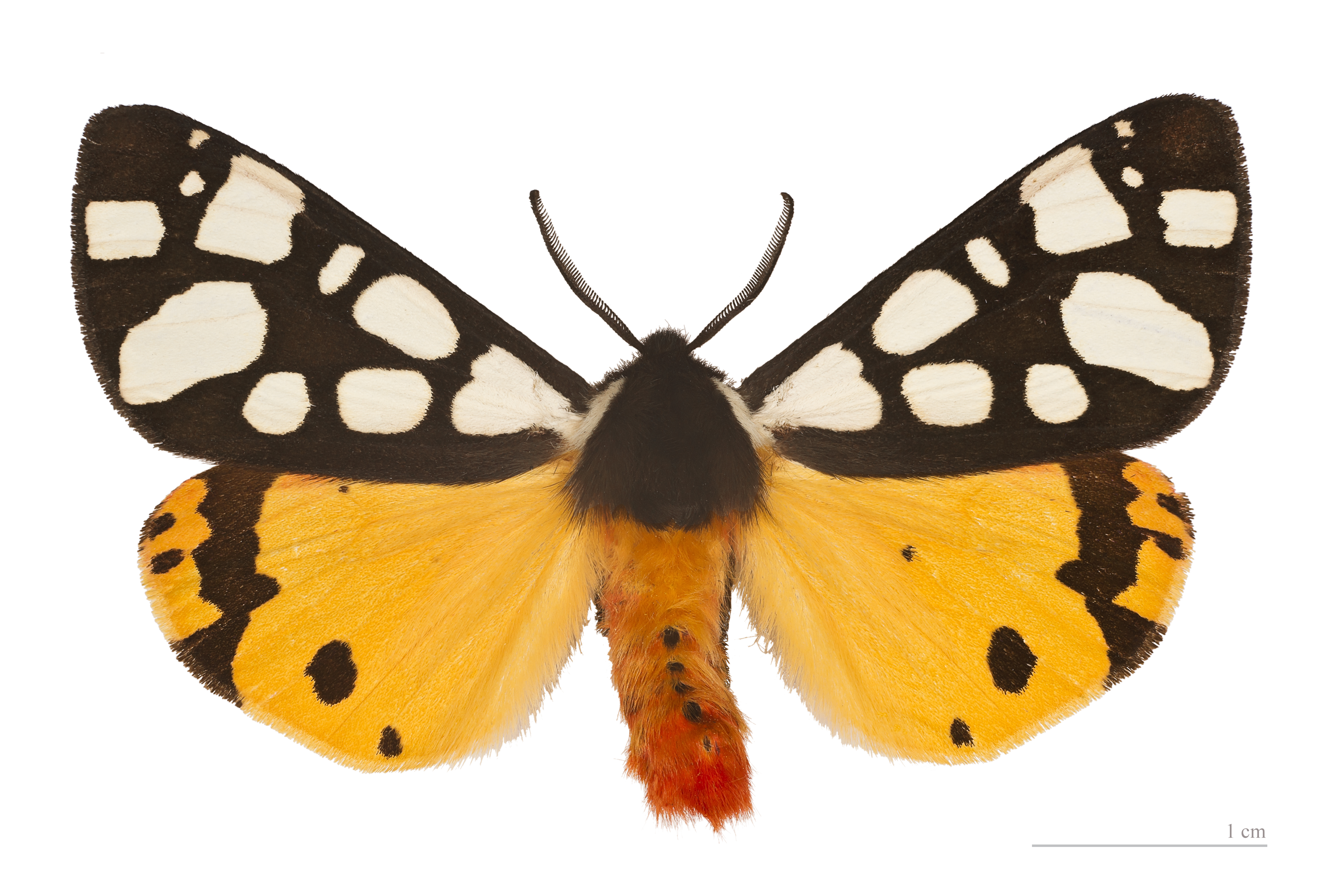
Arctia villica

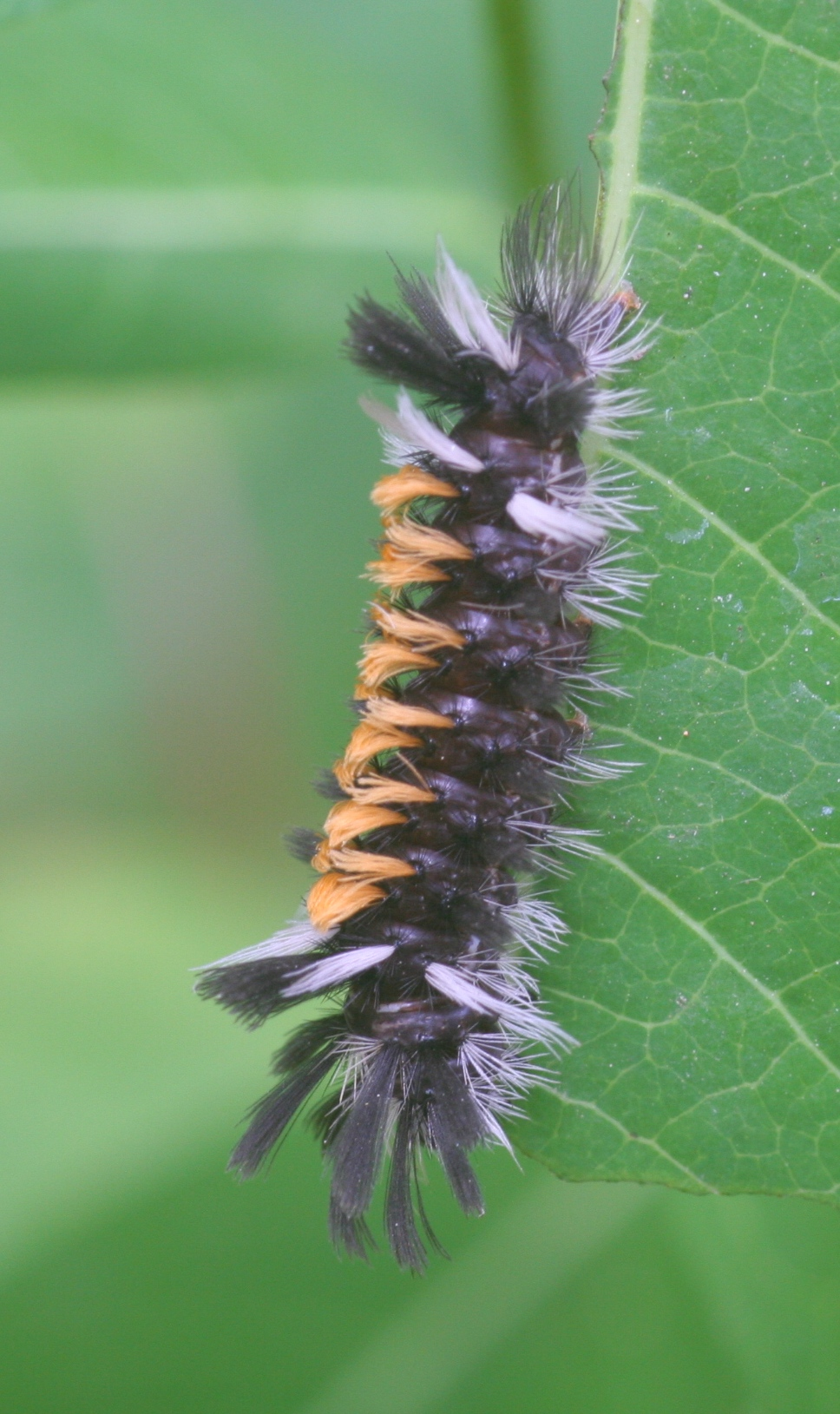
Final instar of Euchaetes egle

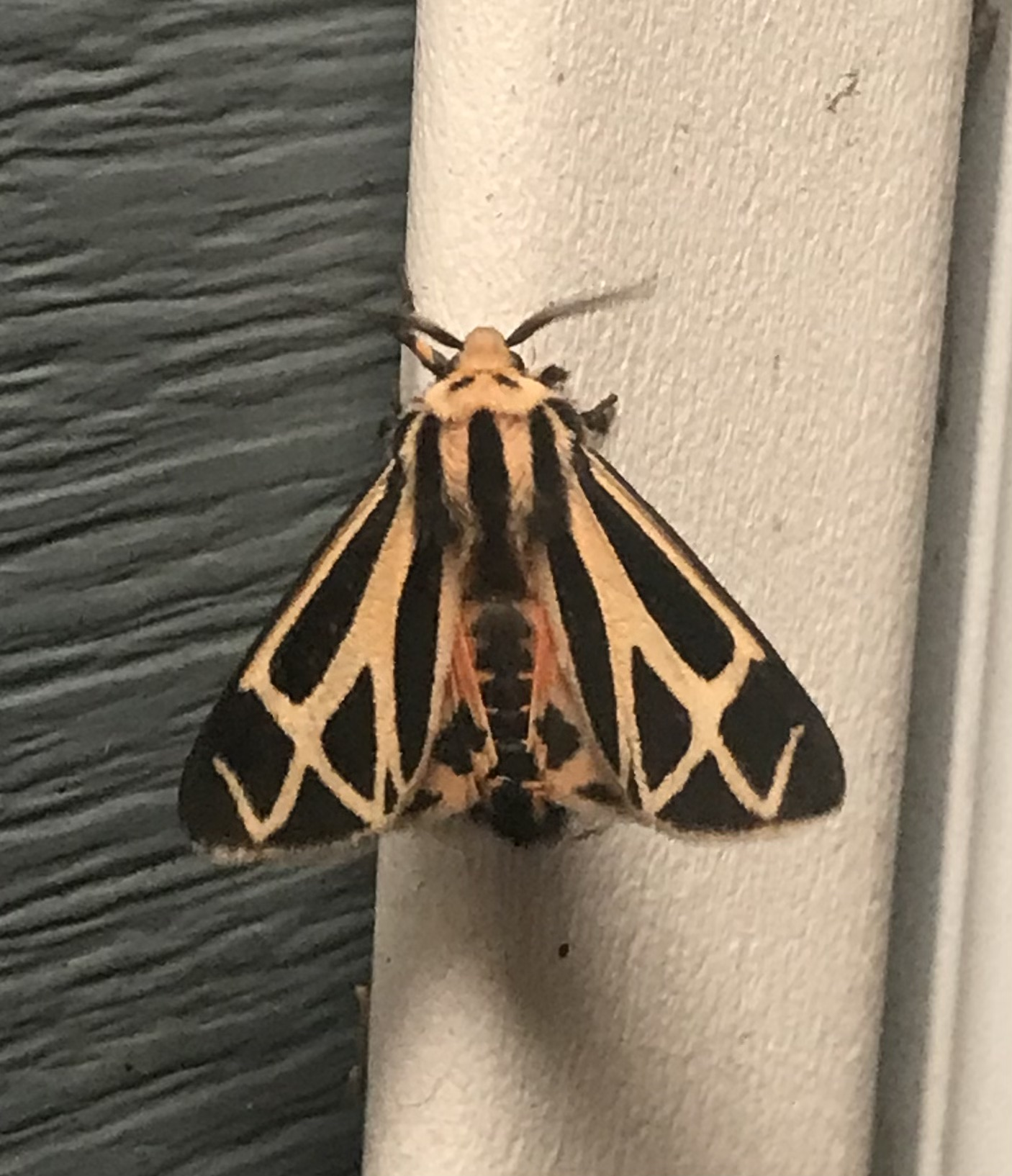
Apantesis phalerata

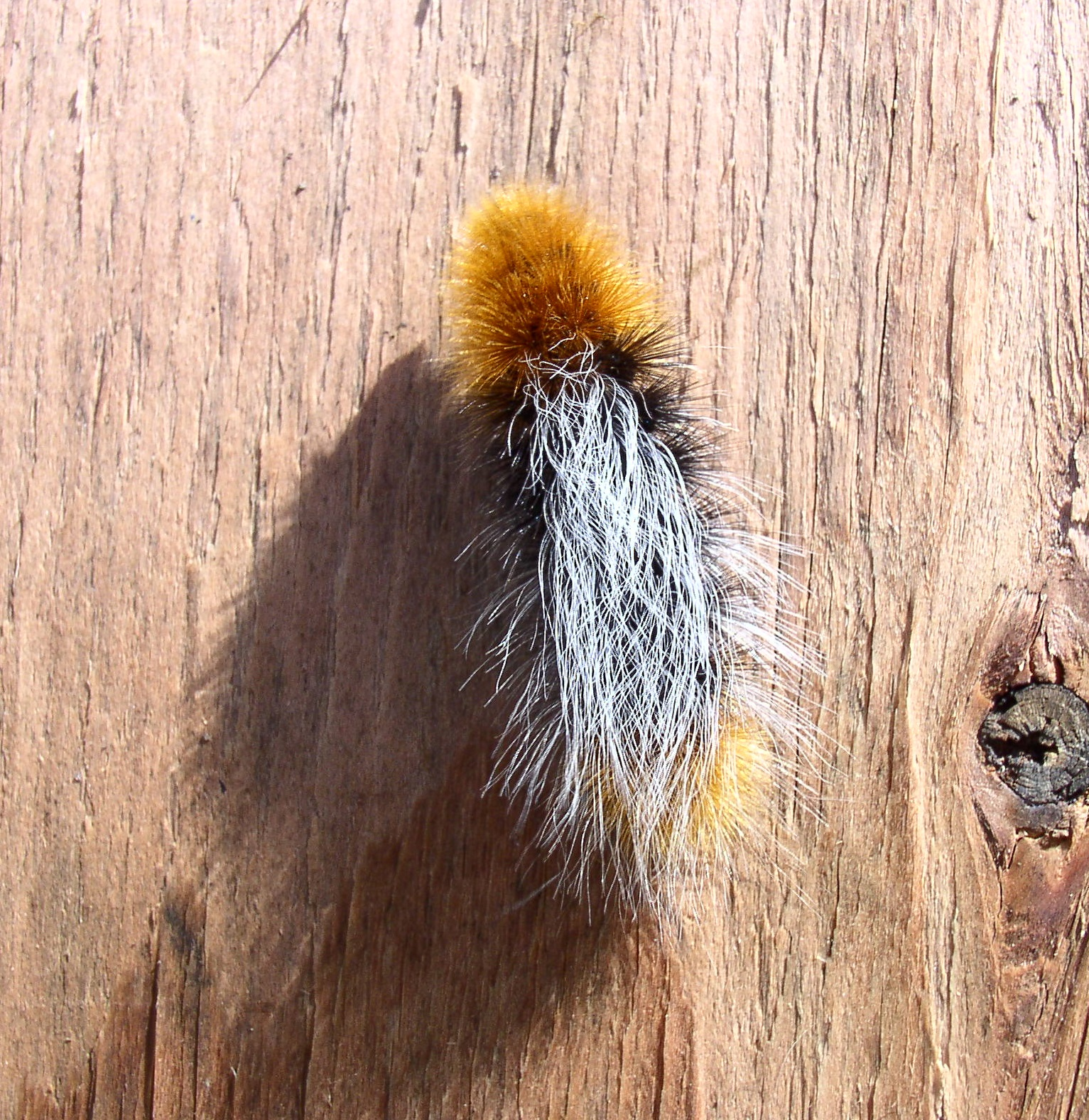
Platyprepia virginalis, caterpillar

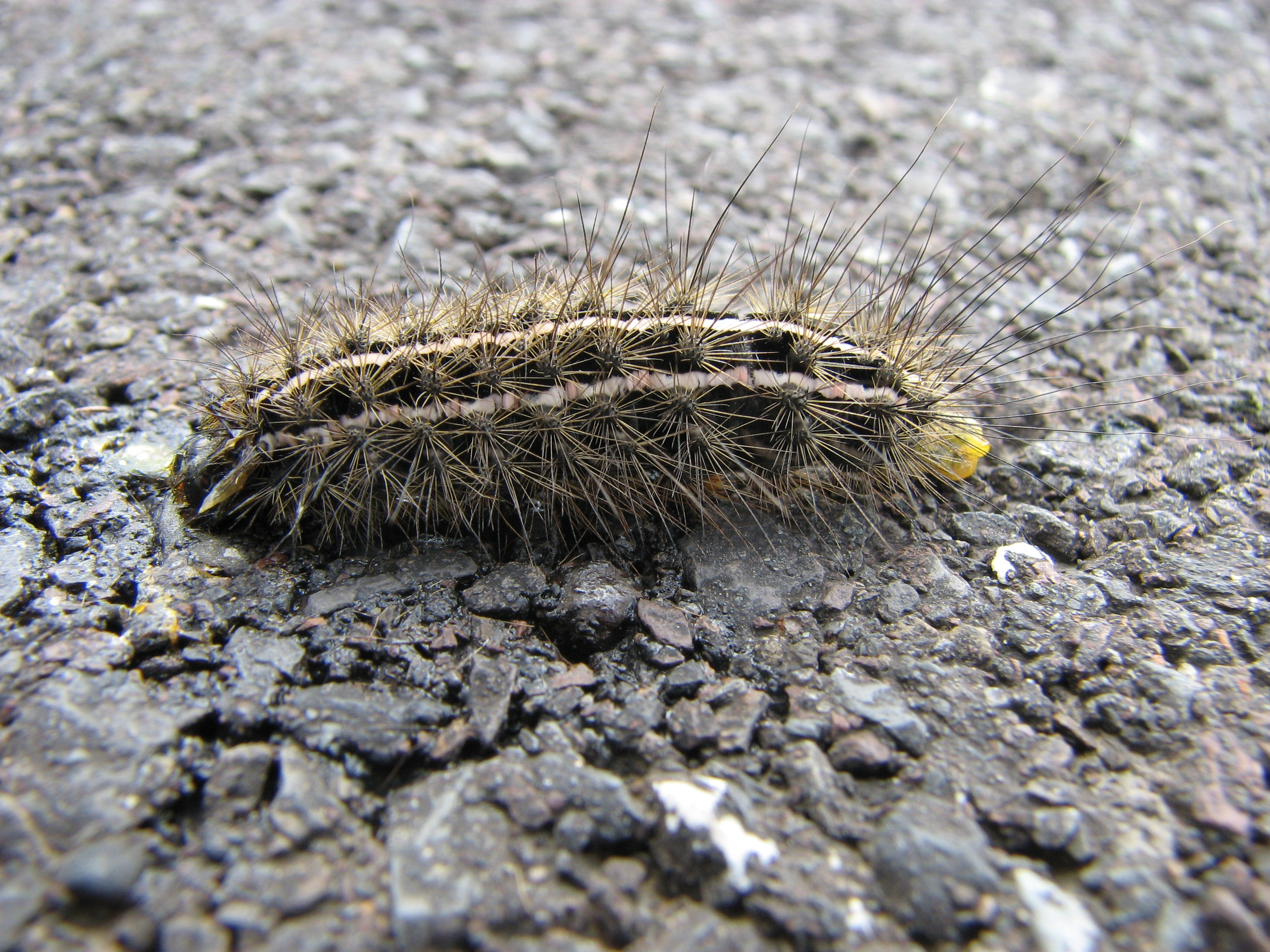
Apantesis arge, caterpillar

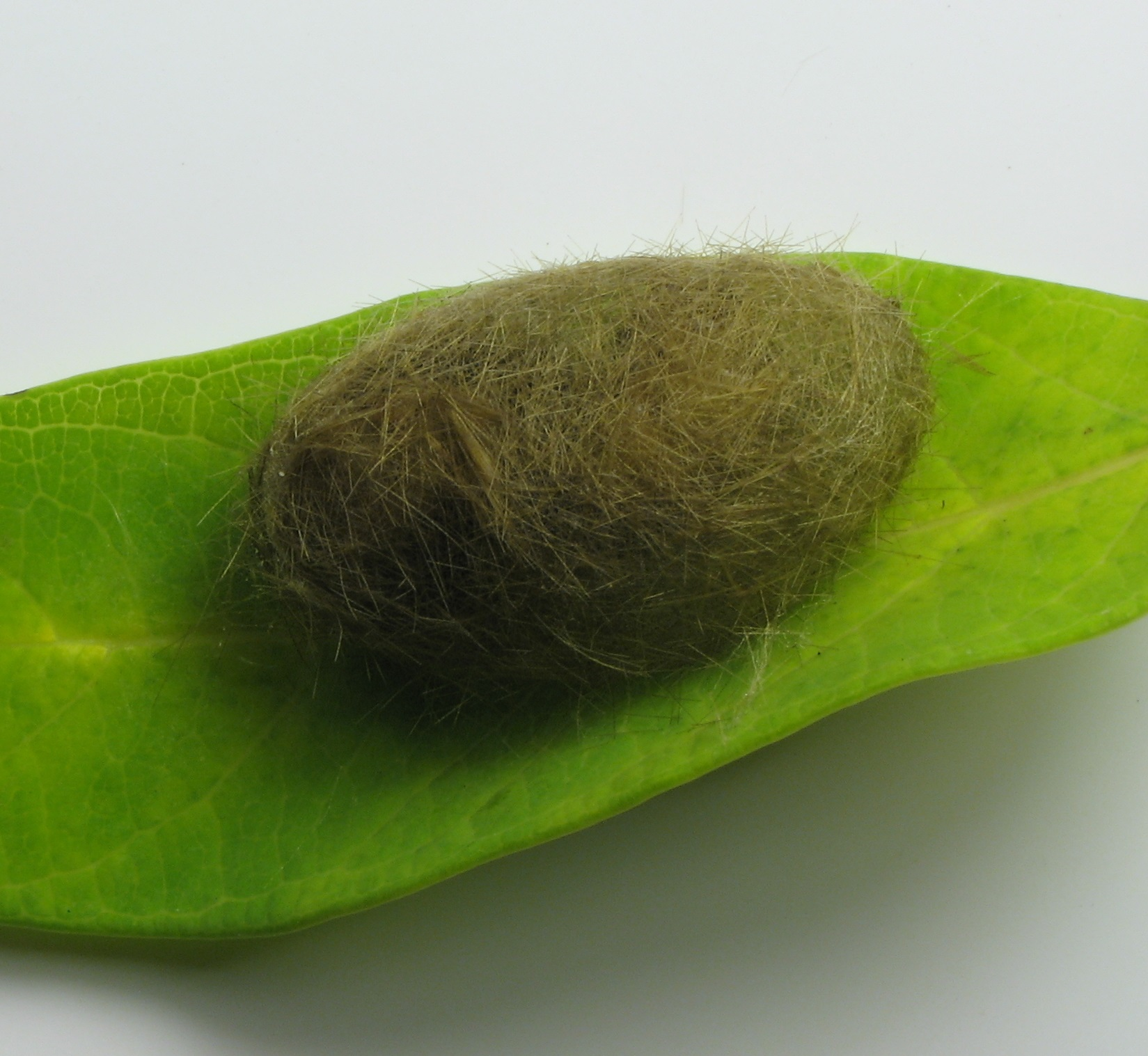
Halysidota tessellaris, cocoon

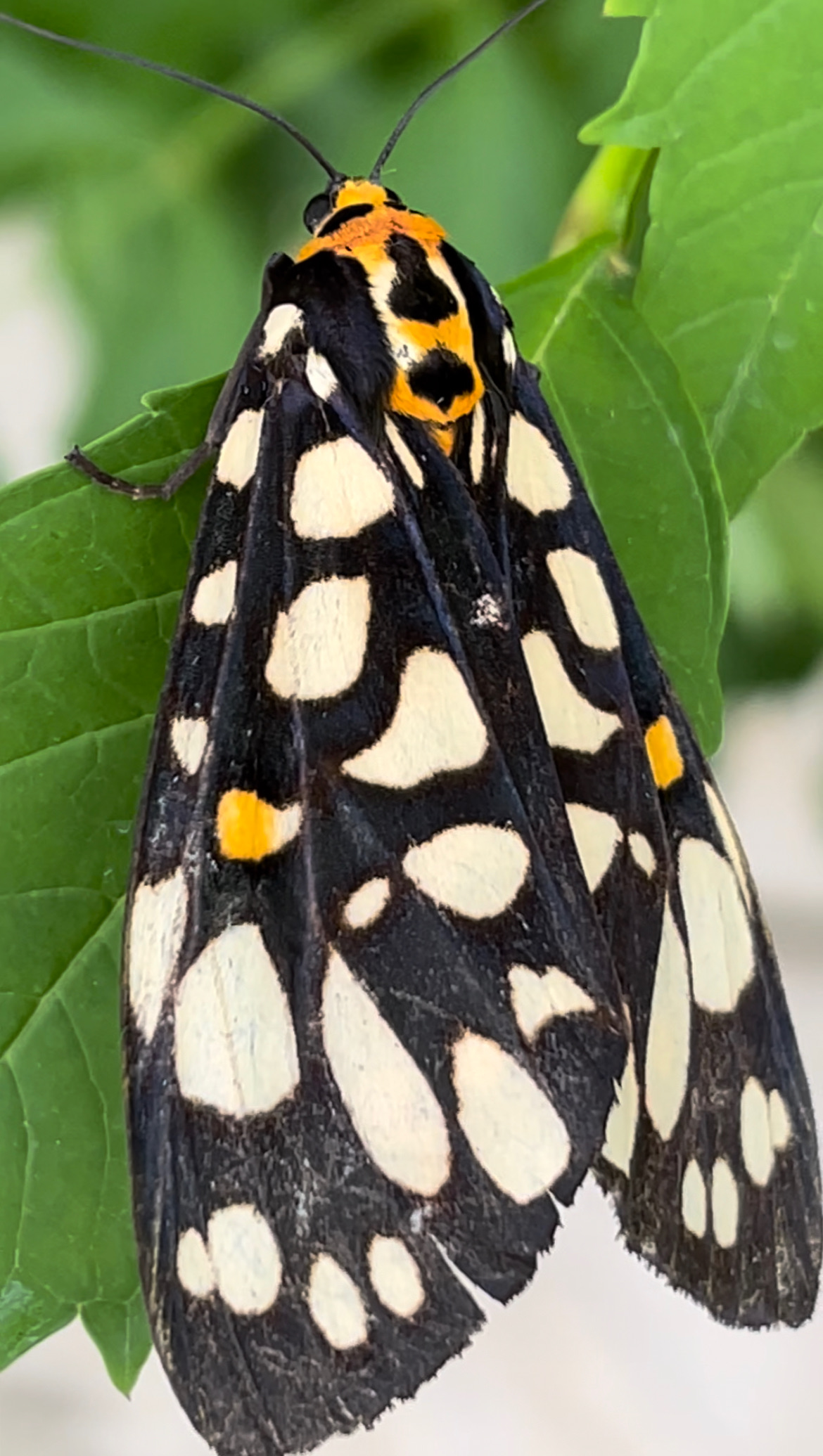
Aglaomorpha histrio

== See also ==
- List of arctiine genera
