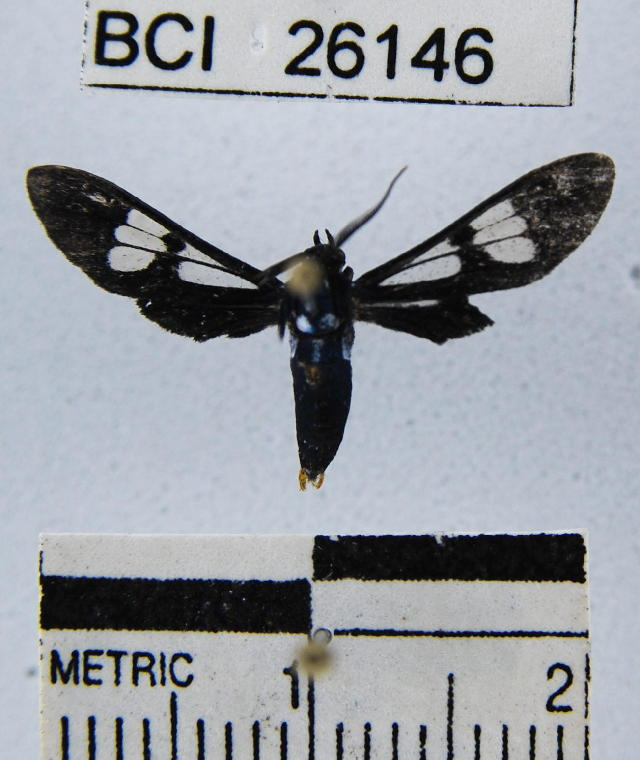
- Saurita mora

Scientific classification
- Domain: Eukaryota
- Kingdom: Animalia
- Phylum: Arthropoda
- Class: Insecta
- Order: Lepidoptera
- Superfamily: Noctuoidea
- Family: Erebidae
- Subfamily: Arctiinae
- Subtribe: Euchromiina
- Genus: Saurita; Herrich-Schäffer, [1855]

Synonyms
- Pseudomya Hübner, [1819]; Echoneura Butler, 1876; Thrinacia Butler, 1876

= Saurita =

Genus of moths

Saurita is a genus of moths in the subfamily Arctiinae. The genus was erected by Gottlieb August Wilhelm Herrich-Schäffer in 1855.

== Species ==
The genus includes the following species:

- Saurita absona Draudt, 1915
- Saurita admota Draudt, 1931
- Saurita anselma Schaus, 1924
- Saurita araguana Draudt, 1931
- Saurita arimensis Fleming, 1957
- Saurita astyoche Geyer, 1832
- Saurita attenuata Hampson, 1905
- Saurita bipuncta Hampson, 1898
- Saurita biradiata Felder, 1869
- Saurita cassandra Linnaeus, 1758
- Saurita clandestina Zerny, 1912
- Saurita coccinea Draudt, 1915
- Saurita concisa Walker, 1854
- Saurita concisina Bryk, 1953
- Saurita cretheis Druce, 1883
- Saurita cryptoleuca Walker, 1854
- Saurita diaphana Dognin, 1906
- Saurita diffusa Schaus, 1911
- Saurita erythroguia Hampson, 1898
- Saurita fumosa Schaus, 1912
- Saurita fusca Dognin, 1923
- Saurita geralda Schaus, 1924
- Saurita gracula Dognin, 1911
- Saurita hemiphaea Dognin, 1909
- Saurita hilda Druce, 1906
- Saurita incerta Walker, 1856
- Saurita intricata Walker, 1854
- Saurita lacteata Butler, 1877
- Saurita lacteipars Dognin, 1914
- Saurita lasiphlebia Dognin, 1906
- Saurita latens Schaus, 1911
- Saurita mediorubra Kaye
- Saurita melanifera Kaye, 1911
- Saurita melanota Hampson, 1909
- Saurita mora Druce, 1897
- Saurita mosca Dognin, 1897
- Saurita myrrha Druce, 1884
- Saurita myrrhina Draudt, 1931
- Saurita nigripalpia Hampson, 1898
- Saurita nox Druce, 1896
- Saurita ochreiventris Dognin, 1902
- Saurita pebasa Kaye, 1918
- Saurita pellucida Schaus, 1892
- Saurita perspicua Schaus, 1905
- Saurita phoenicosticta Hampson, 1898
- Saurita pilipennis Zerny, 1931
- Saurita rubripuncta Schaus, 1911
- Saurita salta Schaus, 1894
- Saurita sanguinea Druce, 1884
- Saurita sanguisecta Hampson, 1898
- Saurita sericea Herrich-Schäffer, 1854
- Saurita strymoides Draudt, 1931
- Saurita submacula Schaus, 1911
- Saurita temenus Stoll, 1782
- Saurita tenuis Butler, 1876
- Saurita tetraema Forbes, 1939
- Saurita tijuca Schaus, 1892
- Saurita tipulina Hübner, 1827
- Saurita triangulifera Druce, 1898
- Saurita trichopteraeformis Jörgensen, 1913
- Saurita tricolor Schaus, 1905
- Saurita tristissima Perty, 1834
- Saurita vindonissa Druce, 1883
- Saurita watsoni Rothschild, 1911

== Former species ==
- Saurita catastibina Butler, 1876
- Saurita intensa Walker, 1854
- Saurita ladan Druce, 1896
- Saurita mecrida Druce, 1889
- Saurita musca Schaus, 1892
- Saurita notabilis Walker, 1854
- Saurita ochracea Felder, 1869
- Saurita stryma Druce, 1884
- Saurita vitristriga Druce, 1897
