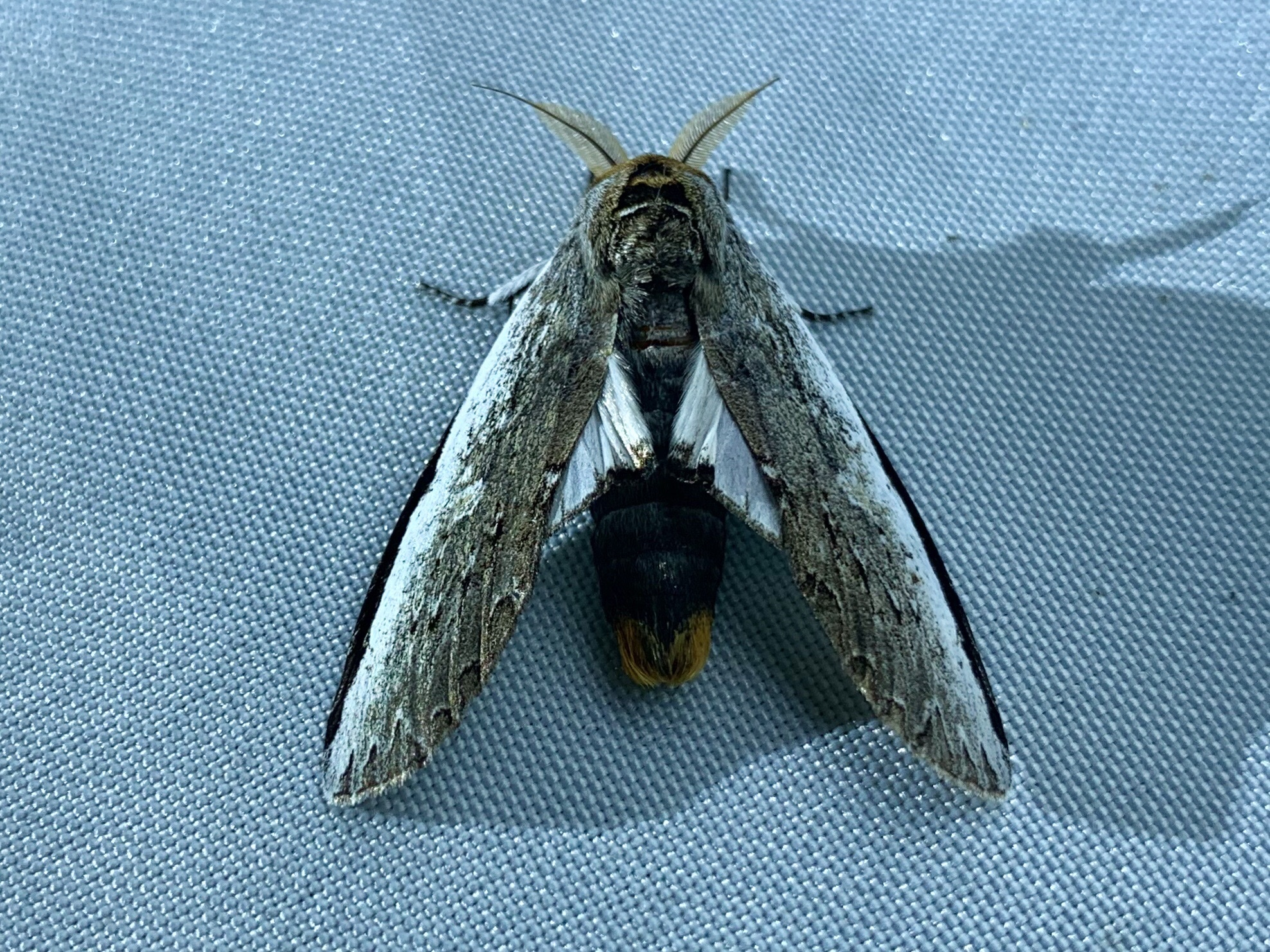
- In Panama

Scientific classification
- Kingdom: Animalia
- Phylum: Arthropoda
- Class: Insecta
- Order: Lepidoptera
- Superfamily: Noctuoidea
- Family: Notodontidae
- Genus: Lirimiris
- Species: L. auriflua

Binomial name
- Lirimiris auriflua Draudt 1932

= Lirimiris auriflua =

Species of moth

Lirimiris auriflua is a moth of the family Notodontidae. It was first described by German entomologist Max Wilhelm Karl Draudt in 1932. It has been reported in Costa Rica, Paraguay, Argentina, Brazil and Peru. It is one of the species of Lepidoptera in which brachyptery (an anatomical condition of wing reduction) is known to occur.
