= Narosodes hampsoni =

Scientific classification
- Domain: Eukaryota
- Kingdom: Animalia
- Phylum: Arthropoda
- Class: Insecta
- Order: Lepidoptera
- Superfamily: Noctuoidea
- Family: Erebidae
- Subfamily: Arctiinae
- Genus: Narosodes
- Species: N. hampsoni

Binomial name
- Narosodes hampsoni Draudt, 1914

Species of moth

Narosodes hampsoni is a moth of the family Erebidae. It was described by Max Wilhelm Karl Draudt in 1914. It is found on Borneo.
