= Tibira illauta =

Scientific classification
- Kingdom: Animalia
- Phylum: Arthropoda
- Clade: Pancrustacea
- Class: Insecta
- Order: Lepidoptera
- Family: Apatelodidae
- Genus: Tibira
- Species: T. illauta

Binomial name
- Tibira illauta (Draudt, 1929)

Synonyms
- Colabata illauta Draudt, 1929; Ephoria illauta (Draudt, 1929)

Species of moth

Tibira illauta is a species of moth in the family Apatelodidae. It was first described by Max Wilhelm Karl Draudt in 1929.
