= Poecilosoma annulatum =

Scientific classification
- Kingdom: Animalia
- Phylum: Arthropoda
- Clade: Pancrustacea
- Class: Insecta
- Order: Lepidoptera
- Superfamily: Noctuoidea
- Family: Erebidae
- Subfamily: Arctiinae
- Genus: Poecilosoma
- Species: P. annulatum

Binomial name
- Poecilosoma annulatum Draudt, 1915

Synonyms
- Pocilosoma annulatum

Species of moth

Poecilosoma annulatum is a moth in the subfamily Arctiinae. It was described by Max Wilhelm Karl Draudt in 1915. It is found in Bolivia.
