= Euagra seraphica =

Scientific classification
- Kingdom: Animalia
- Phylum: Arthropoda
- Class: Insecta
- Order: Lepidoptera
- Superfamily: Noctuoidea
- Family: Erebidae
- Subfamily: Arctiinae
- Genus: Euagra
- Species: E. seraphica

Binomial name
- Euagra seraphica Draudt, 1917

Species of moth

Euagra seraphica is a moth of the subfamily Arctiinae. It was described by Max Wilhelm Karl Draudt in 1917. It is found in Colombia.
