= Cercocladia novicia =

Scientific classification
- Domain: Eukaryota
- Kingdom: Animalia
- Phylum: Arthropoda
- Class: Insecta
- Order: Lepidoptera
- Superfamily: Noctuoidea
- Family: Erebidae
- Subfamily: Arctiinae
- Genus: Cercocladia
- Species: C. novicia

Binomial name
- Cercocladia novicia Draudt, 1915

Species of moth

Cercocladia novicia is a moth of the subfamily Arctiinae. It was described by Max Wilhelm Karl Draudt in 1915. It is found in Brazil.
