= Metalobosia postflavida =

Scientific classification
- Domain: Eukaryota
- Kingdom: Animalia
- Phylum: Arthropoda
- Class: Insecta
- Order: Lepidoptera
- Superfamily: Noctuoidea
- Family: Erebidae
- Subfamily: Arctiinae
- Genus: Metalobosia
- Species: M. postflavida

Binomial name
- Metalobosia postflavida Draudt, 1918

Species of moth

Metalobosia postflavida is a moth of the subfamily Arctiinae. It was described by Max Wilhelm Karl Draudt in 1918. It is found in Panama.
