= Eriphioides ecuadoriensis =

Scientific classification
- Kingdom: Animalia
- Phylum: Arthropoda
- Class: Insecta
- Order: Lepidoptera
- Superfamily: Noctuoidea
- Family: Erebidae
- Subfamily: Arctiinae
- Genus: Eriphioides
- Species: E. ecuadoriensis

Binomial name
- Eriphioides ecuadoriensis Draudt, 1915

Species of moth

Eriphioides ecuadoriensis is a moth of the subfamily Arctiinae. It was described by Max Wilhelm Karl Draudt in 1915. It is found in Ecuador.
