= Saurita absona =

Scientific classification
- Domain: Eukaryota
- Kingdom: Animalia
- Phylum: Arthropoda
- Class: Insecta
- Order: Lepidoptera
- Superfamily: Noctuoidea
- Family: Erebidae
- Subfamily: Arctiinae
- Genus: Saurita
- Species: S. absona

Binomial name
- Saurita absona (Draudt, 1915)

Synonyms
- Pseudomya absona Draudt, 1915

Species of moth

Saurita absona is a moth in the subfamily Arctiinae. It was described by Max Wilhelm Karl Draudt in 1915. It is found in Peru.
