= Ptychotricos episcepsidis =

Scientific classification
- Domain: Eukaryota
- Kingdom: Animalia
- Phylum: Arthropoda
- Class: Insecta
- Order: Lepidoptera
- Superfamily: Noctuoidea
- Family: Erebidae
- Subfamily: Arctiinae
- Genus: Ptychotricos
- Species: P. episcepsidis

Binomial name
- Ptychotricos episcepsidis (Draudt, 1931)

Synonyms
- Heliura episcepsidis Draudt, 1931

South American species of moth

Ptychotricos episcepsidis is a moth in the subfamily Arctiinae. It was described by Max Wilhelm Karl Draudt in 1931. It is found in Bolivia.
