= Euagra cerymica =

Scientific classification
- Domain: Eukaryota
- Kingdom: Animalia
- Phylum: Arthropoda
- Class: Insecta
- Order: Lepidoptera
- Superfamily: Noctuoidea
- Family: Erebidae
- Subfamily: Arctiinae
- Genus: Euagra
- Species: E. cerymica

Binomial name
- Euagra cerymica H. Druce, 1893

Species of moth

Euagra cerymica is a moth of the subfamily Arctiinae. It was described by Herbert Druce in 1893. It is found in Panama.
