= Metalobosia elis =

Scientific classification
- Domain: Eukaryota
- Kingdom: Animalia
- Phylum: Arthropoda
- Class: Insecta
- Order: Lepidoptera
- Superfamily: Noctuoidea
- Family: Erebidae
- Subfamily: Arctiinae
- Genus: Metalobosia
- Species: M. elis

Binomial name
- Metalobosia elis (H. Druce, 1885)

Synonyms
- Odozana elis H. Druce, 1885

Species of moth

Metalobosia elis is a moth of the subfamily Arctiinae. It was described by Herbert Druce in 1885. It is found in Guatemala and the Brazilian states of São Paulo and Paraná.
