= Ixylasia schausi =

Scientific classification
- Domain: Eukaryota
- Kingdom: Animalia
- Phylum: Arthropoda
- Class: Insecta
- Order: Lepidoptera
- Superfamily: Noctuoidea
- Family: Erebidae
- Subfamily: Arctiinae
- Genus: Ixylasia
- Species: I. schausi

Binomial name
- Ixylasia schausi (H. Druce, 1896)

Synonyms
- Eupyra schausi H. Druce, 1896

Species of moth

Ixylasia schausi is a moth of the subfamily Arctiinae. It was described by Herbert Druce in 1896. It is found in Mexico.
