= Saurita sanguisecta =

Scientific classification
- Kingdom: Animalia
- Phylum: Arthropoda
- Class: Insecta
- Order: Lepidoptera
- Superfamily: Noctuoidea
- Family: Erebidae
- Subfamily: Arctiinae
- Genus: Saurita
- Species: S. sanguisecta

Binomial name
- Saurita sanguisecta Hampson, 1898

Species of moth

Saurita sanguisecta is a moth in the subfamily Arctiinae found in Colombia, described by George Hampson in 1898.
