= Saurita biradiata =

Scientific classification
- Domain: Eukaryota
- Kingdom: Animalia
- Phylum: Arthropoda
- Class: Insecta
- Order: Lepidoptera
- Superfamily: Noctuoidea
- Family: Erebidae
- Subfamily: Arctiinae
- Genus: Saurita
- Species: S. biradiata

Binomial name
- Saurita biradiata (Felder, 1869)

Synonyms
- Pseudomya biradiata Felder, 1874

Species of moth

Saurita biradiata is a moth in the subfamily Arctiinae. It was described by Felder in 1869. It is found in the Amazon region.
