= Saurita pebasa =

Scientific classification
- Domain: Eukaryota
- Kingdom: Animalia
- Phylum: Arthropoda
- Class: Insecta
- Order: Lepidoptera
- Superfamily: Noctuoidea
- Family: Erebidae
- Subfamily: Arctiinae
- Genus: Saurita
- Species: S. pebasa

Binomial name
- Saurita pebasa Kaye, 1918

Species of moth

Saurita pebasa is a moth in the subfamily Arctiinae. It was described by William James Kaye in 1918. It is found in Peru.
