= Metalobosia ducalis =

Scientific classification
- Domain: Eukaryota
- Kingdom: Animalia
- Phylum: Arthropoda
- Class: Insecta
- Order: Lepidoptera
- Superfamily: Noctuoidea
- Family: Erebidae
- Subfamily: Arctiinae
- Genus: Metalobosia
- Species: M. ducalis

Binomial name
- Metalobosia ducalis Schaus, 1911

Species of moth

Metalobosia ducalis is a moth of the subfamily Arctiinae. It was described by William Schaus in 1911. It is found in Costa Rica.
