= Metalobosia diaxantha =

Scientific classification
- Kingdom: Animalia
- Phylum: Arthropoda
- Class: Insecta
- Order: Lepidoptera
- Superfamily: Noctuoidea
- Family: Erebidae
- Subfamily: Arctiinae
- Genus: Metalobosia
- Species: M. diaxantha

Binomial name
- Metalobosia diaxantha Hampson, 1914

Species of moth

Metalobosia diaxantha is a moth of the subfamily Arctiinae. It was described by George Hampson in 1914. It is found in Amazonas, Brazil.
