= Saurita sericea =

Scientific classification
- Domain: Eukaryota
- Kingdom: Animalia
- Phylum: Arthropoda
- Class: Insecta
- Order: Lepidoptera
- Superfamily: Noctuoidea
- Family: Erebidae
- Subfamily: Arctiinae
- Genus: Saurita
- Species: S. sericea

Binomial name
- Saurita sericea (Herrich-Schäffer, 1854)

Synonyms
- Laemocharis sericea Herrich-Schäffer, [1854]; Pseudosphenoptera demoanassa Druce, 1896

Species of moth

Saurita sericea is a moth in the subfamily Arctiinae. It was described by Gottlieb August Wilhelm Herrich-Schäffer in 1854. It is found in Panama and Rio de Janeiro, Brazil.
