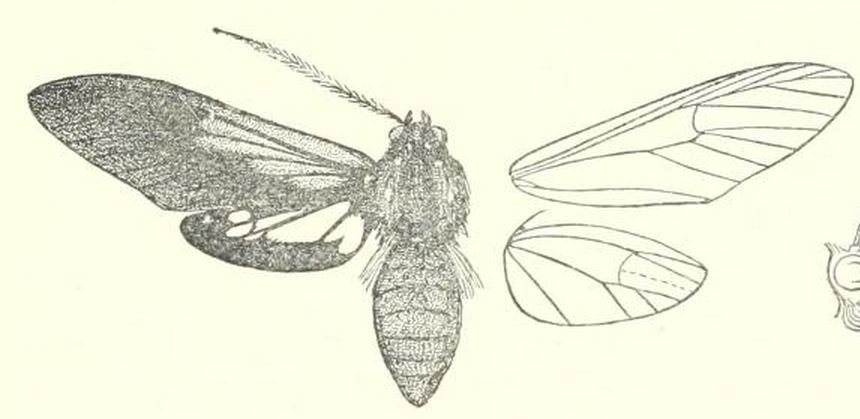

Scientific classification
- Kingdom: Animalia
- Phylum: Arthropoda
- Class: Insecta
- Order: Lepidoptera
- Superfamily: Noctuoidea
- Family: Erebidae
- Subfamily: Arctiinae
- Genus: Ixylasia
- Species: I. trogonoides

Binomial name
- Ixylasia trogonoides (Walker, 1864)

Synonyms
- Aclytia trogonoides Walker, [1865]

= Ixylasia trogonoides =

Species of moth

Ixylasia trogonoides is a moth of the subfamily Arctiinae. It was described by Francis Walker in 1864. It is found in Brazil.
