= Ichoria multigutta =

Scientific classification
- Domain: Eukaryota
- Kingdom: Animalia
- Phylum: Arthropoda
- Class: Insecta
- Order: Lepidoptera
- Superfamily: Noctuoidea
- Family: Erebidae
- Subfamily: Arctiinae
- Genus: Ichoria
- Species: I. multigutta

Binomial name
- Ichoria multigutta (Schaus, 1884)

Synonyms
- Laemocharis multigutta Schaus, 1894

Species of moth

Ichoria multigutta is a moth of the subfamily Arctiinae. It was described by Schaus in 1884. It is found in Venezuela.
