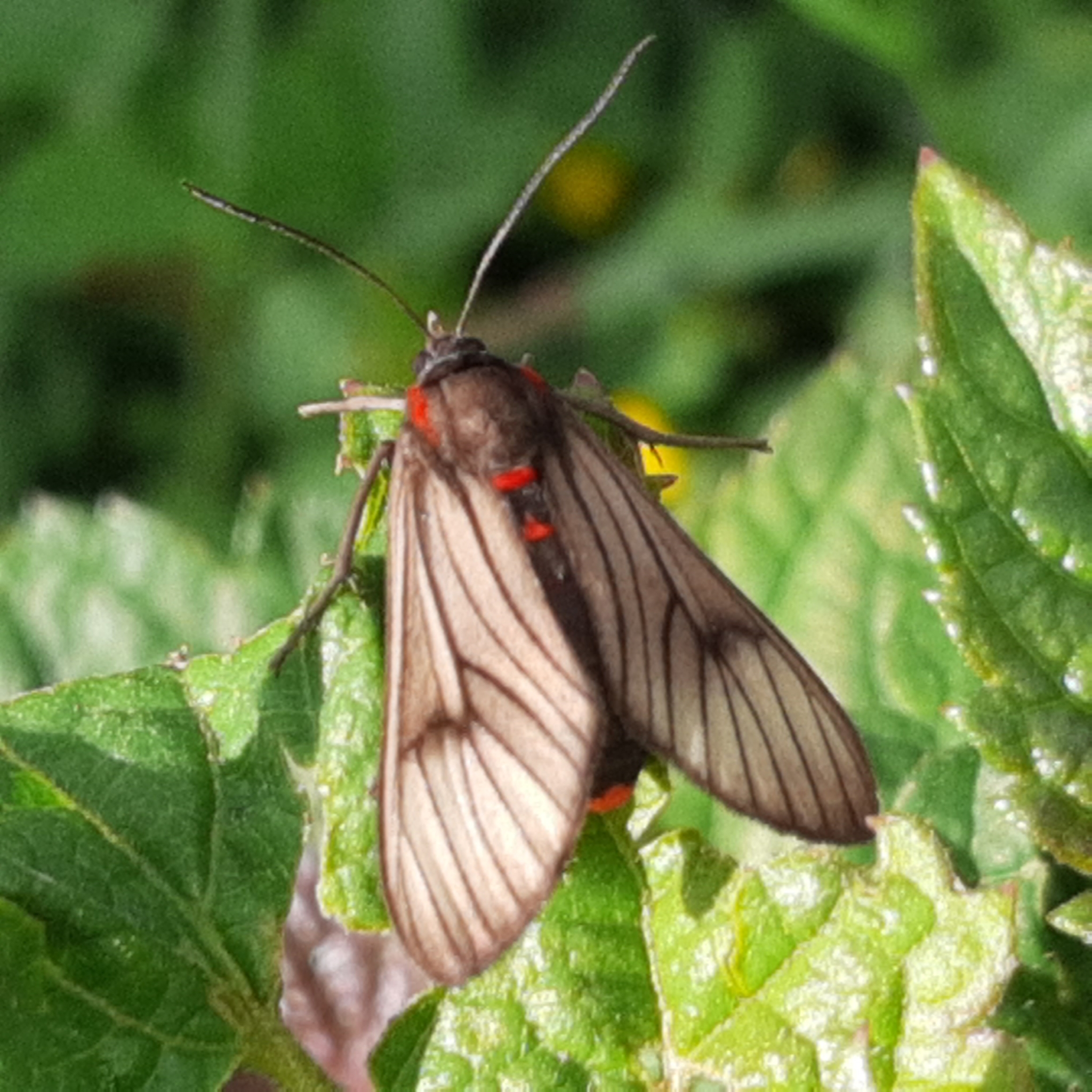

Scientific classification
- Kingdom: Animalia
- Phylum: Arthropoda
- Class: Insecta
- Order: Lepidoptera
- Superfamily: Noctuoidea
- Family: Erebidae
- Subfamily: Arctiinae
- Genus: Saurita
- Species: S. nigripalpia

Binomial name
- Saurita nigripalpia Hampson, 1898

= Saurita nigripalpia =

Species of moth

Saurita nigripalpia is a species of moth in the subfamily Arctiinae. It was described by George Hampson in 1898. It is found in Mexico and Costa Rica.
