= Euagra angelica =

Scientific classification
- Domain: Eukaryota
- Kingdom: Animalia
- Phylum: Arthropoda
- Class: Insecta
- Order: Lepidoptera
- Superfamily: Noctuoidea
- Family: Erebidae
- Subfamily: Arctiinae
- Genus: Euagra
- Species: E. angelica

Binomial name
- Euagra angelica Butler, 1876

Species of moth

Euagra angelica is a moth of the subfamily Arctiinae. It was described by Arthur Gardiner Butler in 1876. It is found in Colombia.
