= Saurita concisina =

Scientific classification
- Kingdom: Animalia
- Phylum: Arthropoda
- Class: Insecta
- Order: Lepidoptera
- Superfamily: Noctuoidea
- Family: Erebidae
- Subfamily: Arctiinae
- Genus: Saurita
- Species: S. concisina

Binomial name
- Saurita concisina Bryk, 1953

Species of moth

Saurita concisina is a moth in the subfamily Arctiinae. It was described by Felix Bryk in 1953. It is found in the Amazon region.
