= Saurita hilda =

Scientific classification
- Domain: Eukaryota
- Kingdom: Animalia
- Phylum: Arthropoda
- Class: Insecta
- Order: Lepidoptera
- Superfamily: Noctuoidea
- Family: Erebidae
- Subfamily: Arctiinae
- Genus: Saurita
- Species: S. hilda

Binomial name
- Saurita hilda H. Druce, 1906

Species of moth

Saurita hilda is a moth in the subfamily Arctiinae. It was described by Herbert Druce in 1906. It is found in Peru.
