= Saurita trichopteraeformis =

Scientific classification
- Domain: Eukaryota
- Kingdom: Animalia
- Phylum: Arthropoda
- Class: Insecta
- Order: Lepidoptera
- Superfamily: Noctuoidea
- Family: Erebidae
- Subfamily: Arctiinae
- Genus: Saurita
- Species: S. trichopteraeformis

Binomial name
- Saurita trichopteraeformis Jörgensen, 1913

Species of moth

Saurita trichopteraeformis is a moth in the subfamily Arctiinae. It was described by Peter Jörgensen in 1913. It is found in Argentina.
