= Histioea paulina =

Scientific classification
- Kingdom: Animalia
- Phylum: Arthropoda
- Clade: Pancrustacea
- Class: Insecta
- Order: Lepidoptera
- Superfamily: Noctuoidea
- Family: Erebidae
- Subfamily: Arctiinae
- Genus: Histioea
- Species: H. paulina

Binomial name
- Histioea paulina Walker, 1866

Species of moth

Histioea paulina is a moth of the subfamily Arctiinae. It was described by Francis Walker in 1866. It is found in São Paulo, Brazil.
