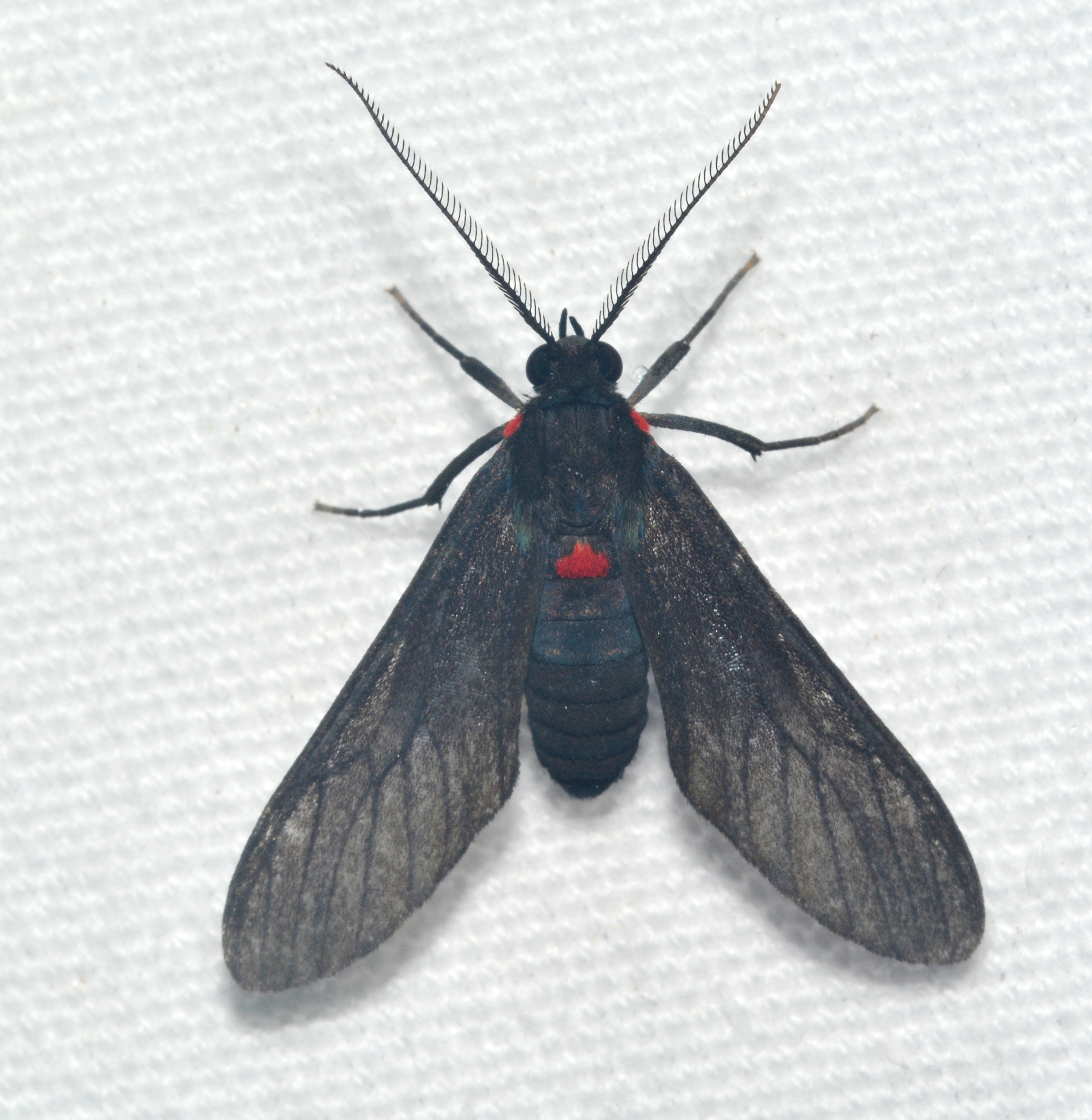

Scientific classification
- Domain: Eukaryota
- Kingdom: Animalia
- Phylum: Arthropoda
- Class: Insecta
- Order: Lepidoptera
- Superfamily: Noctuoidea
- Family: Erebidae
- Subfamily: Arctiinae
- Genus: Saurita
- Species: S. diffusa

Binomial name
- Saurita diffusa Schaus, 1911

= Saurita diffusa =

Species of moth

Saurita diffusa is a moth in the subfamily Arctiinae. It was described by William Schaus in 1911. It is found in Costa Rica.
