= Ichoria tricincta =

Scientific classification
- Domain: Eukaryota
- Kingdom: Animalia
- Phylum: Arthropoda
- Class: Insecta
- Order: Lepidoptera
- Superfamily: Noctuoidea
- Family: Erebidae
- Subfamily: Arctiinae
- Genus: Ichoria
- Species: I. tricincta

Binomial name
- Ichoria tricincta (Herrich-Schäffer, 1855)

Synonyms
- Laemocharis tricincta Herrich-Schäffer, [1855]

Species of moth

Ichoria tricincta is a moth of the subfamily Arctiinae. It was described by Gottlieb August Wilhelm Herrich-Schäffer in 1855. It is found in Rio de Janeiro, Brazil.
