= Saurita tetraema =

Scientific classification
- Kingdom: Animalia
- Phylum: Arthropoda
- Clade: Pancrustacea
- Class: Insecta
- Order: Lepidoptera
- Superfamily: Noctuoidea
- Family: Erebidae
- Subfamily: Arctiinae
- Genus: Saurita
- Species: S. tetraema

Binomial name
- Saurita tetraema Forbes, 1939

Species of moth

Saurita tetraema is a moth in the subfamily Arctiinae. It was described by William Trowbridge Merrifield Forbes in 1939. It is found on Barro Colorado Island in the middle of the Panama Canal.

Note: The Global Lepidoptera Names Index and Lepidoptera and Some Other Life Forms both give the authority as "Fabes", but the original description, linked below, was by William T. M. Forbes.
