= Ixylasia pyroproctis =

Scientific classification
- Domain: Eukaryota
- Kingdom: Animalia
- Phylum: Arthropoda
- Class: Insecta
- Order: Lepidoptera
- Superfamily: Noctuoidea
- Family: Erebidae
- Subfamily: Arctiinae
- Genus: Ixylasia
- Species: I. pyroproctis

Binomial name
- Ixylasia pyroproctis H. Druce, 1905

Synonyms
- Ixylasia kelleri Klages, 1906

Species of moth

Ixylasia pyroproctis is a moth of the subfamily Arctiinae. It was described by Herbert Druce in 1905. It is found in Venezuela.
