= Ichoria chalcomedusa =

Scientific classification
- Domain: Eukaryota
- Kingdom: Animalia
- Phylum: Arthropoda
- Class: Insecta
- Order: Lepidoptera
- Superfamily: Noctuoidea
- Family: Erebidae
- Subfamily: Arctiinae
- Genus: Ichoria
- Species: I. chalcomedusa

Binomial name
- Ichoria chalcomedusa H. Druce, 1893

Species of moth

Ichoria chalcomedusa is a moth of the subfamily Arctiinae. It was described by Herbert Druce in 1893. It is found in the Brazilian states of Santa Catarina and Paraná. It was named after the Greek mythological figure of Chalcomedusa, mother of Laertes.
