= Saurita lacteata =

Scientific classification
- Domain: Eukaryota
- Kingdom: Animalia
- Phylum: Arthropoda
- Class: Insecta
- Order: Lepidoptera
- Superfamily: Noctuoidea
- Family: Erebidae
- Subfamily: Arctiinae
- Genus: Saurita
- Species: S. lacteata

Binomial name
- Saurita lacteata (Butler, 1877)

Synonyms
- Dycladia lacteata Butler, 1877

Species of moth

Saurita lacteata is a moth in the subfamily Arctiinae. It was described by Arthur Gardiner Butler in 1877. It is found in the Amazon region.
