= Saurita mediorubra =

Scientific classification
- Domain: Eukaryota
- Kingdom: Animalia
- Phylum: Arthropoda
- Class: Insecta
- Order: Lepidoptera
- Superfamily: Noctuoidea
- Family: Erebidae
- Subfamily: Arctiinae
- Genus: Saurita
- Species: S. mediorubra

Binomial name
- Saurita mediorubra Kaye, 1911

Species of moth

Saurita mediorubra is a moth in the subfamily Arctiinae. It was described by William James Kaye in 1911. It is found in southern Brazil.

The wingspan is about 34 mm. The forewings are semihyaline (almost glass like), the apex broadly black with some dark scaling at the tornus. The hindwings, the apex and inner margin, with some dark scaling.
