= Apeplopoda improvisa =

Scientific classification
- Domain: Eukaryota
- Kingdom: Animalia
- Phylum: Arthropoda
- Class: Insecta
- Order: Lepidoptera
- Superfamily: Noctuoidea
- Family: Erebidae
- Subfamily: Arctiinae
- Genus: Apeplopoda
- Species: A. improvisa

Binomial name
- Apeplopoda improvisa (Schaus, 1912)

Synonyms
- Saurita improvisa Schaus, 1912

Species of moth

Apeplopoda improvisa is a moth of the family Erebidae. It was described by William Schaus in 1912. It found in Costa Rica.
