= Eriphioides ustulata =

Scientific classification
- Domain: Eukaryota
- Kingdom: Animalia
- Phylum: Arthropoda
- Class: Insecta
- Order: Lepidoptera
- Superfamily: Noctuoidea
- Family: Erebidae
- Subfamily: Arctiinae
- Genus: Eriphioides
- Species: E. ustulata

Binomial name
- Eriphioides ustulata (Felder, 1874)

Synonyms
- Eriphia ustulata Felder, 1874; Eriphioides rosenbergi Rothschild, 1912

Species of moth

Eriphioides ustulata is a moth of the subfamily Arctiinae. It was described by Baron Cajetan von Felder in 1874. It is found in Colombia.
