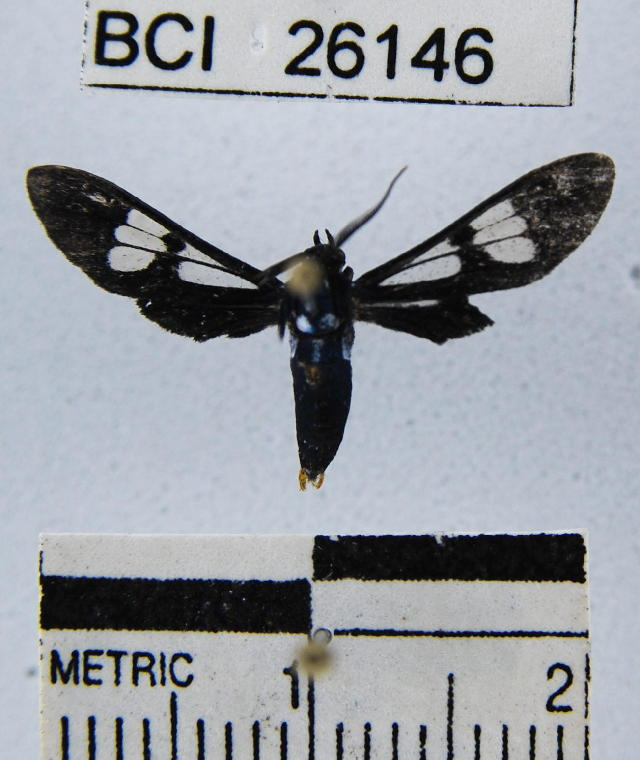

Scientific classification
- Domain: Eukaryota
- Kingdom: Animalia
- Phylum: Arthropoda
- Class: Insecta
- Order: Lepidoptera
- Superfamily: Noctuoidea
- Family: Erebidae
- Subfamily: Arctiinae
- Genus: Saurita
- Species: S. mora

Binomial name
- Saurita mora (H. Druce, 1897)

Synonyms
- Dycladia mora H. Druce, 1897

= Saurita mora =

Species of moth

Saurita mora is a moth in the subfamily Arctiinae. It was described by Herbert Druce in 1897. It is found in Panama.
