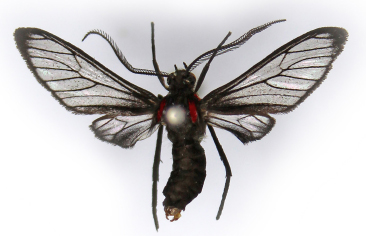
- Saurita Perspicua

Scientific classification
- Domain: Eukaryota
- Kingdom: Animalia
- Phylum: Arthropoda
- Class: Insecta
- Order: Lepidoptera
- Superfamily: Noctuoidea
- Family: Erebidae
- Subfamily: Arctiinae
- Genus: Saurita
- Species: S. perspicua

Binomial name
- Saurita perspicua Schaus, 1905

= Saurita perspicua =

Species of moth

Saurita perspicua is a moth in the subfamily Arctiinae. It was described by William Schaus in 1905. It is found in Trinidad.
