= Saurita triangulifera =

Scientific classification
- Domain: Eukaryota
- Kingdom: Animalia
- Phylum: Arthropoda
- Class: Insecta
- Order: Lepidoptera
- Superfamily: Noctuoidea
- Family: Erebidae
- Subfamily: Arctiinae
- Genus: Saurita
- Species: S. triangulifera

Binomial name
- Saurita triangulifera (H. Druce, 1898)

Synonyms
- Pseudosphenoptera triangulifera H. Druce, 1898

Species of moth

Saurita triangulifera is a moth in the subfamily Arctiinae. It was described by Herbert Druce in 1898. It is found in Rio de Janeiro, Brazil.
