= Narosodes metatroga =

Scientific classification
- Kingdom: Animalia
- Phylum: Arthropoda
- Class: Insecta
- Order: Lepidoptera
- Superfamily: Noctuoidea
- Family: Erebidae
- Subfamily: Arctiinae
- Genus: Narosodes
- Species: N. metatroga

Binomial name
- Narosodes metatroga Hampson, 1918

Species of moth

Narosodes metatroga is a moth of the family Erebidae. It was described by George Hampson in 1918. It is found on the Philippines.
