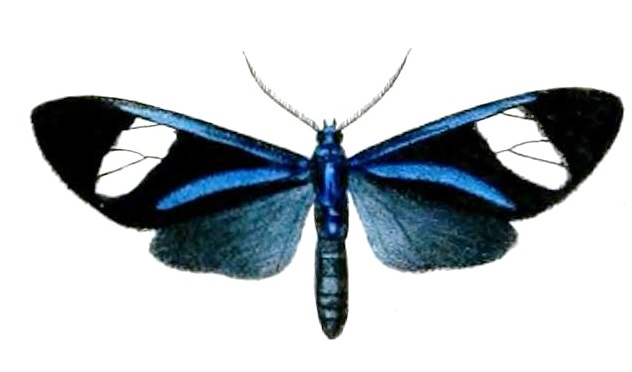
- Euagra latera

Scientific classification
- Kingdom: Animalia
- Phylum: Arthropoda
- Class: Insecta
- Order: Lepidoptera
- Superfamily: Noctuoidea
- Family: Erebidae
- Subfamily: Arctiinae
- Genus: Euagra; Walker, 1854

Synonyms
- Nepe Walker, 1854; Callagra Butler, 1876

= Euagra =

Genus of moths

Euagra is a genus of moths in the subfamily Arctiinae. The genus was erected by Francis Walker in 1854.

== Species ==
- Euagra angelica Butler, 1876 Colombia
- Euagra azurea (Walker, 1854) Brazil
- Euagra caerulea Dognin, 1891 Ecuador
- Euagra cerymica Druce, 1893 Panama
- Euagra chica Hampson, 1898 Bolivia
- Euagra coelestina (Stoll, [1781]) French Guiana, Bolivia, Brazil (Pará)
- Euagra delectans Schaus, 1911 Costa Rica
- Euagra fenestra (Walker, 1854) Brazil
- Euagra haemanthus (Walker, 1854) Mexico, Guatemala, Panama
- Euagra intercisa Butler, 1876 Venezuela
- Euagra klagesi Rothschild, 1912 Suriname
- Euagra latera (Druce, 1890) Ecuador, Brazil (São Paulo)
- Euagra monoscopa Kaye, 1919 Ecuador
- Euagra perpasta Draudt, 1917 Colombia
- Euagra seraphica Draudt, 1917 Colombia
- Euagra splendida (Butler, 1876) Brazil (Santa Catarina)
