= Saurita tipulina =

Scientific classification
- Kingdom: Animalia
- Phylum: Arthropoda
- Clade: Pancrustacea
- Class: Insecta
- Order: Lepidoptera
- Superfamily: Noctuoidea
- Family: Erebidae
- Subfamily: Arctiinae
- Genus: Saurita
- Species: S. tipulina

Binomial name
- Saurita tipulina (Hübner, 1812)

Synonyms
- Glaucopis tipulina Hübner, [1812]; Glaucopis bibia Walker, 1854

Species of moth

Saurita tipulina is a moth in the subfamily Arctiinae. It was described by Jacob Hübner in 1812. It is found in Guatemala, Panama and Brazil (Santa Catarina, Espírito Santo, Pará).
