= Metalobosia =

Scientific classification
- Kingdom: Animalia
- Phylum: Arthropoda
- Class: Insecta
- Order: Lepidoptera
- Superfamily: Noctuoidea
- Family: Erebidae
- Subfamily: Arctiinae
- Tribe: Lithosiini
- Genus: Metalobosia; Hampson, 1900

Genus of moths

Metalobosia is a genus of moths in the subfamily Arctiinae. The genus was erected by George Hampson in 1900.

== Species ==
- Metalobosia anitras Dognin, 1891
- Metalobosia atriloba Dognin, 1912
- Metalobosia chalcoela Dognin, 1912
- Metalobosia cuprea Schaus, 1896
- Metalobosia cupreata Reich, 1933
- Metalobosia diaxantha Hampson, 1914
- Metalobosia ducalis Schaus, 1911
- Metalobosia elis Druce, 1885
- Metalobosia holophaea Dognin, 1912
- Metalobosia invarda Schaus, 1905
- Metalobosia postflavida Draudt, 1918
- Metalobosia postrubida Rothschild, 1913
- Metalobosia similis Draudt, 1918
- Metalobosia varda Schaus, 1896
