= Euagra coelestina =

Scientific classification
- Domain: Eukaryota
- Kingdom: Animalia
- Phylum: Arthropoda
- Class: Insecta
- Order: Lepidoptera
- Superfamily: Noctuoidea
- Family: Erebidae
- Subfamily: Arctiinae
- Genus: Euagra
- Species: E. coelestina

Binomial name
- Euagra coelestina Stoll, [1781]

Synonyms
- Bombyx coelestina Stoll, [1781]; Dioptis interclusa Walker, 1854

Species of moth

Euagra coelestina is a moth of the subfamily Arctiinae. It was described by Caspar Stoll in 1781. It is found in Suriname and the Brazilian state of Pará.
