= Saurita astyoche =

Scientific classification
- Domain: Eukaryota
- Kingdom: Animalia
- Phylum: Arthropoda
- Class: Insecta
- Order: Lepidoptera
- Superfamily: Noctuoidea
- Family: Erebidae
- Subfamily: Arctiinae
- Genus: Saurita
- Species: S. astyoche

Binomial name
- Saurita astyoche (Geyer, 1832)

Synonyms
- Euchromia astyoche Geyer, 1832

Species of moth

Saurita astyoche is a moth in the subfamily Arctiinae. It was described by Carl Geyer in 1832. It is found in Suriname and Rio Grande do Sul, Brazil.
