= Euagra splendida =

Scientific classification
- Domain: Eukaryota
- Kingdom: Animalia
- Phylum: Arthropoda
- Class: Insecta
- Order: Lepidoptera
- Superfamily: Noctuoidea
- Family: Erebidae
- Subfamily: Arctiinae
- Genus: Euagra
- Species: E. splendida

Binomial name
- Euagra splendida (Butler, 1876)

Synonyms
- Callagra splendida Butler, 1876

Species of moth

Euagra splendida is a moth of the subfamily Arctiinae. It was described by Arthur Gardiner Butler in 1876. It is found in Brazil.
