= Saurita lacteipars =

Scientific classification
- Domain: Eukaryota
- Kingdom: Animalia
- Phylum: Arthropoda
- Class: Insecta
- Order: Lepidoptera
- Superfamily: Noctuoidea
- Family: Erebidae
- Subfamily: Arctiinae
- Genus: Saurita
- Species: S. lacteipars

Binomial name
- Saurita lacteipars Dognin, 1914

Synonyms
- Saurita anthracina Draudt, 1915

Species of moth

Saurita lacteipars is a moth in the subfamily Arctiinae. It was described by Paul Dognin in 1914. It is found in Colombia and Venezuela.
