= Saurita geralda =

Scientific classification
- Domain: Eukaryota
- Kingdom: Animalia
- Phylum: Arthropoda
- Class: Insecta
- Order: Lepidoptera
- Superfamily: Noctuoidea
- Family: Erebidae
- Subfamily: Arctiinae
- Genus: Saurita
- Species: S. geralda

Binomial name
- Saurita geralda Schaus, 1924

Species of moth

Saurita geralda is a moth in the subfamily Arctiinae. It was described by William Schaus in 1924. It is found in Venezuela.
