= Ichoria demona =

Scientific classification
- Domain: Eukaryota
- Kingdom: Animalia
- Phylum: Arthropoda
- Class: Insecta
- Order: Lepidoptera
- Superfamily: Noctuoidea
- Family: Erebidae
- Subfamily: Arctiinae
- Genus: Ichoria
- Species: I. demona

Binomial name
- Ichoria demona H. Druce, 1897

Synonyms
- Ichoria demona f. orizabena Draudt, 1915

Species of moth

Ichoria demona is a moth of the subfamily Arctiinae. It was described by Herbert Druce in 1897. It is found in Mexico.
