= Ptychotricos zeus =

Scientific classification
- Domain: Eukaryota
- Kingdom: Animalia
- Phylum: Arthropoda
- Class: Insecta
- Order: Lepidoptera
- Superfamily: Noctuoidea
- Family: Erebidae
- Subfamily: Arctiinae
- Genus: Ptychotricos
- Species: P. zeus

Binomial name
- Ptychotricos zeus Schaus, 1894

Species of moth

Ptychotricos zeus is a moth in the subfamily Arctiinae. It was described by William Schaus in 1894. It is found in Venezuela.
