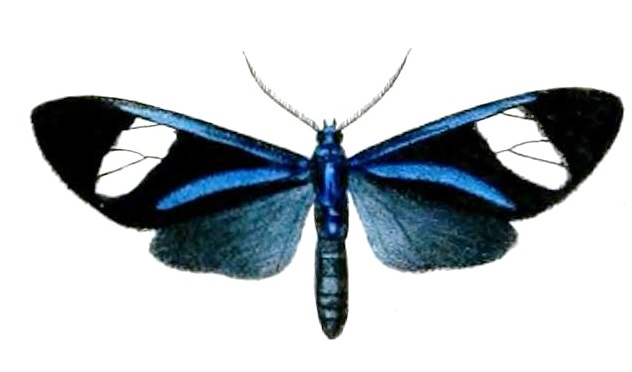

Scientific classification
- Domain: Eukaryota
- Kingdom: Animalia
- Phylum: Arthropoda
- Class: Insecta
- Order: Lepidoptera
- Superfamily: Noctuoidea
- Family: Erebidae
- Subfamily: Arctiinae
- Genus: Euagra
- Species: E. latera

Binomial name
- Euagra latera (H. Druce, 1890)

Synonyms
- Erchia latera H. Druce, 1890

= Euagra latera =

Species of moth

Euagra latera is a moth of the subfamily Arctiinae. It was described by Herbert Druce in 1890. It is found in Ecuador and São Paulo, Brazil.
