= Histioea maon =

Scientific classification
- Kingdom: Animalia
- Phylum: Arthropoda
- Clade: Pancrustacea
- Class: Insecta
- Order: Lepidoptera
- Superfamily: Noctuoidea
- Family: Erebidae
- Subfamily: Arctiinae
- Genus: Histioea
- Species: H. maon

Binomial name
- Histioea maon H. Druce, 1896

Synonyms
- Histiaea maon

Species of moth

Histioea maon is a moth of the subfamily Arctiinae. It was described by Herbert Druce in 1896. It is found in Bolivia.
