= Saurita nox =

Scientific classification
- Domain: Eukaryota
- Kingdom: Animalia
- Phylum: Arthropoda
- Class: Insecta
- Order: Lepidoptera
- Superfamily: Noctuoidea
- Family: Erebidae
- Subfamily: Arctiinae
- Genus: Saurita
- Species: S. nox

Binomial name
- Saurita nox (H. Druce, 1896)

Synonyms
- Laemocharis nox H. Druce, 1896

Species of moth

Saurita nox is a moth in the subfamily Arctiinae. It was described by Herbert Druce in 1896. It is found in Honduras and Venezuela.
