= Poecilosoma vespoides =

Scientific classification
- Kingdom: Animalia
- Phylum: Arthropoda
- Clade: Pancrustacea
- Class: Insecta
- Order: Lepidoptera
- Superfamily: Noctuoidea
- Family: Erebidae
- Subfamily: Arctiinae
- Genus: Poecilosoma
- Species: P. vespoides

Binomial name
- Poecilosoma vespoides Schaus, 1905

Species of moth

Poecilosoma vespoides is a moth in the subfamily Arctiinae. It was described by William Schaus in 1905. It is found in Peru.
