= Saurita phoenicosticta =

Scientific classification
- Kingdom: Animalia
- Phylum: Arthropoda
- Class: Insecta
- Order: Lepidoptera
- Superfamily: Noctuoidea
- Family: Erebidae
- Subfamily: Arctiinae
- Genus: Saurita
- Species: S. phoenicosticta

Binomial name
- Saurita phoenicosticta Hampson, 1898

Species of moth

Saurita phoenicosticta is a moth in the subfamily Arctiinae. It was described by George Hampson in 1898. It is found in Guatemala.
