= Metalobosia invarda =

Scientific classification
- Domain: Eukaryota
- Kingdom: Animalia
- Phylum: Arthropoda
- Class: Insecta
- Order: Lepidoptera
- Superfamily: Noctuoidea
- Family: Erebidae
- Subfamily: Arctiinae
- Genus: Metalobosia
- Species: M. invarda

Binomial name
- Metalobosia invarda Schaus, 1905

Species of moth

Metalobosia invarda is a moth of the subfamily Arctiinae. It was described by Schaus in 1905. It is found in French Guiana.
