= Eriphioides fastidiosa =

Scientific classification
- Kingdom: Animalia
- Phylum: Arthropoda
- Class: Insecta
- Order: Lepidoptera
- Superfamily: Noctuoidea
- Family: Erebidae
- Subfamily: Arctiinae
- Genus: Eriphioides
- Species: E. fastidiosa

Binomial name
- Eriphioides fastidiosa Dyar, 1916

Species of moth

Eriphioides fastidiosa is a moth of the subfamily Arctiinae. It was described by Harrison Gray Dyar Jr. in 1916. It is found in Central America.
