= Cercocladia =

Scientific classification
- Domain: Eukaryota
- Kingdom: Animalia
- Phylum: Arthropoda
- Class: Insecta
- Order: Lepidoptera
- Superfamily: Noctuoidea
- Family: Erebidae
- Subfamily: Arctiinae
- Genus: Cercocladia; Draudt, 1915

Genus of moths

Cercocladia is a genus of moths in the subfamily Arctiinae.

== Species ==
- Cercocladia novicia Draudt, 1915
- Cercocladia seitzi Draudt, 1931
