= Histioea imaon =

Scientific classification
- Kingdom: Animalia
- Phylum: Arthropoda
- Clade: Pancrustacea
- Class: Insecta
- Order: Lepidoptera
- Superfamily: Noctuoidea
- Family: Erebidae
- Subfamily: Arctiinae
- Genus: Histioea
- Species: H. imaon

Binomial name
- Histioea imaon Hampson, 1898

Species of moth

Histioea imaon is a moth of the subfamily Arctiinae. It was described by George Hampson in 1898. It is found in the Amazon region.
