= Eriphioides =

Scientific classification
- Kingdom: Animalia
- Phylum: Arthropoda
- Class: Insecta
- Order: Lepidoptera
- Superfamily: Noctuoidea
- Family: Erebidae
- Subfamily: Arctiinae
- Genus: Eriphioides; Kirby, 1892

Genus of moths

Eriphioides is a genus of moths in the subfamily Arctiinae. The genus was described by William Forsell Kirby in 1892.

== Species ==
- Eriphioides ecuadoriensis Draudt, 1915
- Eriphioides fastidiosa Dyar, 1916
- Eriphioides phaeoptera Dognin, 1912
- Eriphioides purpurinus Dognin, 1923
- Eriphioides simplex Rothschild, 1912
- Eriphioides surinamensis Möschler, 1877
- Eriphioides tractipennis Butler, 1876
- Eriphioides ustulata Felder, 1869
