= Histioea glaucozona =

Scientific classification
- Kingdom: Animalia
- Phylum: Arthropoda
- Clade: Pancrustacea
- Class: Insecta
- Order: Lepidoptera
- Superfamily: Noctuoidea
- Family: Erebidae
- Subfamily: Arctiinae
- Genus: Histioea
- Species: H. glaucozona

Binomial name
- Histioea glaucozona (H. Druce, 1898)

Synonyms
- Histiaea glaucozona H. Druce, 1898

Species of moth

Histioea glaucozona is a moth of the subfamily Arctiinae. It was described by Herbert Druce in 1898. It is found in the Amazon region.
