= Histioea paraensis =

Scientific classification
- Kingdom: Animalia
- Phylum: Arthropoda
- Clade: Pancrustacea
- Class: Insecta
- Order: Lepidoptera
- Superfamily: Noctuoidea
- Family: Erebidae
- Subfamily: Arctiinae
- Genus: Histioea
- Species: H. paraensis

Binomial name
- Histioea paraensis Machado Jr. & Rego Barros, 1971

Species of moth

Histioea paraensis is a moth of the subfamily Arctiinae. It was described by Joaquim Pereira Machado Jr. and Alfredo Rei do Régo Barros in 1971. It is found in Brazil.
