= Euagra delectans =

Scientific classification
- Domain: Eukaryota
- Kingdom: Animalia
- Phylum: Arthropoda
- Class: Insecta
- Order: Lepidoptera
- Superfamily: Noctuoidea
- Family: Erebidae
- Subfamily: Arctiinae
- Genus: Euagra
- Species: E. delectans

Binomial name
- Euagra delectans Schaus, 1911

Species of moth

Euagra delectans is a moth of the subfamily Arctiinae. It was described by William Schaus in 1911. It is found in Costa Rica.
