= Lirimiris truncata =

Scientific classification
- Kingdom: Animalia
- Phylum: Arthropoda
- Clade: Pancrustacea
- Class: Insecta
- Order: Lepidoptera
- Superfamily: Noctuoidea
- Family: Notodontidae
- Genus: Lirimiris
- Species: L. truncata

Binomial name
- Lirimiris truncata (Herrich-Schäffer, 1856)

Species of insect

Lirimiris truncata is a species of moth in the family Notodontidae (the prominents). It was first described by Gottlieb August Wilhelm Herrich-Schäffer in 1856 and it is found in North America.
