= Ixylasia semivitreata =

Scientific classification
- Kingdom: Animalia
- Phylum: Arthropoda
- Class: Insecta
- Order: Lepidoptera
- Superfamily: Noctuoidea
- Family: Erebidae
- Subfamily: Arctiinae
- Genus: Ixylasia
- Species: I. semivitreata

Binomial name
- Ixylasia semivitreata Hampson, 1905

Synonyms
- Autochloris almon Hampson, 1898 (nec. Cramer, [1779])

Species of moth

Ixylasia semivitreata is a moth of the subfamily Arctiinae. It was described by George Hampson in 1905. It is found in the Brazilian states of Rio de Janeiro and Santa Catarina.
