= Eriphioides tractipennis =

Scientific classification
- Domain: Eukaryota
- Kingdom: Animalia
- Phylum: Arthropoda
- Class: Insecta
- Order: Lepidoptera
- Superfamily: Noctuoidea
- Family: Erebidae
- Subfamily: Arctiinae
- Genus: Eriphioides
- Species: E. tractipennis

Binomial name
- Eriphioides tractipennis (Butler, 1876)

Synonyms
- Eriphia tractipennis Butler, 1876; Eriphioides tractipennis f. columbina Dyar, 1899

Species of moth

Eriphioides tractipennis is a moth of the subfamily Arctiinae. It was described by Arthur Gardiner Butler in 1876. It is found in Nicaragua, Guatemala and Panama.
