= Saurita mosca =

Scientific classification
- Domain: Eukaryota
- Kingdom: Animalia
- Phylum: Arthropoda
- Class: Insecta
- Order: Lepidoptera
- Superfamily: Noctuoidea
- Family: Erebidae
- Subfamily: Arctiinae
- Genus: Saurita
- Species: S. mosca

Binomial name
- Saurita mosca (Dognin, 1897)

Synonyms
- Laemocharis mosca Dognin, 1897

Species of moth

Saurita mosca is a moth in the subfamily Arctiinae. It was described by Paul Dognin in 1897. It is found in Ecuador.
