= Ichoria semiopaca =

Scientific classification
- Domain: Eukaryota
- Kingdom: Animalia
- Phylum: Arthropoda
- Class: Insecta
- Order: Lepidoptera
- Superfamily: Noctuoidea
- Family: Erebidae
- Subfamily: Arctiinae
- Genus: Ichoria
- Species: I. semiopaca

Binomial name
- Ichoria semiopaca Dognin, 1906

Species of moth

Ichoria semiopaca is a moth of the subfamily Arctiinae. It was described by Paul Dognin in 1906. It is found in Brazil (São Paulo).
