= Poecilosoma eusebia =

Scientific classification
- Kingdom: Animalia
- Phylum: Arthropoda
- Clade: Pancrustacea
- Class: Insecta
- Order: Lepidoptera
- Superfamily: Noctuoidea
- Family: Erebidae
- Subfamily: Arctiinae
- Genus: Poecilosoma
- Species: P. eusebia

Binomial name
- Poecilosoma eusebia (H. Druce, 1883)

Synonyms
- Isanthrene eusebia H. Druce, 1883; Gymnelia eusebia (H. Druce, 1883)

Species of moth

Poecilosoma eusebia is a moth of the subfamily Arctiinae. It was described by Herbert Druce in 1883. It is found in Ecuador.
