= Eriphioides simplex =

Scientific classification
- Kingdom: Animalia
- Phylum: Arthropoda
- Class: Insecta
- Order: Lepidoptera
- Superfamily: Noctuoidea
- Family: Erebidae
- Subfamily: Arctiinae
- Genus: Eriphioides
- Species: E. simplex

Binomial name
- Eriphioides simplex (Rothschild, 1912)

Synonyms
- Ceramidia simplex Rothschild, 1912

Species of moth

Eriphioides simplex is a moth of the subfamily Arctiinae. It was described by Rothschild in 1912. It is found in Ecuador.
