= Histioea bellatrix =

Scientific classification
- Kingdom: Animalia
- Phylum: Arthropoda
- Class: Insecta
- Order: Lepidoptera
- Superfamily: Noctuoidea
- Family: Erebidae
- Subfamily: Arctiinae
- Genus: Histioea
- Species: H. bellatrix

Binomial name
- Histioea bellatrix (Walker, 1854)

Synonyms
- Euchromia bellatrix Walker, 1854; Histioea colombiae Butler, 1876; Histioea bellatrix f. aucta Draudt, 1915

Species of moth

Histioea bellatrix is a moth of the subfamily Arctiinae. It was described by Francis Walker in 1854. It is found in Colombia and Venezuela.
