= Metalobosia anitras =

Scientific classification
- Domain: Eukaryota
- Kingdom: Animalia
- Phylum: Arthropoda
- Class: Insecta
- Order: Lepidoptera
- Superfamily: Noctuoidea
- Family: Erebidae
- Subfamily: Arctiinae
- Genus: Metalobosia
- Species: M. anitras

Binomial name
- Metalobosia anitras (Dognin, 1891)

Synonyms
- Odozana anitras Dognin, 1891; Lithoproctis postcaerulescens Rothschild, 1913

Species of moth

Metalobosia anitras is a moth of the subfamily Arctiinae. It was described by Paul Dognin in 1891. It is found in Ecuador.
