= Metalobosia cupreata =

Scientific classification
- Domain: Eukaryota
- Kingdom: Animalia
- Phylum: Arthropoda
- Class: Insecta
- Order: Lepidoptera
- Superfamily: Noctuoidea
- Family: Erebidae
- Subfamily: Arctiinae
- Genus: Metalobosia
- Species: M. cupreata

Binomial name
- Metalobosia cupreata (Reich, 1933)

Synonyms
- Odozana cupreata Reich, 1933

Species of moth

Metalobosia cupreata is a moth of the subfamily Arctiinae. It was described by Reich in 1933. It is found in Brazil.
