= Ichoria =

Scientific classification
- Domain: Eukaryota
- Kingdom: Animalia
- Phylum: Arthropoda
- Class: Insecta
- Order: Lepidoptera
- Superfamily: Noctuoidea
- Family: Erebidae
- Subfamily: Arctiinae
- Genus: Ichoria; Butler, 1876

Genus of moths

Ichoria is a genus of moths in the subfamily Arctiinae. The genus was erected by Arthur Gardiner Butler in 1876.

== Species ==
- Ichoria chalcomedusa Druce, 1893
- Ichoria chrostosomides Schaus, 1905
- Ichoria demona Druce, 1897
- Ichoria improcera Draudt, 1915
- Ichoria maura Draudt, 1915
- Ichoria mexicana Draudt, 1931
- Ichoria multigutta Schaus, 1884
- Ichoria pyrrhonota Zerny, 1931
- Ichoria quadrigutta Walker, 1854
- Ichoria semiopaca Dognin, 1906
- Ichoria thyrassia Zerny, 1931
- Ichoria tricincta Herrich-Schäffer, 1855
- Ichoria virescens Dognin, 1914
