= Narosodes rufocostalis =

Scientific classification
- Domain: Eukaryota
- Kingdom: Animalia
- Phylum: Arthropoda
- Class: Insecta
- Order: Lepidoptera
- Superfamily: Noctuoidea
- Family: Erebidae
- Subfamily: Arctiinae
- Genus: Narosodes
- Species: N. rufocostalis

Binomial name
- Narosodes rufocostalis Rothschild, 1912

Synonyms
- Macaduma rufocostalis Rothschild, 1912

Species of moth

Narosodes rufocostalis is a moth of the family Erebidae. It was described by Walter Rothschild in 1912. It is found in New Guinea.
