= Saurita tristissima =

Scientific classification
- Domain: Eukaryota
- Kingdom: Animalia
- Phylum: Arthropoda
- Class: Insecta
- Order: Lepidoptera
- Superfamily: Noctuoidea
- Family: Erebidae
- Subfamily: Arctiinae
- Genus: Saurita
- Species: S. tristissima

Binomial name
- Saurita tristissima (Perty, 1834)

Synonyms
- Glaucopis tristissima Perty, 1834

Species of moth

Saurita tristissima is a moth in the subfamily Arctiinae. It was described by Perty in 1834. It is found in the Amazon region.
