= Eriphioides phaeoptera =

Scientific classification
- Domain: Eukaryota
- Kingdom: Animalia
- Phylum: Arthropoda
- Class: Insecta
- Order: Lepidoptera
- Superfamily: Noctuoidea
- Family: Erebidae
- Subfamily: Arctiinae
- Genus: Eriphioides
- Species: E. phaeoptera

Binomial name
- Eriphioides phaeoptera Dognin, 1912

Species of moth

Eriphioides phaeoptera is a moth of the subfamily Arctiinae. It was described by Paul Dognin in 1912. It is found in Colombia.
