= Histioea =

Scientific classification
- Kingdom: Animalia
- Phylum: Arthropoda
- Class: Insecta
- Order: Lepidoptera
- Superfamily: Noctuoidea
- Family: Erebidae
- Subfamily: Arctiinae
- Genus: Histioea; Walker, 1854

Synonyms
- Bodosa Machado & Rego Barros, 1969

Genus of moths

Histoea is a genus of moths in the subfamily Arctiinae. The genus was erected by Francis Walker in 1854.

== Species ==
- Histioea amazonica Butler, 1876
- Histioea bellatrix Walker, 1854
- Histioea boliviana Druce, 1890
- Histioea cepheus Cramer, 1779
- Histioea excreta Draudt, 1915
- Histioea falerina Druce, 1907
- Histioea glaucozona Druce, 1898
- Histioea hoffmannsi Rothschild, 1911
- Histioea imaon Hampson, 1898
- Histioea maon Druce, 1896
- Histioea meldolae Butler, 1876
- Histioea paraensis Machado Jnr. & Rego Barros, 1971
- Histioea paulina Walker, 1866
- Histioea peruana Gaede, 1926
- Histioea peruviana Draudt, 1915
- Histioea proserpina Hübner, 1827
- Histioea tina (Walker, 1854)
