= Ptychotricos fenestrifer =

Scientific classification
- Domain: Eukaryota
- Kingdom: Animalia
- Phylum: Arthropoda
- Class: Insecta
- Order: Lepidoptera
- Superfamily: Noctuoidea
- Family: Erebidae
- Subfamily: Arctiinae
- Genus: Ptychotricos
- Species: P. fenestrifer

Binomial name
- Ptychotricos fenestrifer (Zerny, 1931)

Synonyms
- Ptychotrichos fenestrifer Zerny, 1931

Species of moth

Ptychotricos fenestrifer is a moth in the subfamily Arctiinae. It was described by Zerny in 1931. It is found in Brazil.
