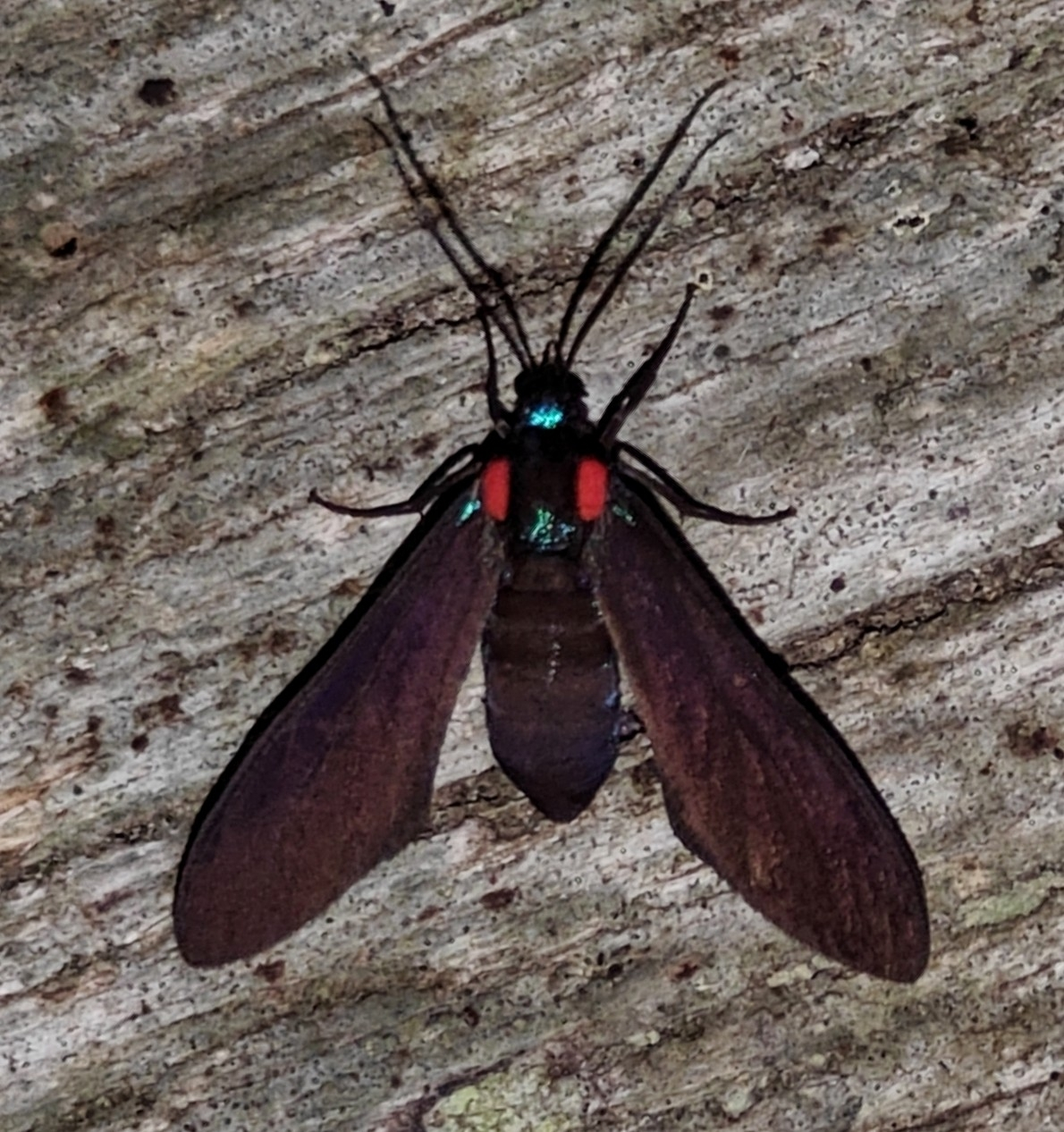

Scientific classification
- Kingdom: Animalia
- Phylum: Arthropoda
- Clade: Pancrustacea
- Class: Insecta
- Order: Lepidoptera
- Superfamily: Noctuoidea
- Family: Erebidae
- Subfamily: Arctiinae
- Genus: Saurita
- Species: S. submacula

Binomial name
- Saurita submacula Schaus, 1911

= Saurita submacula =

Species of moth

Saurita submacula is a species of moth in the subfamily Arctiinae. It was first described by William Schaus in 1911. It is found in Costa Rica.
