= Saurita lasiphlebia =

Scientific classification
- Domain: Eukaryota
- Kingdom: Animalia
- Phylum: Arthropoda
- Class: Insecta
- Order: Lepidoptera
- Superfamily: Noctuoidea
- Family: Erebidae
- Subfamily: Arctiinae
- Genus: Saurita
- Species: S. lasiphlebia

Binomial name
- Saurita lasiphlebia Dognin, 1906

Synonyms
- Saurita culicina Oberthur

Species of moth

Saurita lasiphlebia is a moth in the subfamily Arctiinae. It was described by Paul Dognin in 1906. It is found in Peru.
