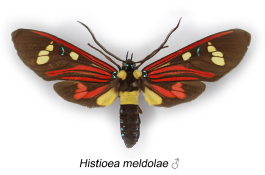
- Histioea meldolae

Scientific classification
- Kingdom: Animalia
- Phylum: Arthropoda
- Clade: Pancrustacea
- Class: Insecta
- Order: Lepidoptera
- Superfamily: Noctuoidea
- Family: Erebidae
- Subfamily: Arctiinae
- Genus: Histioea
- Species: H. meldolae

Binomial name
- Histioea meldolae Butler, 1876

= Histioea meldolae =

Species of moth

Histioea meldolae is a moth of the subfamily Arctiinae. It was described by Arthur Gardiner Butler in 1876. It is found in Panama, Venezuela and Trinidad.
