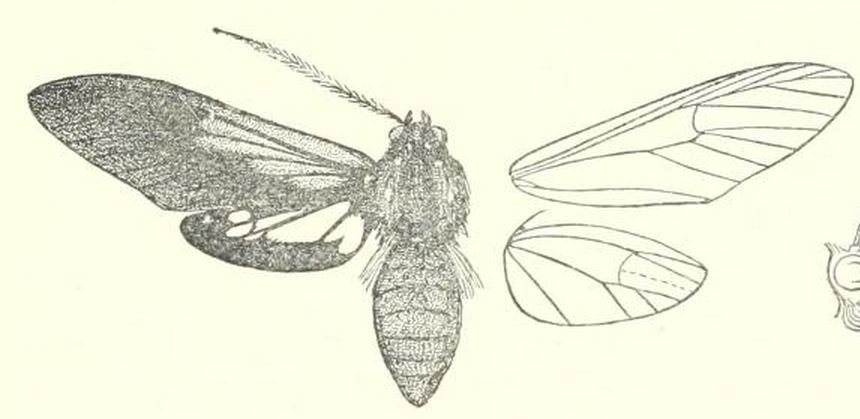
- Ixylasia trogonoides

Scientific classification
- Domain: Eukaryota
- Kingdom: Animalia
- Phylum: Arthropoda
- Class: Insecta
- Order: Lepidoptera
- Superfamily: Noctuoidea
- Family: Erebidae
- Subfamily: Arctiinae
- Genus: Ixylasia; Butler, 1876

= Ixylasia =

Genus of moths

Ixylasia is a genus of moths in the subfamily Arctiinae. The genus was erected by Arthur Gardiner Butler in 1876.

== Species ==
- Ixylasia pyroproctis Druce, 1905
- Ixylasia schausi Druce, 1896
- Ixylasia semivitreata Hampson, 1905
- Ixylasia trogon Draudt, 1917
- Ixylasia trogonoides Walker, 1864
