= Histioea falerina =

Scientific classification
- Kingdom: Animalia
- Phylum: Arthropoda
- Clade: Pancrustacea
- Class: Insecta
- Order: Lepidoptera
- Superfamily: Noctuoidea
- Family: Erebidae
- Subfamily: Arctiinae
- Genus: Histioea
- Species: H. falerina

Binomial name
- Histioea falerina H. Druce, 1907

Species of moth

Histioea falerina is a moth of the subfamily Arctiinae. It was described by Herbert Druce in 1907. It is found in Peru.
