= Saurita tricolor =

Scientific classification
- Domain: Eukaryota
- Kingdom: Animalia
- Phylum: Arthropoda
- Class: Insecta
- Order: Lepidoptera
- Superfamily: Noctuoidea
- Family: Erebidae
- Subfamily: Arctiinae
- Genus: Saurita
- Species: S. tricolor

Binomial name
- Saurita tricolor Schaus, 1905

Species of moth

Saurita tricolor is a moth in the subfamily Arctiinae. It was described by William Schaus in 1905. It is found in French Guiana.
