= Poecilosoma marginata =

Scientific classification
- Kingdom: Animalia
- Phylum: Arthropoda
- Clade: Pancrustacea
- Class: Insecta
- Order: Lepidoptera
- Superfamily: Noctuoidea
- Family: Erebidae
- Subfamily: Arctiinae
- Genus: Poecilosoma
- Species: P. marginata

Binomial name
- Poecilosoma marginata (Walker, 1856)

Synonyms
- Cosmosoma marginata Walker, 1856; Cosmosoma marginatum; Poecilosoma marginatum

Species of moth

Poecilosoma marginata is a moth in the subfamily Arctiinae. It was described by Francis Walker in 1856. It is found in the Amazon region.
