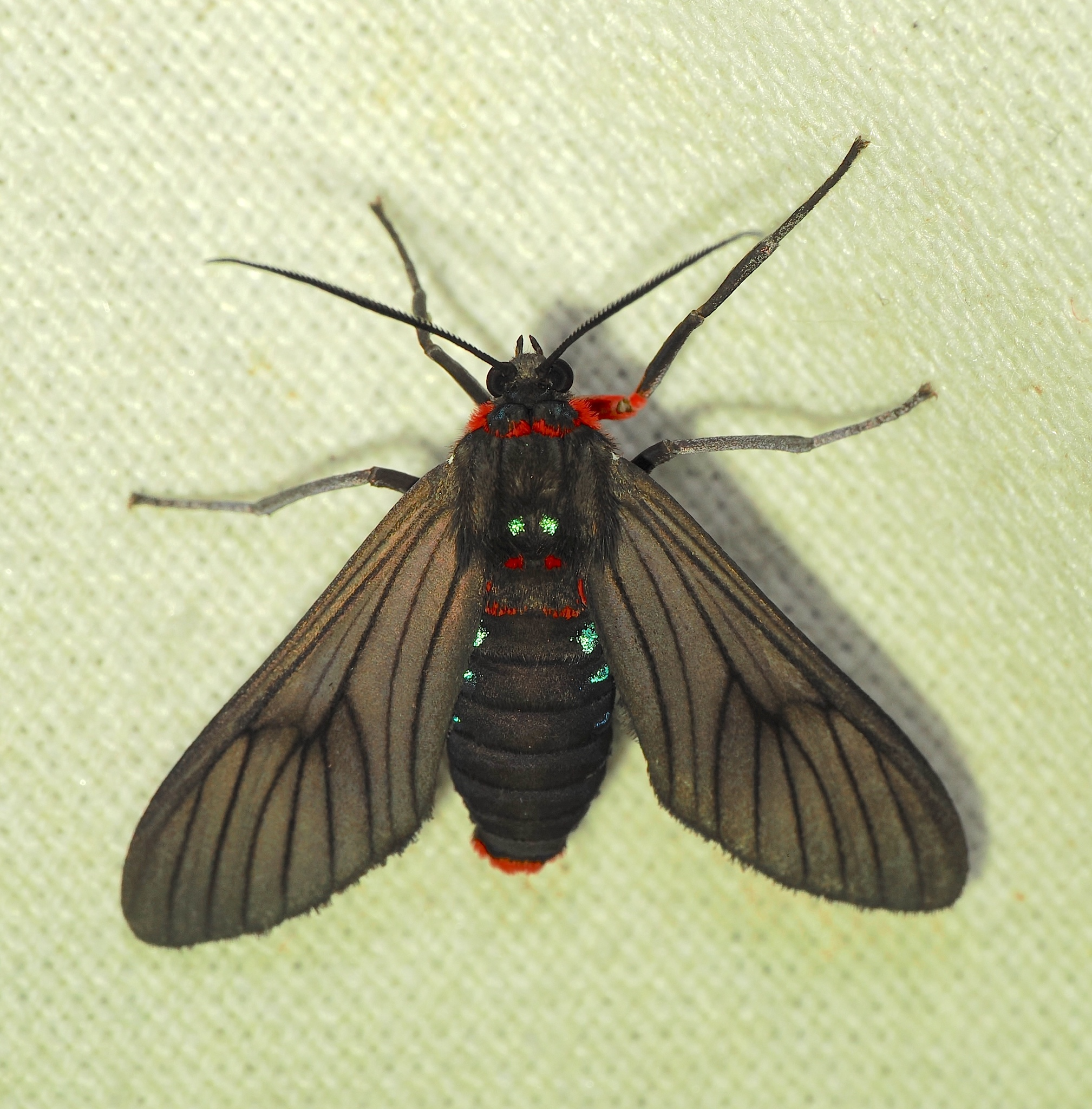

Scientific classification
- Kingdom: Animalia
- Phylum: Arthropoda
- Clade: Pancrustacea
- Class: Insecta
- Order: Lepidoptera
- Superfamily: Noctuoidea
- Family: Erebidae
- Subfamily: Arctiinae
- Genus: Saurita
- Species: S. cassandra

Binomial name
- Saurita cassandra (Linnaeus, 1758)

Synonyms
- Sphinx cassandra Linnaeus, 1758

= Saurita cassandra =

Species of moth

Saurita cassandra is a moth in the subfamily Arctiinae. It was described by Carl Linnaeus in his 1758 10th edition of Systema Naturae. It is found in Trinidad, Suriname, Venezuela and Argentina.
