= Saurita incerta =

Scientific classification
- Kingdom: Animalia
- Phylum: Arthropoda
- Class: Insecta
- Order: Lepidoptera
- Superfamily: Noctuoidea
- Family: Erebidae
- Subfamily: Arctiinae
- Genus: Saurita
- Species: S. incerta

Binomial name
- Saurita incerta (Walker, 1856)

Synonyms
- Tipulodes incerta Walker, 1856; Gymnopoda corallonota Felder, 1874; Thrinacia intermedia Druce, 1884

Species of moth

Saurita incerta is a moth in the subfamily Arctiinae. It was described by Francis Walker in 1856. It is found in Panama and Colombia.
