= Histioea amazonica =

Scientific classification
- Domain: Eukaryota
- Kingdom: Animalia
- Phylum: Arthropoda
- Class: Insecta
- Order: Lepidoptera
- Superfamily: Noctuoidea
- Family: Erebidae
- Subfamily: Arctiinae
- Genus: Histioea
- Species: H. amazonica

Binomial name
- Histioea amazonica Butler, 1876

Synonyms
- Histioea inferioris Butler, 1876; Histioea amazonica excentrica Bryk, 1953

Species of moth

Histioea amazonica is a moth of the subfamily Arctiinae. It was described by Arthur Gardiner Butler in 1876. It is found in the Amazon region.
