= Saurita salta =

Scientific classification
- Domain: Eukaryota
- Kingdom: Animalia
- Phylum: Arthropoda
- Class: Insecta
- Order: Lepidoptera
- Superfamily: Noctuoidea
- Family: Erebidae
- Subfamily: Arctiinae
- Genus: Saurita
- Species: S. salta

Binomial name
- Saurita salta (Schaus, 1894)

Synonyms
- Thrinacia salta Schaus, 1894

Species of moth

Saurita salta is a moth in the subfamily Arctiinae. It was described by Schaus in 1894. It is primarily found in Venezuela.
