= Saurita rubripuncta =

Scientific classification
- Domain: Eukaryota
- Kingdom: Animalia
- Phylum: Arthropoda
- Class: Insecta
- Order: Lepidoptera
- Superfamily: Noctuoidea
- Family: Erebidae
- Subfamily: Arctiinae
- Genus: Saurita
- Species: S. rubripuncta

Binomial name
- Saurita rubripuncta Schaus, 1911

Species of moth

Saurita rubripuncta is a moth in the subfamily Arctiinae. It was described by William Schaus in 1911. It is found in Costa Rica.
