= Saurita temenus =

Scientific classification
- Domain: Eukaryota
- Kingdom: Animalia
- Phylum: Arthropoda
- Class: Insecta
- Order: Lepidoptera
- Superfamily: Noctuoidea
- Family: Erebidae
- Subfamily: Arctiinae
- Genus: Saurita
- Species: S. temenus

Binomial name
- Saurita temenus (Stoll, 1782)

Synonyms
- Sphinx temenus Stoll, [1781]; Glaucopis afflicta Walker, 1854; Thrinacia afflicta

Species of moth

Saurita temenus is a moth in the subfamily Arctiinae. It was described by Stoll in 1782. It is found in Suriname and the Amazon region.
