= Saurita myrrha =

Scientific classification
- Domain: Eukaryota
- Kingdom: Animalia
- Phylum: Arthropoda
- Class: Insecta
- Order: Lepidoptera
- Superfamily: Noctuoidea
- Family: Erebidae
- Subfamily: Arctiinae
- Genus: Saurita
- Species: S. myrrha

Binomial name
- Saurita myrrha (H. Druce, 1884)

Synonyms
- Cosmosoma myrrha H. Druce, 1884

Species of moth

Saurita myrrha is a moth in the subfamily Arctiinae. It was described by Herbert Druce in 1884. It is found in Guatemala.
