= Euagra intercisa =

Scientific classification
- Kingdom: Animalia
- Phylum: Arthropoda
- Class: Insecta
- Order: Lepidoptera
- Superfamily: Noctuoidea
- Family: Erebidae
- Subfamily: Arctiinae
- Genus: Euagra
- Species: E. intercisa

Binomial name
- Euagra intercisa Butler, 1876

Synonyms
- Dioptis auxo Walker, 1854

Species of moth

Euagra intercisa is a moth of the subfamily Arctiinae. It was described by Arthur Gardiner Butler in 1876. It is found in Venezuela.
