= Saurita cretheis =

Scientific classification
- Domain: Eukaryota
- Kingdom: Animalia
- Phylum: Arthropoda
- Class: Insecta
- Order: Lepidoptera
- Superfamily: Noctuoidea
- Family: Erebidae
- Subfamily: Arctiinae
- Genus: Saurita
- Species: S. cretheis

Binomial name
- Saurita cretheis (H. Druce, 1883)

Synonyms
- Dycladia cretheis H. Druce, 1883

Species of moth

Saurita cretheis is a moth in the subfamily Arctiinae. It was described by Herbert Druce in 1883. It is found in Ecuador.

Adults are black brown. The forewings have two slight hyaline (glass-like) streaks in the end of the cell and a narrow wedge-shaped streak below the cell and a series of patches between the bases of veins 2 to 7. The hindwings have a hyaline streak in and beyond the lower end of the cell and a short streak beyond the upper angle.
