= Saurita gracula =

Scientific classification
- Domain: Eukaryota
- Kingdom: Animalia
- Phylum: Arthropoda
- Class: Insecta
- Order: Lepidoptera
- Superfamily: Noctuoidea
- Family: Erebidae
- Subfamily: Arctiinae
- Genus: Saurita
- Species: S. gracula

Binomial name
- Saurita gracula Dognin, 1911

Species of moth

Saurita gracula is a moth in the subfamily Arctiinae. It was described by Paul Dognin in 1911. It is found in Colombia.
