= Histioea tina =

Scientific classification
- Kingdom: Animalia
- Phylum: Arthropoda
- Clade: Pancrustacea
- Class: Insecta
- Order: Lepidoptera
- Superfamily: Noctuoidea
- Family: Erebidae
- Subfamily: Arctiinae
- Genus: Histioea
- Species: H. tina

Binomial name
- Histioea tina (Walker, 1854)

Synonyms
- Euchromia tina Walker, 1854; Sphenoptera batesi Felder, 1874

Species of moth

Histioea tina is a moth of the subfamily Arctiinae. It was described by Francis Walker in 1854. It is found in southern Brazil.
