= Saurita cryptoleuca =

Scientific classification
- Kingdom: Animalia
- Phylum: Arthropoda
- Class: Insecta
- Order: Lepidoptera
- Superfamily: Noctuoidea
- Family: Erebidae
- Subfamily: Arctiinae
- Genus: Saurita
- Species: S. cryptoleuca

Binomial name
- Saurita cryptoleuca (Walker, 1854)

Synonyms
- Euchromia cryptoleuca Walker, 1854

Species of moth

Saurita cryptoleuca is a moth in the subfamily Arctiinae. It was described by Francis Walker in 1854. It is found in the Amazon region.
