= Poecilosoma nigerrima =

Scientific classification
- Kingdom: Animalia
- Phylum: Arthropoda
- Clade: Pancrustacea
- Class: Insecta
- Order: Lepidoptera
- Superfamily: Noctuoidea
- Family: Erebidae
- Subfamily: Arctiinae
- Genus: Poecilosoma
- Species: P. nigerrima

Binomial name
- Poecilosoma nigerrima (Walker, 1864)

Synonyms
- Gymnelia nigerrima Walker, [1865]

Species of moth

Poecilosoma nigerrima is a moth in the subfamily Arctiinae. It was described by Francis Walker in 1864. It is found in the Amazon region.
