= Narosodes punctana =

Scientific classification
- Kingdom: Animalia
- Phylum: Arthropoda
- Class: Insecta
- Order: Lepidoptera
- Superfamily: Noctuoidea
- Family: Erebidae
- Subfamily: Arctiinae
- Genus: Narosodes
- Species: N. punctana

Binomial name
- Narosodes punctana (Walker, 1863)

Synonyms
- Tospitis punctana Walker, 1863

Species of moth

Narosodes punctana is a moth of the family Erebidae. It was described by Francis Walker in 1863. It is found in Sri Lanka and India and on Borneo.

== Description ==
Its wingspan is 16 mm. In the male, the head and thorax are ochreous. Forewings are reddish brown except for the margins. The margins are ochreous. A raised dark scale tuft can be found at end of cell. Few scales are scattered near vein 1. Some small black specks can be found at apex. Abdomen and hindwings are pale ochreous.

== Ecology ==
The habitat consists of lowland dipterocarp forests, secondary and coastal forests, as well as dry heath forests.
