= Saurita pilipennis =

Scientific classification
- Domain: Eukaryota
- Kingdom: Animalia
- Phylum: Arthropoda
- Class: Insecta
- Order: Lepidoptera
- Superfamily: Noctuoidea
- Family: Erebidae
- Subfamily: Arctiinae
- Genus: Saurita
- Species: S. pilipennis

Binomial name
- Saurita pilipennis Zerny, 1931

Species of moth

Saurita pilipennis is a moth in the subfamily Arctiinae. It was described by Zerny in 1931. It is found in Colombia.
