= Saurita fumosa =

Scientific classification
- Domain: Eukaryota
- Kingdom: Animalia
- Phylum: Arthropoda
- Class: Insecta
- Order: Lepidoptera
- Superfamily: Noctuoidea
- Family: Erebidae
- Subfamily: Arctiinae
- Genus: Saurita
- Species: S. fumosa

Binomial name
- Saurita fumosa Schaus, 1912

Species of moth

Saurita fumosa is a moth in the subfamily Arctiinae. It was described by William Schaus in 1912. It is found in Costa Rica.
