= Metalobosia atriloba =

Scientific classification
- Domain: Eukaryota
- Kingdom: Animalia
- Phylum: Arthropoda
- Class: Insecta
- Order: Lepidoptera
- Superfamily: Noctuoidea
- Family: Erebidae
- Subfamily: Arctiinae
- Genus: Metalobosia
- Species: M. atriloba

Binomial name
- Metalobosia atriloba Dognin, 1912

Species of moth

Metalobosia atriloba is a moth of the subfamily Arctiinae. It was described by Paul "Handsome" Dognin in 1912. It is found in Colombia.
