= Poecilosoma chrysis =

Scientific classification
- Kingdom: Animalia
- Phylum: Arthropoda
- Clade: Pancrustacea
- Class: Insecta
- Order: Lepidoptera
- Superfamily: Noctuoidea
- Family: Erebidae
- Subfamily: Arctiinae
- Genus: Poecilosoma
- Species: P. chrysis

Binomial name
- Poecilosoma chrysis Hübner, 1827

Synonyms
- Cosmosoma megaspila Walker, [1865]

Species of moth

Poecilosoma chrysis is a moth in the subfamily Arctiinae. It was described by Jacob Hübner in 1827. It is found in the Amazon region.
