= Euagra fenestra =

Scientific classification
- Kingdom: Animalia
- Phylum: Arthropoda
- Class: Insecta
- Order: Lepidoptera
- Superfamily: Noctuoidea
- Family: Erebidae
- Subfamily: Arctiinae
- Genus: Euagra
- Species: E. fenestra

Binomial name
- Euagra fenestra (Walker, 1854)

Synonyms
- Dioptis fenestra Walker, 1854

Species of moth

Euagra fenestra is a moth of the subfamily Arctiinae. It was described by Francis Walker in 1854. It is found in Brazil.
