= Euagra monoscopa =

Scientific classification
- Domain: Eukaryota
- Kingdom: Animalia
- Phylum: Arthropoda
- Class: Insecta
- Order: Lepidoptera
- Superfamily: Noctuoidea
- Family: Erebidae
- Subfamily: Arctiinae
- Genus: Euagra
- Species: E. monoscopa

Binomial name
- Euagra monoscopa Kaye, 1919

Species of moth

Euagra monoscopa is a moth of the subfamily Arctiinae. It was described by William James Kaye in 1919. It is found in Ecuador.
