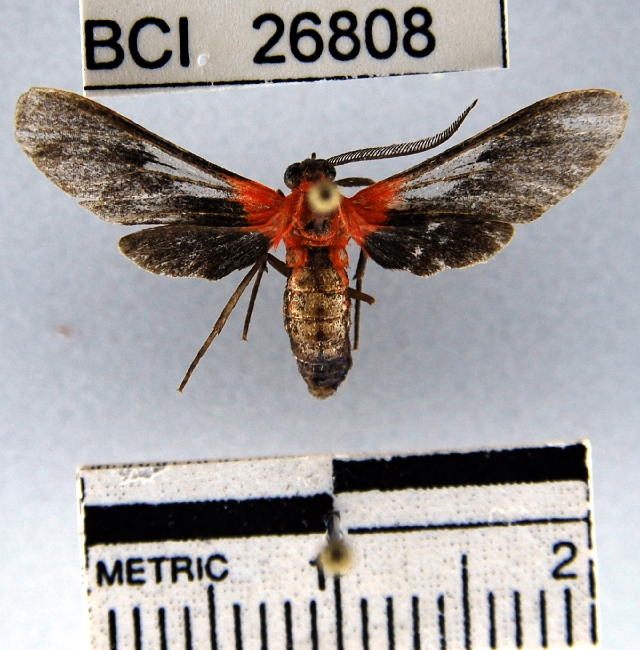

Scientific classification
- Domain: Eukaryota
- Kingdom: Animalia
- Phylum: Arthropoda
- Class: Insecta
- Order: Lepidoptera
- Superfamily: Noctuoidea
- Family: Erebidae
- Subfamily: Arctiinae
- Genus: Saurita
- Species: S. anselma

Binomial name
- Saurita anselma Schaus, 1924

= Saurita anselma =

Species of moth

Saurita anselma is a moth in the subfamily Arctiinae. It was described by William Schaus in 1924. It is found in Panama.
