= Saurita hemiphaea =

Scientific classification
- Domain: Eukaryota
- Kingdom: Animalia
- Phylum: Arthropoda
- Class: Insecta
- Order: Lepidoptera
- Superfamily: Noctuoidea
- Family: Erebidae
- Subfamily: Arctiinae
- Genus: Saurita
- Species: S. hemiphaea

Binomial name
- Saurita hemiphaea Dognin, 1909

Synonyms
- Saurita pipis Oberthur

Species of moth

Saurita hemiphaea is a moth in the subfamily Arctiinae. It was described by Paul Dognin in 1909. It is found in French Guiana.
