= Apeplopoda =

Scientific classification
- Domain: Eukaryota
- Kingdom: Animalia
- Phylum: Arthropoda
- Class: Insecta
- Order: Lepidoptera
- Superfamily: Noctuoidea
- Family: Erebidae
- Subfamily: Arctiinae
- Subtribe: Ctenuchina
- Genus: Apeplopoda; Watson, 1980

Synonyms
- Gymnopoda Felder, 1874

Genus of moths

Apeplopoda is a genus of tiger moths in the family Erebidae. The genus was erected by Watson in 1980.

== Species ==
- Apeplopoda improvisa (Schaus, 1912)
- Apeplopoda mecrida (H. Druce, 1889)
- Apeplopoda ochracea (Felder, 1874)
