= Saurita erythroguia =

Scientific classification
- Kingdom: Animalia
- Phylum: Arthropoda
- Clade: Pancrustacea
- Class: Insecta
- Order: Lepidoptera
- Superfamily: Noctuoidea
- Family: Erebidae
- Subfamily: Arctiinae
- Genus: Saurita
- Species: S. erythroguia

Binomial name
- Saurita erythroguia Hampson, 1898

Species of moth

Saurita erythroguia is a moth in the subfamily Arctiinae. It was described by George Hampson in 1898. It is found in Brazil.
