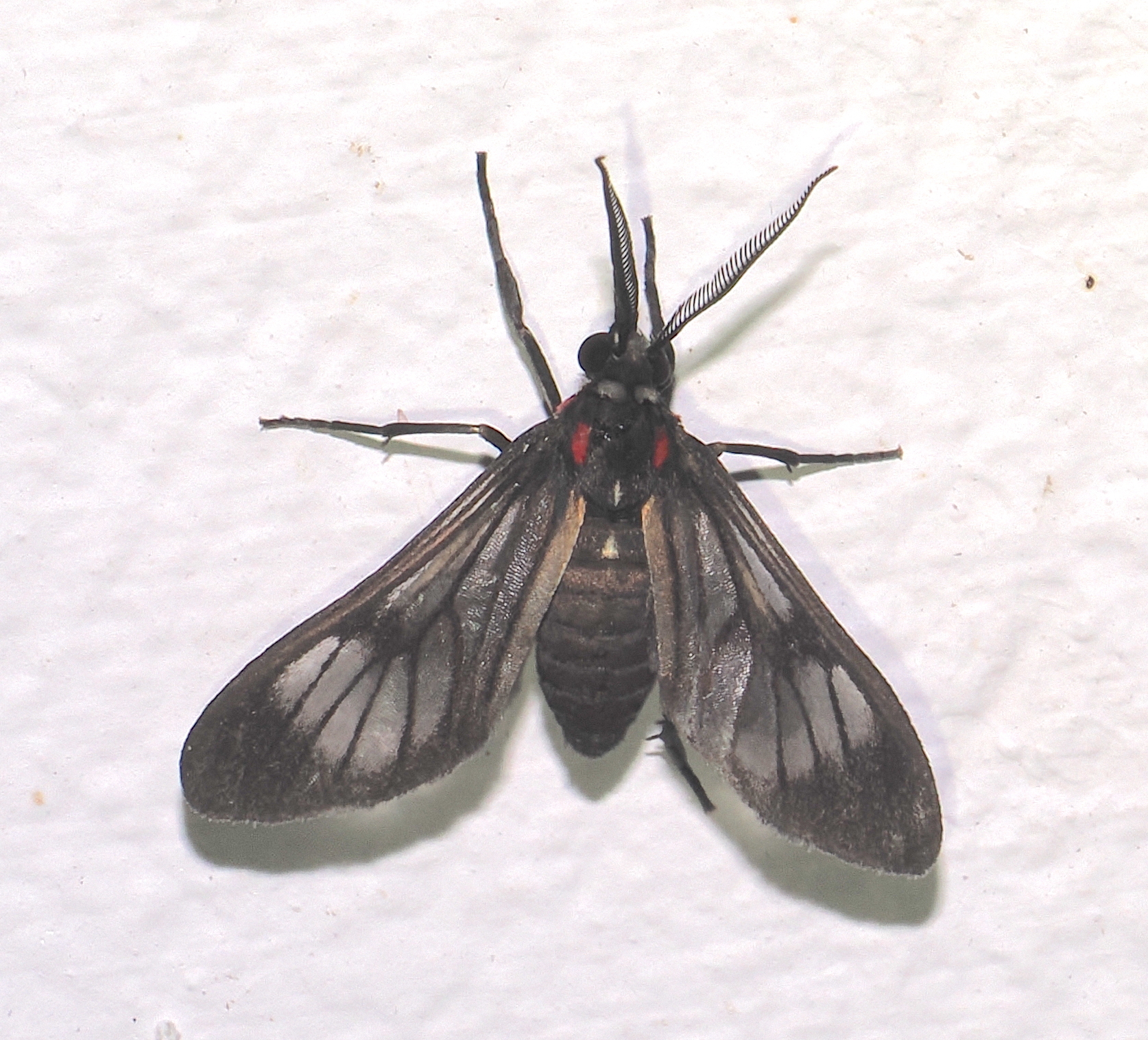

Scientific classification
- Kingdom: Animalia
- Phylum: Arthropoda
- Class: Insecta
- Order: Lepidoptera
- Superfamily: Noctuoidea
- Family: Erebidae
- Subfamily: Arctiinae
- Genus: Saurita
- Species: S. arimensis

Binomial name
- Saurita arimensis Fleming, 1957

= Saurita arimensis =

Species of moth

Saurita arimensis is a moth in the subfamily Arctiinae. It was described by Henry Fleming in 1957. It is found in Trinidad.
