= Euagra caerulea =

Scientific classification
- Kingdom: Animalia
- Phylum: Arthropoda
- Clade: Pancrustacea
- Class: Insecta
- Order: Lepidoptera
- Superfamily: Noctuoidea
- Family: Erebidae
- Subfamily: Arctiinae
- Genus: Euagra
- Species: E. caerulea

Binomial name
- Euagra caerulea Dognin, 1891

Species of moth

Euagra caerulea is a moth of the subfamily Arctiinae. It was described by Paul Dognin in 1891. It is found in Ecuador.
