= Ichoria pyrrhonota =

Scientific classification
- Domain: Eukaryota
- Kingdom: Animalia
- Phylum: Arthropoda
- Class: Insecta
- Order: Lepidoptera
- Superfamily: Noctuoidea
- Family: Erebidae
- Subfamily: Arctiinae
- Genus: Ichoria
- Species: I. pyrrhonota

Binomial name
- Ichoria pyrrhonota Zerny, 1931

Species of moth

Ichoria pyrrhonota is a moth of the subfamily Arctiinae. It was described by Zerny in 1931. It is found in Brazil.
