= Narosodes =

Scientific classification
- Domain: Eukaryota
- Kingdom: Animalia
- Phylum: Arthropoda
- Class: Insecta
- Order: Lepidoptera
- Superfamily: Noctuoidea
- Family: Erebidae
- Subfamily: Arctiinae
- Tribe: Lithosiini
- Genus: Narosodes; Moore, [1887]

Genus of moths

Narosodes is a genus of moths in the family Erebidae erected by Frederic Moore in 1887.

== Description ==
Palpi slender, porrect (extending forward) and reaching beyond the frontal tuft. Antennae minutely ciliated (hairy) in the male. Forewing with a slight raised tuft of scales in the cell. Vein 3 to 5 from angle of cell and vein 6 absent. Veins 7 and 8 stalked and veins 9 and 10 free. Hindwings with vein 4 from angle of cell and vein 5 from above the angle. Vein 3 absent, veins 6 and 7 stalked and vein 8 from middle of cell.

== Species ==
- Narosodes fasciata Rothschild, 1913
- Narosodes hampsoni Draudt, 1914
- Narosodes metatroga Hampson, 1918
- Narosodes punctana Walker, 1863
- Narosodes rufocostalis Rothschild, 1912
