= Histioea boliviana =

Scientific classification
- Domain: Eukaryota
- Kingdom: Animalia
- Phylum: Arthropoda
- Class: Insecta
- Order: Lepidoptera
- Superfamily: Noctuoidea
- Family: Erebidae
- Subfamily: Arctiinae
- Genus: Histioea
- Species: H. boliviana

Binomial name
- Histioea boliviana H. Druce, 1890

Species of moth

Histioea boliviana is a moth of the subfamily Arctiinae. It was described by Herbert Druce in 1890. It is found in Bolivia.
