= Ptychotricos =

Scientific classification
- Domain: Eukaryota
- Kingdom: Animalia
- Phylum: Arthropoda
- Class: Insecta
- Order: Lepidoptera
- Superfamily: Noctuoidea
- Family: Erebidae
- Subfamily: Arctiinae
- Genus: Ptychotricos; Schaus, 1894

Synonyms
- Ptychotrichus Zerny, 1912

Genus of moths

Ptychotricos is a genus of moths in the subfamily Arctiinae.

== Species ==
- Ptychotricos elongata Schaus, 1905
- Ptychotricos episcepsidis Draudt, 1931
- Ptychotricos fenestrifer Zerny, 1931
- Ptychotricos zeus Schaus, 1894
