= Poecilosoma eone =

Scientific classification
- Kingdom: Animalia
- Phylum: Arthropoda
- Clade: Pancrustacea
- Class: Insecta
- Order: Lepidoptera
- Superfamily: Noctuoidea
- Family: Erebidae
- Subfamily: Arctiinae
- Genus: Poecilosoma
- Species: P. eone

Binomial name
- Poecilosoma eone (Hübner, 1827)

Synonyms
- Agerocha eone Hübner, 1824

Species of moth

Poecilosoma eone is a moth in the subfamily Arctiinae. It was described by Jacob Hübner in 1827. It is found in the Amazon region.
