= Ichoria virescens =

Scientific classification
- Domain: Eukaryota
- Kingdom: Animalia
- Phylum: Arthropoda
- Class: Insecta
- Order: Lepidoptera
- Superfamily: Noctuoidea
- Family: Erebidae
- Subfamily: Arctiinae
- Genus: Ichoria
- Species: I. virescens

Binomial name
- Ichoria virescens Dognin, 1914

Species of moth

Ichoria virescens is a moth of the subfamily Arctiinae. It was described by Paul Dognin in 1914. It is found in Colombia.
