= Saurita tenuis =

Scientific classification
- Kingdom: Animalia
- Phylum: Arthropoda
- Class: Insecta
- Order: Lepidoptera
- Superfamily: Noctuoidea
- Family: Erebidae
- Subfamily: Arctiinae
- Genus: Saurita
- Species: S. tenuis

Binomial name
- Saurita tenuis (Butler, 1876)

Synonyms
- Pseudomya tenuis Butler, 1877; Echoneura tenuis

Species of moth

Saurita tenuis is a moth in the subfamily Arctiinae. It was described by Arthur Gardiner Butler in 1876. It is found in the Amazon region.
