= Histioea proserpina =

Scientific classification
- Kingdom: Animalia
- Phylum: Arthropoda
- Clade: Pancrustacea
- Class: Insecta
- Order: Lepidoptera
- Superfamily: Noctuoidea
- Family: Erebidae
- Subfamily: Arctiinae
- Genus: Histioea
- Species: H. proserpina

Binomial name
- Histioea proserpina (Hübner, 1827)

Synonyms
- Euchromia proserpina Hübner, 1823

Species of moth

Histioea proserpina is a moth of the subfamily Arctiinae. It was described by Jacob Hübner in 1827. It is found in the Amazon region.
