= Saurita tijuca =

Scientific classification
- Domain: Eukaryota
- Kingdom: Animalia
- Phylum: Arthropoda
- Class: Insecta
- Order: Lepidoptera
- Superfamily: Noctuoidea
- Family: Erebidae
- Subfamily: Arctiinae
- Genus: Saurita
- Species: S. tijuca

Binomial name
- Saurita tijuca (Schaus, 1892)

Synonyms
- Pseudomya tijuca Schaus, 1892

Species of moth

Saurita tijuca is a moth in the subfamily Arctiinae. It was described by Schaus in 1892. It is found in Brazil (Rio de Janeiro).
