= Eriphioides surinamensis =

Scientific classification
- Kingdom: Animalia
- Phylum: Arthropoda
- Class: Insecta
- Order: Lepidoptera
- Superfamily: Noctuoidea
- Family: Erebidae
- Subfamily: Arctiinae
- Genus: Eriphioides
- Species: E. surinamensis

Binomial name
- Eriphioides surinamensis (Möschler, 1877)

Synonyms
- Eriphia surinamensis Möschler, 1878

Species of moth

Eriphioides surinamensis is a moth of the subfamily Arctiinae. It was described by Heinrich Benno Möschler in 1877. It is found in Panama, Colombia and Ecuador.
