= Poecilosoma =

Scientific classification
- Domain: Eukaryota
- Kingdom: Animalia
- Phylum: Arthropoda
- Class: Insecta
- Order: Lepidoptera
- Superfamily: Noctuoidea
- Family: Erebidae
- Subfamily: Arctiinae
- Genus: Poecilosoma; Hübner, [1819]

Synonyms
- Agerocha Hübner, 1831

Genus of moths

Poecilosoma is a genus of moths in the subfamily Arctiinae The genus was erected by Jacob Hübner in 1819.

== Species ==
- Poecilosoma annulatum Draudt, 1915
- Poecilosoma chrysis Hübner, 1823
- Poecilosoma eone (Hübner, 1824)
- Poecilosoma eusebia (Druce, 1883)
- Poecilosoma mapirense Strand, 1915
- Poecilosoma marginata (Walker, 1856)
- Poecilosoma misionum Strand, 1915
- Poecilosoma nigerrima (Walker, 1865)
- Poecilosoma vespoides Schaus, 1905
