= Saurita clandestina =

Scientific classification
- Domain: Eukaryota
- Kingdom: Animalia
- Phylum: Arthropoda
- Class: Insecta
- Order: Lepidoptera
- Superfamily: Noctuoidea
- Family: Erebidae
- Subfamily: Arctiinae
- Genus: Saurita
- Species: S. clandestina

Binomial name
- Saurita clandestina Zerny, 1912

Synonyms
- Saurita cryptoleuca Hampson, 1903

Species of moth

Saurita clandestina is a moth in the subfamily Arctiinae. It was described by Zerny in 1912. It is found in Brazil (Rio de Janeiro).
