= Saurita intricata =

Scientific classification
- Kingdom: Animalia
- Phylum: Arthropoda
- Class: Insecta
- Order: Lepidoptera
- Superfamily: Noctuoidea
- Family: Erebidae
- Subfamily: Arctiinae
- Genus: Saurita
- Species: S. intricata

Binomial name
- Saurita intricata (Walker, 1854)

Synonyms
- Euchromia intricata Walker, 1854; Echoneura angusta Butler, 1876; Echoneura catastibina Butler, 1876

Species of moth

Saurita intricata is a moth in the subfamily Arctiinae. It was described by Francis Walker in 1854. It is found in the Brazilian states of Espírito Santo and Rio de Janeiro.
