= Saurita attenuata =

Scientific classification
- Kingdom: Animalia
- Phylum: Arthropoda
- Class: Insecta
- Order: Lepidoptera
- Superfamily: Noctuoidea
- Family: Erebidae
- Subfamily: Arctiinae
- Genus: Saurita
- Species: S. attenuata

Binomial name
- Saurita attenuata Hampson, 1905

Species of moth

Saurita attenuata is a moth in the subfamily Arctiinae. It was described by George Hampson in 1905. It is found in the Amazon region.
