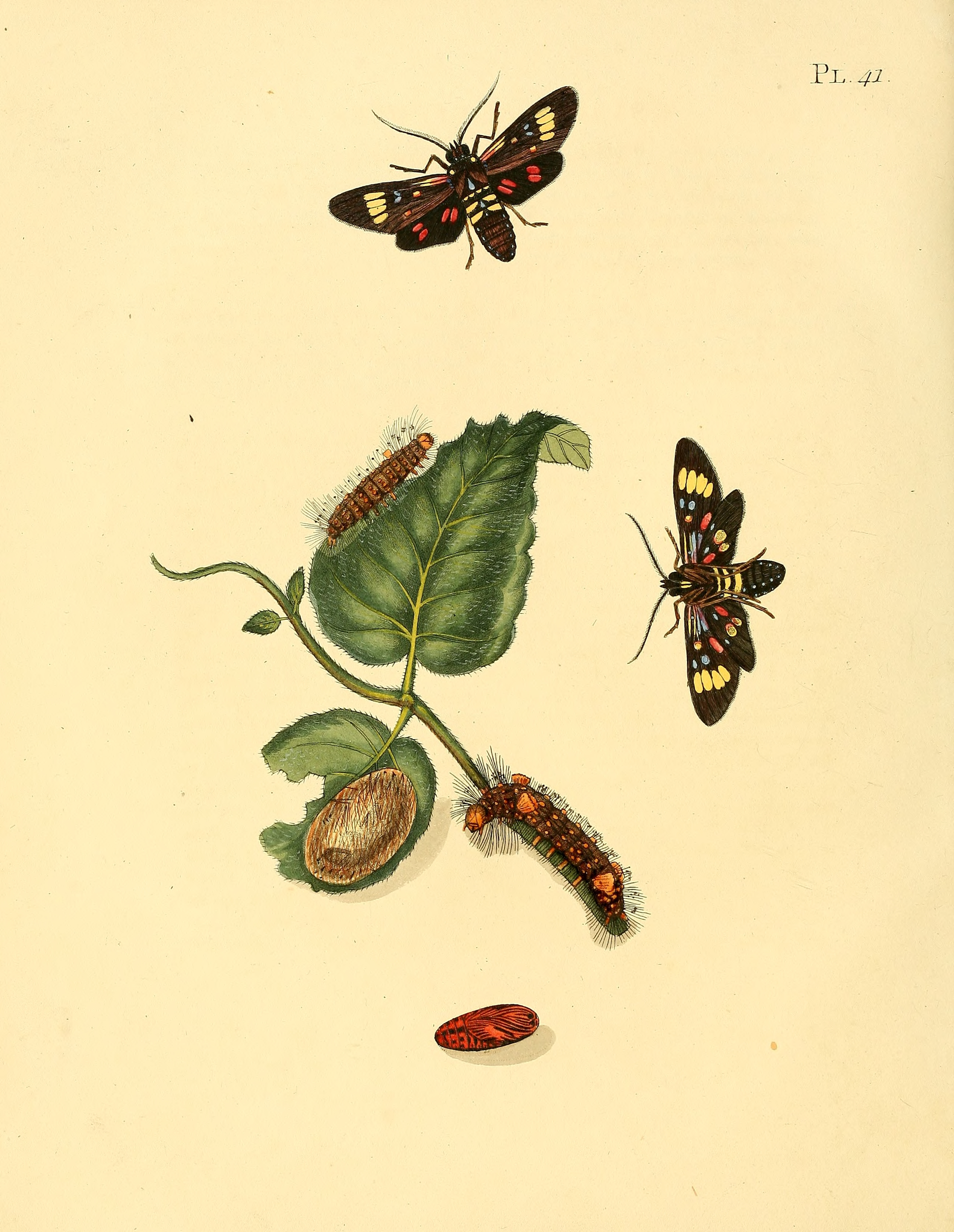
- llustration of: Histioea cepheus (as syn. Glaucopis cepheus)

Scientific classification
- Kingdom: Animalia
- Phylum: Arthropoda
- Clade: Pancrustacea
- Class: Insecta
- Order: Lepidoptera
- Superfamily: Noctuoidea
- Family: Erebidae
- Subfamily: Arctiinae
- Genus: Histioea
- Species: H. cepheus

Binomial name
- Histioea cepheus (Cramer, 1779)

Synonyms
- Sphinx cepheus Cramer, [1779]; Histioea monticola Klages, 1906; Histioea cepheus oculea Draudt, 1915; Histioea taperinhae Draudt, 1931

= Histioea cepheus =

Species of moth

Histioea cepheus is a moth of the subfamily Arctiinae. It was described by Pieter Cramer in 1779. It is found in Trinidad, Suriname and Venezuela.
