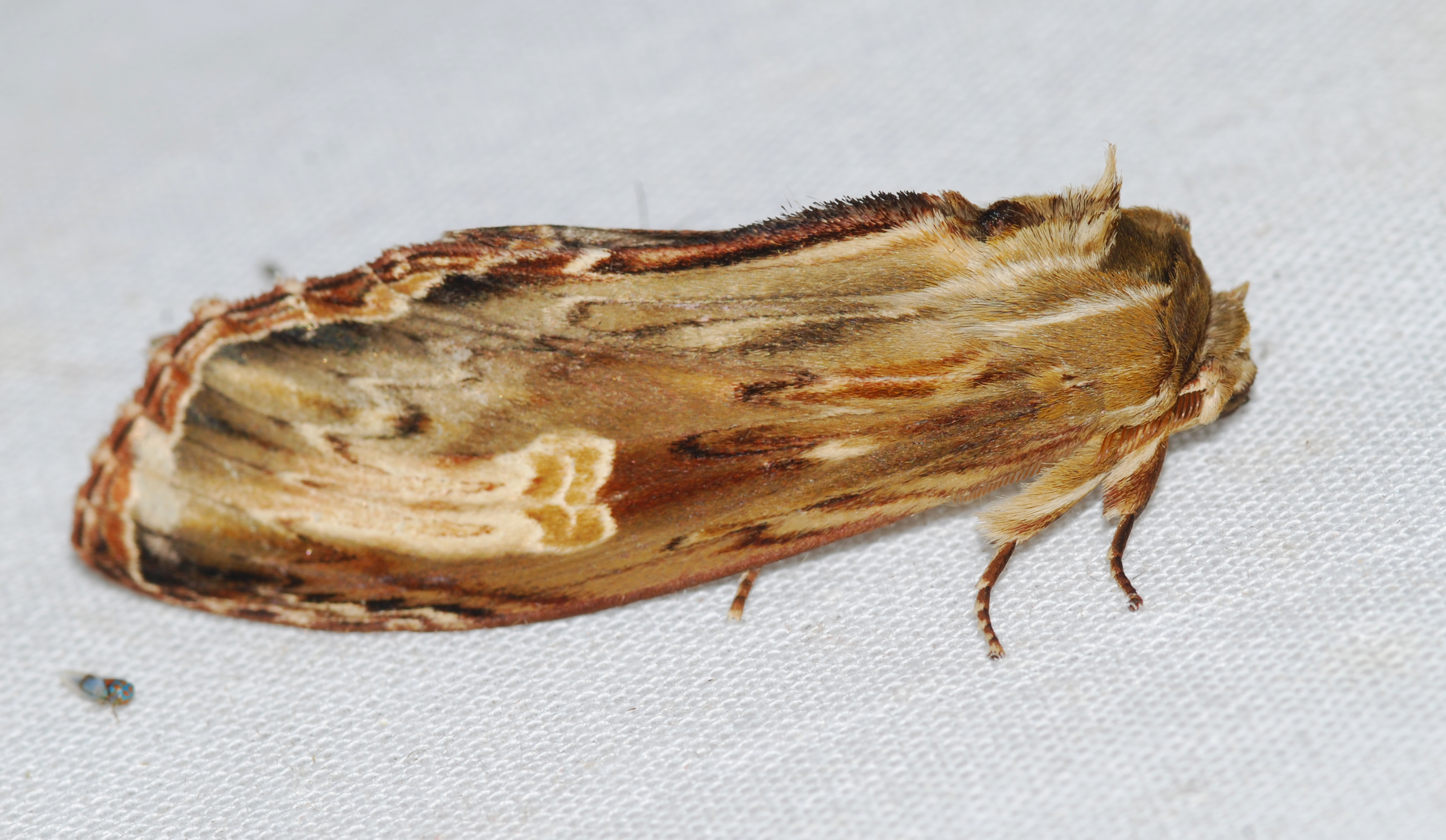
- Lirimiris meridionalis

Scientific classification
- Kingdom: Animalia
- Phylum: Arthropoda
- Class: Insecta
- Order: Lepidoptera
- Superfamily: Noctuoidea
- Family: Notodontidae
- Genus: Lirimiris; Walker, 1865

= Lirimiris =

Genus of moths

Lirimiris is a genus of moths of the family Notodontidae erected by Francis Walker in 1865.

== Species ==
- Lirimiris albolineata Druce, 1887
- Lirimiris auriflua Draudt, 1937
- Lirimiris guatemalensis Rothschild, 1917
- Lirimiris lignitecta Walker, 1865
- Lirimiris meridionalis (Schaus, 1904)
- Lirimiris truncata (Herrich-Schäffer, [1856])
