= Saurita concisa =

Scientific classification
- Kingdom: Animalia
- Phylum: Arthropoda
- Class: Insecta
- Order: Lepidoptera
- Superfamily: Noctuoidea
- Family: Erebidae
- Subfamily: Arctiinae
- Genus: Saurita
- Species: S. concisa

Binomial name
- Saurita concisa (Walker, 1854)

Synonyms
- Euchromia concisa Walker, 1854; Saurita thoracica Klages, 1906; Saurita concise Hernández-Baz, 2013

Species of moth

Saurita concisa is a moth in the subfamily Arctiinae. It was described by Francis Walker in 1854. It is found in Panama and the Amazon region.
