= Poecilosoma mapirense =

Scientific classification
- Kingdom: Animalia
- Phylum: Arthropoda
- Clade: Pancrustacea
- Class: Insecta
- Order: Lepidoptera
- Superfamily: Noctuoidea
- Family: Erebidae
- Subfamily: Arctiinae
- Genus: Poecilosoma
- Species: P. mapirense

Binomial name
- Poecilosoma mapirense Strand, 1915

Species of moth

Poecilosoma mapirense is a moth in the subfamily Arctiinae. It was described by Strand in 1915.
