= Apeplopoda mecrida =

Scientific classification
- Kingdom: Animalia
- Phylum: Arthropoda
- Class: Insecta
- Order: Lepidoptera
- Superfamily: Noctuoidea
- Family: Erebidae
- Subfamily: Arctiinae
- Genus: Apeplopoda
- Species: A. mecrida

Binomial name
- Apeplopoda mecrida (H. Druce, 1889)

Synonyms
- Gymnopoda mecrida H. Druce, 1889; Mystrocneme dulcicordis Dyar, 1907

Species of moth

Apeplopoda mecrida is a moth of the family Erebidae. It was described by Herbert Druce in 1889. It found in the US state of Arizona, Mexico, Guatemala and Costa Rica.
