= Apeplopoda ochracea =

Scientific classification
- Domain: Eukaryota
- Kingdom: Animalia
- Phylum: Arthropoda
- Class: Insecta
- Order: Lepidoptera
- Superfamily: Noctuoidea
- Family: Erebidae
- Subfamily: Arctiinae
- Genus: Apeplopoda
- Species: A. ochracea

Binomial name
- Apeplopoda ochracea (Felder, 1874)

Synonyms
- Gymnopoda ochracea Felder, 1874; Pseudomya musca Schaus, 1892; Thrinacia pontia Druce, 1894

Species of moth

Apeplopoda ochracea is a moth of the family Erebidae. It was described by Felder in 1874. It found in Colombia and Mexico.
