= Max Wilhelm Karl Draudt =

German entomologist

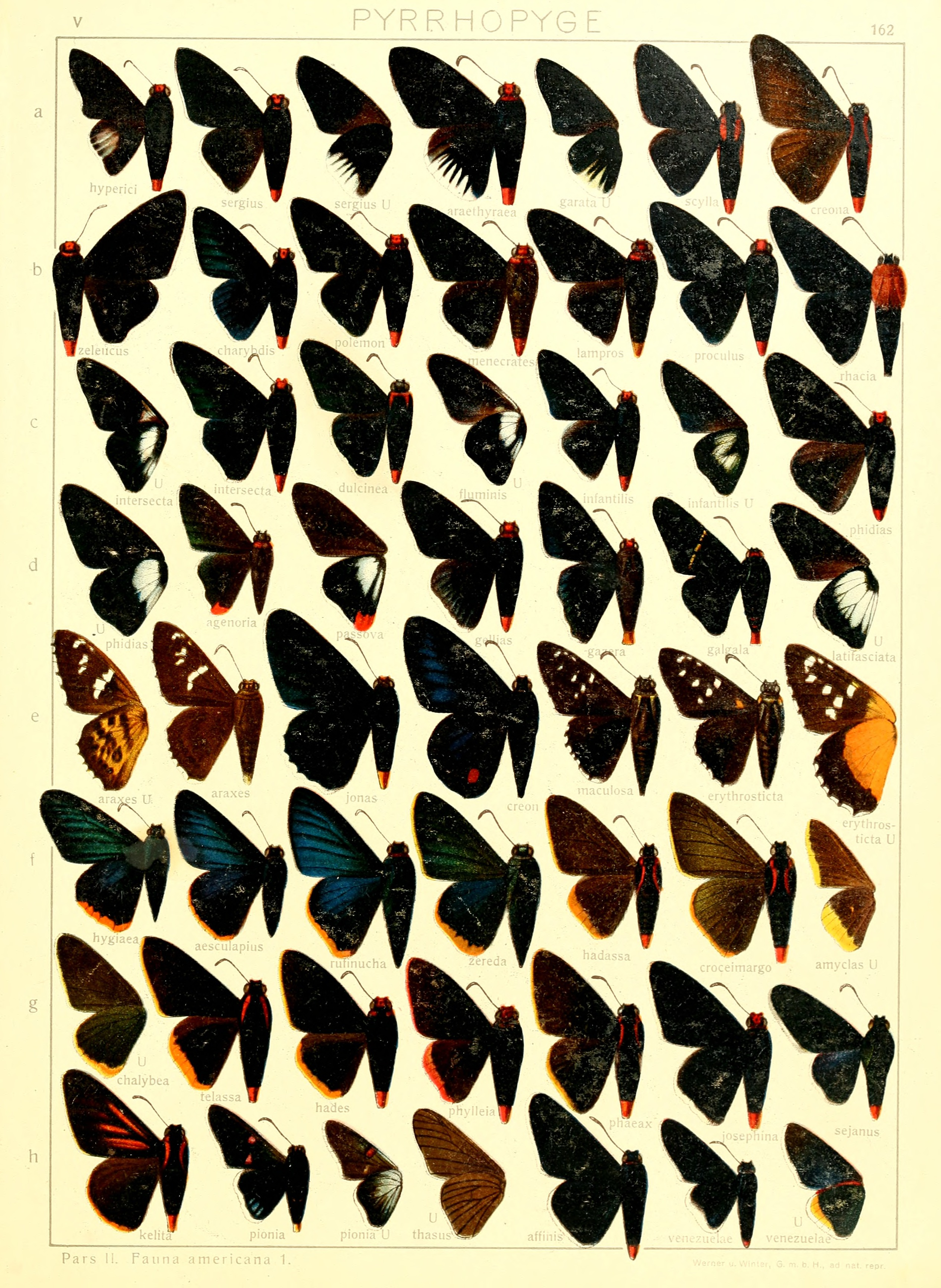
"Die Großschmetterlinge der Erde", in Adalbert Seitz (1910–1924), Macrolepidoptera of the World, vol. 5. American Butterflies

Max Wilhelm Karl Draudt (11 March 1875, Darmstadt – 4 April 1953 Darmstadt) was a German entomologist, who specialised in Lepidoptera.

His collections of the Lepidoptera of Mexico are conserved in various institutions such as Senckenberg Museum, the Muséum national d'histoire naturelle and the Museum für Naturkunde.

Partial list of publications

- 1919. Family: Lycaenidae, pp. 744–831, pls. 144–159. In Adalbert Seitz (1910–1924), Macrolepidoptera of the World, vol. 5. American Butterflies. Alfred Kernen Verlag, Stuttgart, 1139 pp., 194 pls.
- 1924 Family: Hesperiidae in Seitz. Macrolepidoptera of the world. Vol. .5. The American Rhopalocera. Stuttgart. vii, + 1139 pp., 203 pl.
