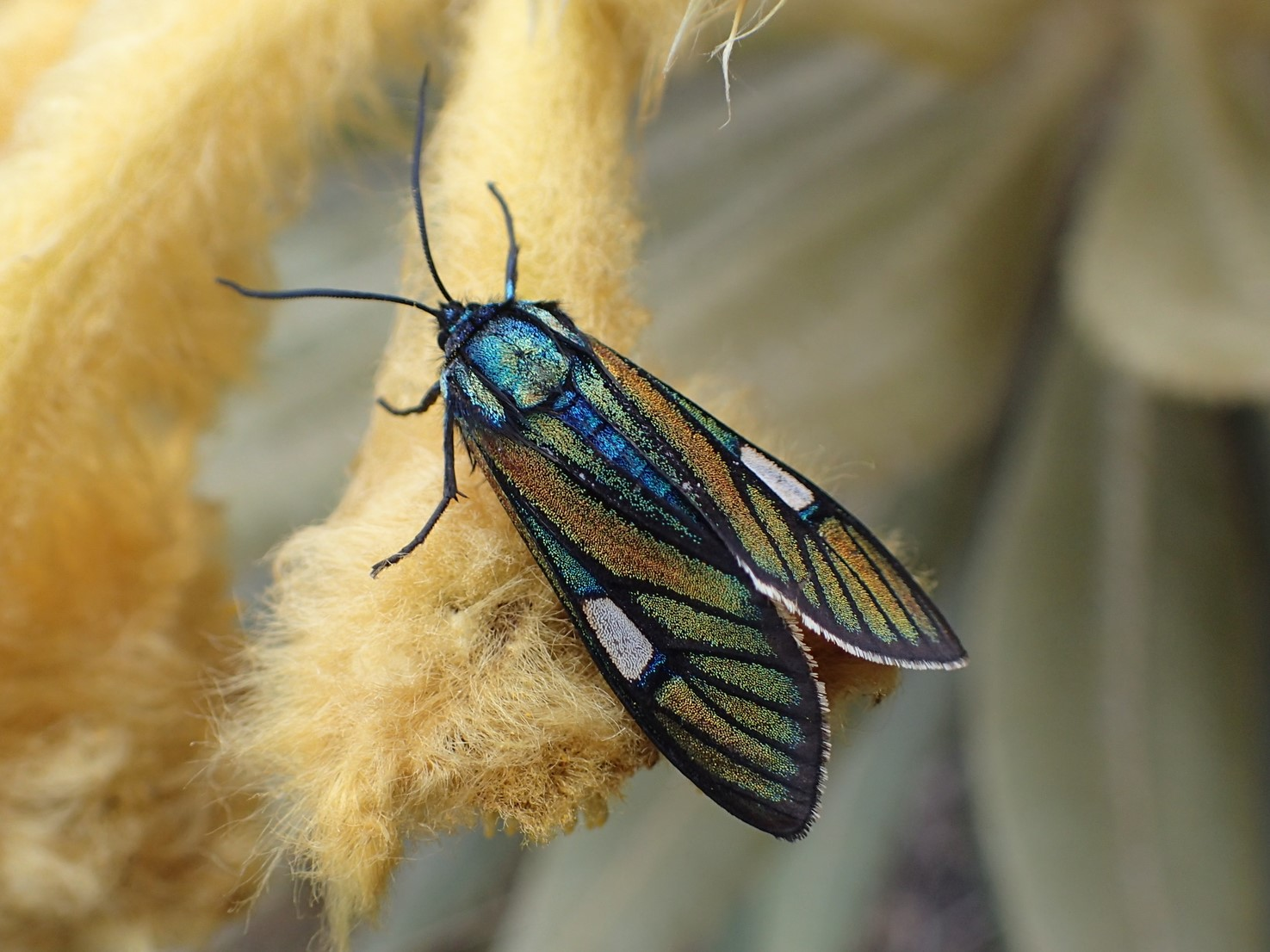
- Eupyra ducalis

Scientific classification
- Kingdom: Animalia
- Phylum: Arthropoda
- Class: Insecta
- Order: Lepidoptera
- Superfamily: Noctuoidea
- Family: Erebidae
- Subfamily: Arctiinae
- Genus: Eupyra; Herrich-Schäffer, [1853]

= Eupyra =

Genus of moths

Eupyra is a genus of moths in the subfamily Arctiinae. The genus was erected by Gottlieb August Wilhelm Herrich-Schäffer in 1853.

== Species ==
- Eupyra affinis Rothschild, 1912
- Eupyra consors Schaus, 1892
- Eupyra disticta Hampson, 1898
- Eupyra distincta Rothschild, 1912
- Eupyra ducalis Maassen, 1890
- Eupyra imperialis Herrich-Schäffer, 1853
- Eupyra psittacus Schaus, 1892
- Eupyra sages Druce, 1895
- Eupyra sarama Dognin, 1891
