= Eupyra consors =

Scientific classification
- Kingdom: Animalia
- Phylum: Arthropoda
- Class: Insecta
- Order: Lepidoptera
- Superfamily: Noctuoidea
- Family: Erebidae
- Subfamily: Arctiinae
- Genus: Eupyra
- Species: E. consors

Binomial name
- Eupyra consors Schaus, 1892

Synonyms
- Eupyra demaculata Strand, 1917

Species of moth

Eupyra consors is a species of moth in the subfamily Arctiinae. It was first described by William Schaus in 1892. It is found in Bolivia and Peru.
