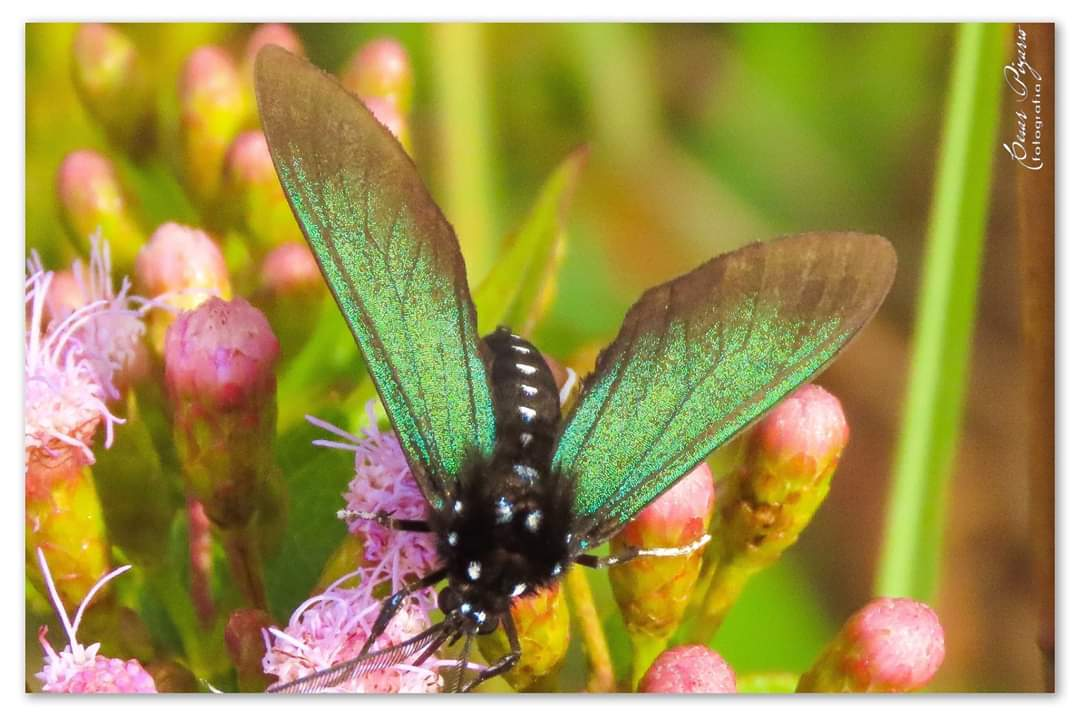

Scientific classification
- Kingdom: Animalia
- Phylum: Arthropoda
- Class: Insecta
- Order: Lepidoptera
- Superfamily: Noctuoidea
- Family: Erebidae
- Subfamily: Arctiinae
- Genus: Eupyra
- Species: E. psittacus

Binomial name
- Eupyra psittacus Schaus, 1892

Synonyms
- Eupyra pinocha Dognin, 1897

= Eupyra psittacus =

Species of moth

Eupyra psittacus is a species of moth in the subfamily Arctiinae. It was first described by William Schaus in 1892. It is found in Bolivia and Peru.
