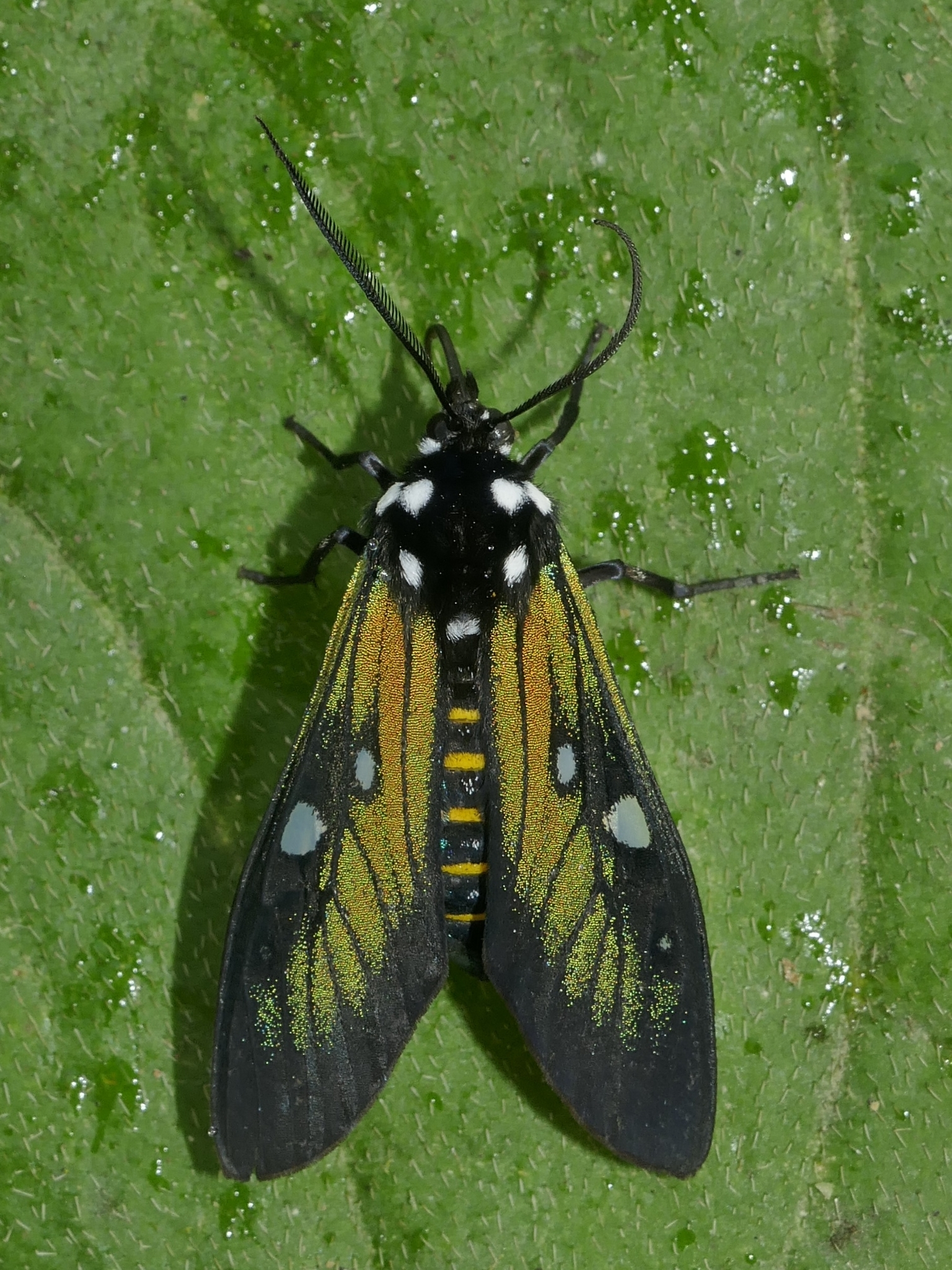

Scientific classification
- Kingdom: Animalia
- Phylum: Arthropoda
- Class: Insecta
- Order: Lepidoptera
- Superfamily: Noctuoidea
- Family: Erebidae
- Subfamily: Arctiinae
- Genus: Eupyra
- Species: E. sarama

Binomial name
- Eupyra sarama Dognin, 1891

Synonyms
- Eupyra sageoides Strand, 1917

= Eupyra sarama =

Species of moth

Eupyra sarama is a species of moth in the subfamily Arctiinae. It was first described by Paul Dognin in 1891. It is found in Venezuela.
