= Eupyra imperialis =

Scientific classification
- Domain: Eukaryota
- Kingdom: Animalia
- Phylum: Arthropoda
- Class: Insecta
- Order: Lepidoptera
- Superfamily: Noctuoidea
- Family: Erebidae
- Subfamily: Arctiinae
- Genus: Eupyra
- Species: E. imperialis

Binomial name
- Eupyra imperialis Herrich-Schäffer, 1853

Synonyms
- Chrysocale florella Butler, 1873

Species of moth

Eupyra imperialis is a moth of the subfamily Arctiinae. It was described by Gottlieb August Wilhelm Herrich-Schäffer in 1853. It is found in Venezuela, Peru and Colombia.

== Subspecies ==
- Eupyra imperialis imperialis (Venezuela, Peru)
- Eupyra imperialis ducalis Maassen, 1890 (Colombia)
