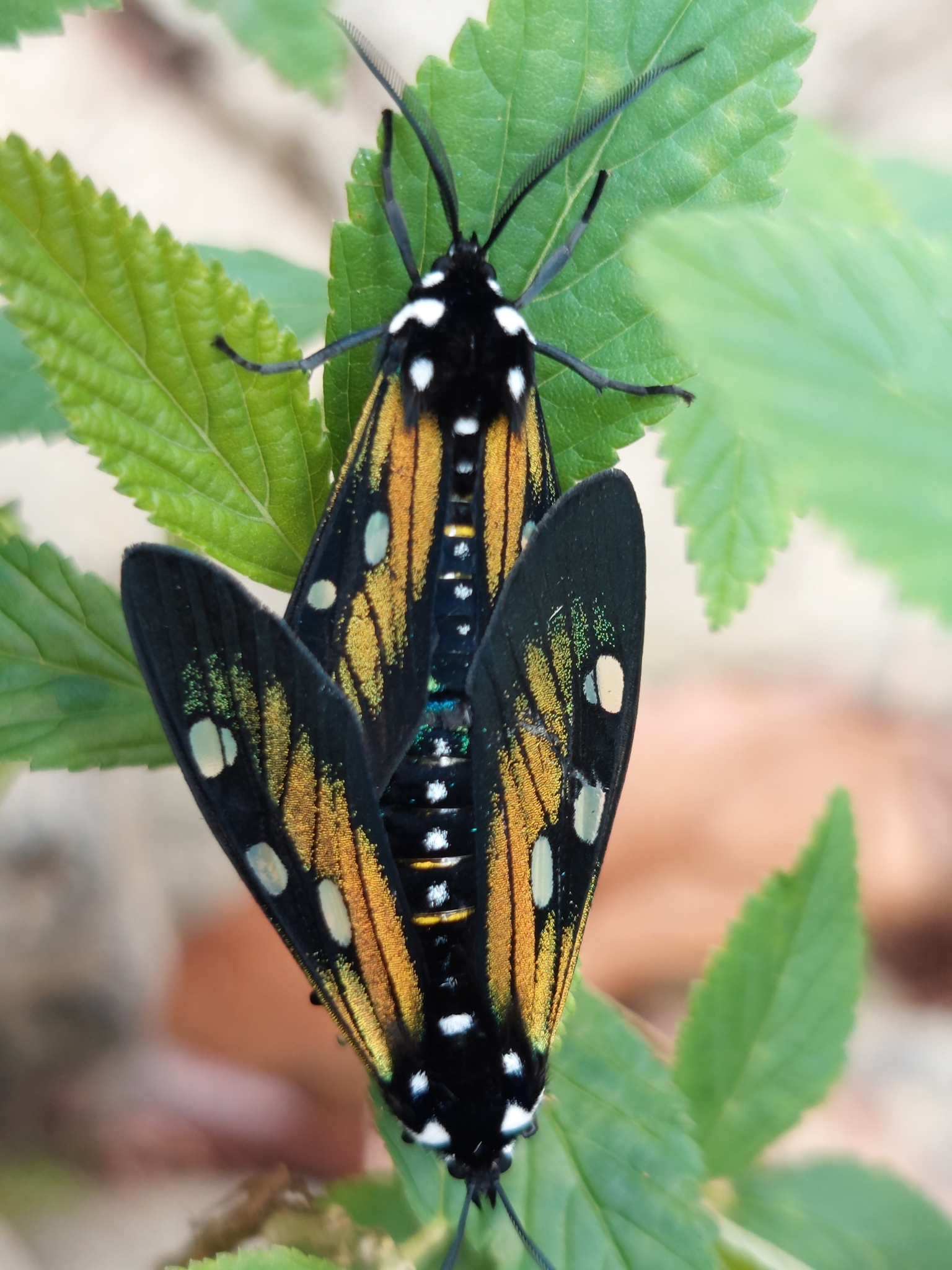

Scientific classification
- Kingdom: Animalia
- Phylum: Arthropoda
- Class: Insecta
- Order: Lepidoptera
- Superfamily: Noctuoidea
- Family: Erebidae
- Subfamily: Arctiinae
- Genus: Eupyra
- Species: E. sages

Binomial name
- Eupyra sages H. Druce, 1895

Synonyms
- Eupyra sages f. reducta Draudt, 1915

= Eupyra sages =

Species of moth

Eupyra sages is a species of moth in the subfamily Arctiinae. It was first described by Herbert Druce in 1895. It is found in Bolivia.
