= Eupyra distincta =

Scientific classification
- Domain: Eukaryota
- Kingdom: Animalia
- Phylum: Arthropoda
- Class: Insecta
- Order: Lepidoptera
- Superfamily: Noctuoidea
- Family: Erebidae
- Subfamily: Arctiinae
- Genus: Eupyra
- Species: E. distincta

Binomial name
- Eupyra distincta Rothschild, 1912

Species of moth

Eupyra distincta is a moth of the subfamily Arctiinae. It was described by Rothschild in 1912. It is found in Venezuela.
