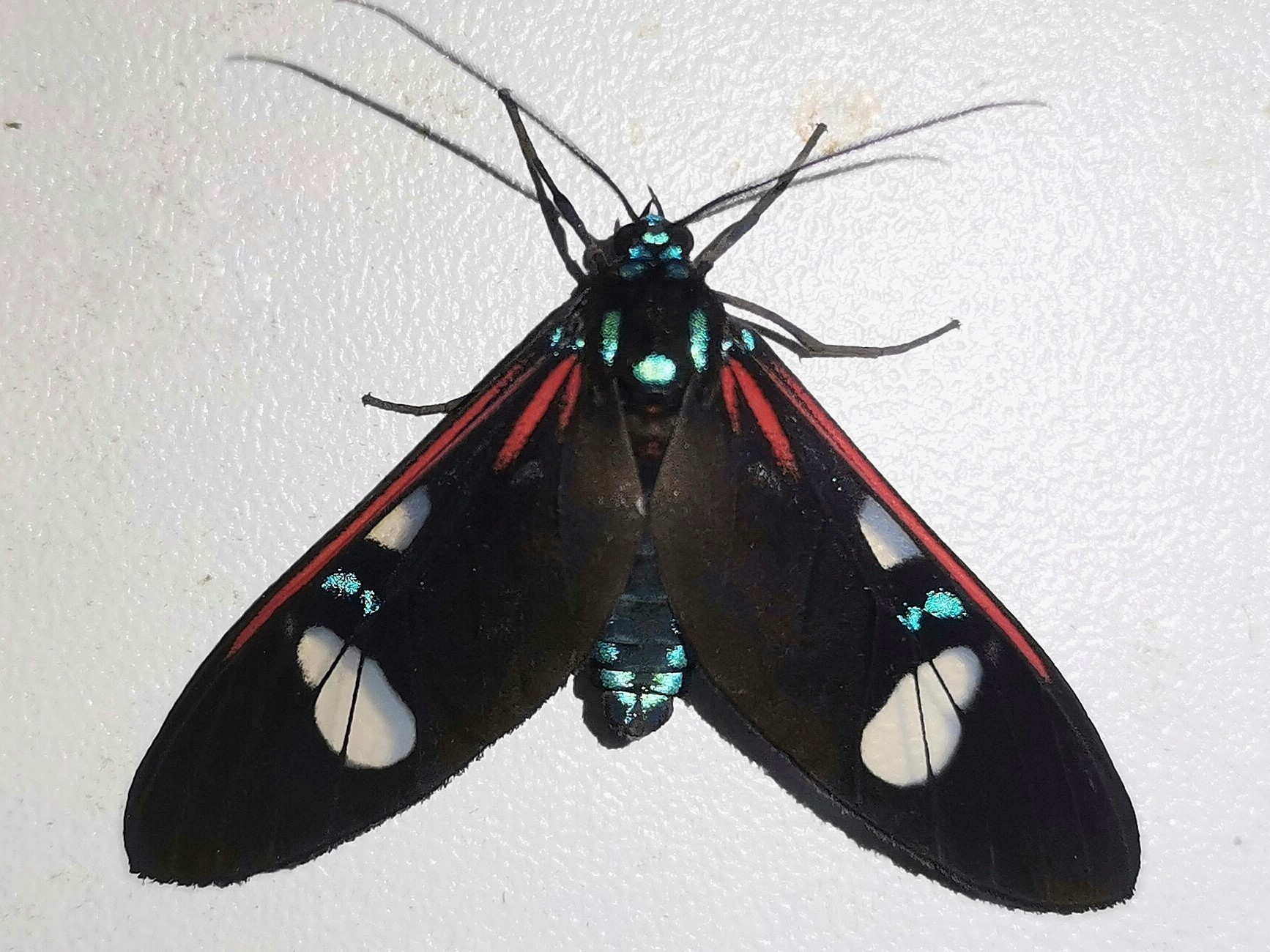
- Euclera meones

Scientific classification
- Domain: Eukaryota
- Kingdom: Animalia
- Phylum: Arthropoda
- Class: Insecta
- Order: Lepidoptera
- Superfamily: Noctuoidea
- Family: Erebidae
- Subfamily: Arctiinae
- Genus: Euclera; Herrich-Schäffer, [1855]

Synonyms
- Androcharta C. & R. Felder, 1862

= Euclera =

Genus of moths

Euclera is a genus of moths in the subfamily Arctiinae. The genus was erected by Gottlieb August Wilhelm Herrich-Schäffer in 1855.

== Species ==
- Euclera cassotis (Druce, 1883)
- Euclera diversipennis (Walker, 1854)
- Euclera meones (Stoll, [1780])
- Euclera rubricincta (Burmeister, 1878)
- Euclera stretchii (Butler, 1876)
