= Euclera stretchii =

Scientific classification
- Kingdom: Animalia
- Phylum: Arthropoda
- Clade: Pancrustacea
- Class: Insecta
- Order: Lepidoptera
- Superfamily: Noctuoidea
- Family: Erebidae
- Subfamily: Arctiinae
- Genus: Euclera
- Species: E. stretchii

Binomial name
- Euclera stretchii (Butler, 1876)

Synonyms
- Androcharta stretchii Butler, 1876

Species of insect

Euclera stretchii is a moth of the subfamily Arctiinae first described by Arthur Gardiner Butler in 1876. It is found in Peru, the Amazon region and Uruguay.
