= Euclera cassotis =

Scientific classification
- Kingdom: Animalia
- Phylum: Arthropoda
- Clade: Pancrustacea
- Class: Insecta
- Order: Lepidoptera
- Superfamily: Noctuoidea
- Family: Erebidae
- Subfamily: Arctiinae
- Genus: Euclera
- Species: E. cassotis

Binomial name
- Euclera cassotis (H. Druce, 1883)

Synonyms
- Androcharta cassotis H. Druce, 1883

Species of insect

Euclera cassotis is a moth of the subfamily Arctiinae first described by Herbert Druce in 1883. It is found in Ecuador and the Amazon region.
