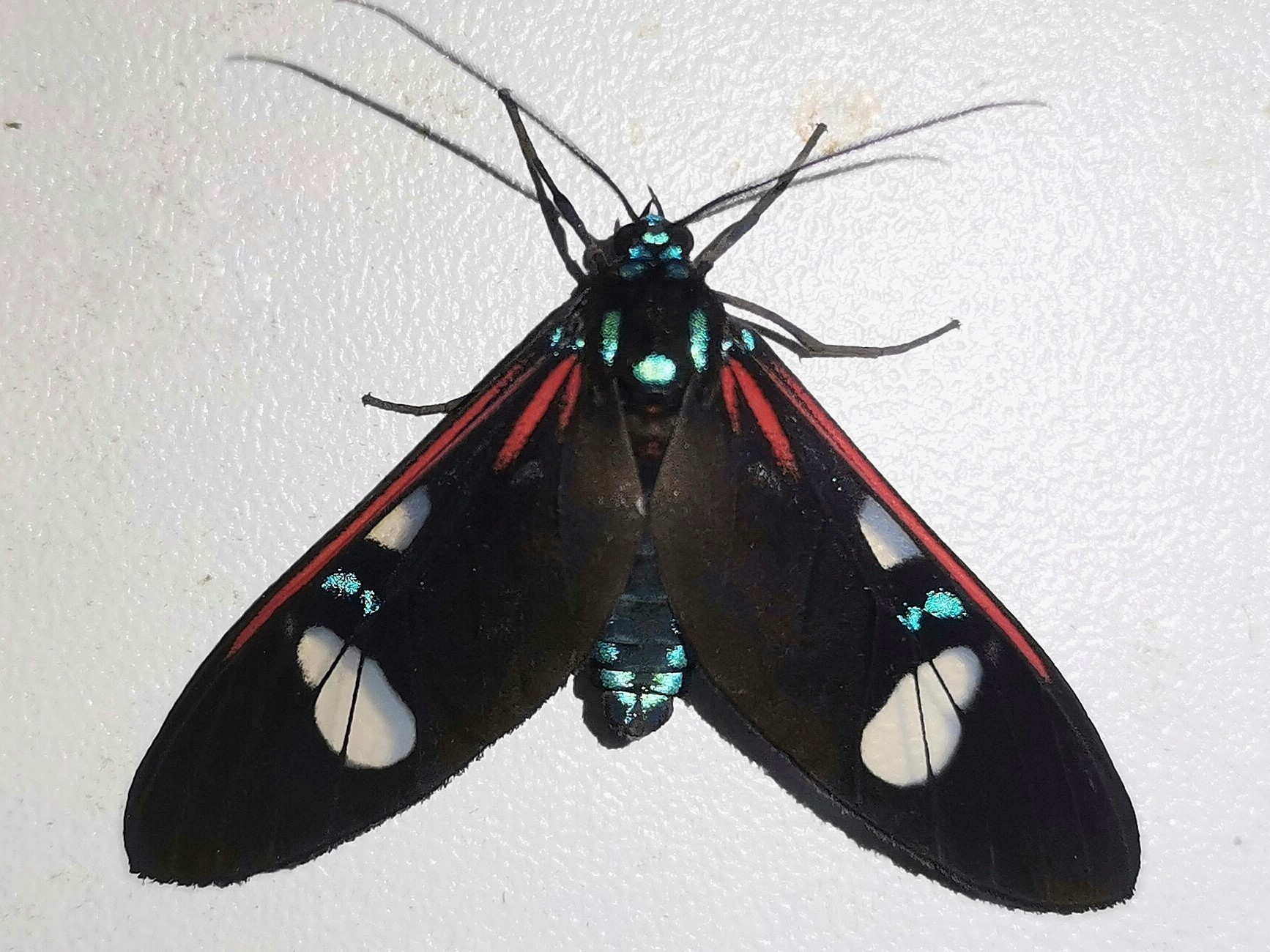

Scientific classification
- Kingdom: Animalia
- Phylum: Arthropoda
- Clade: Pancrustacea
- Class: Insecta
- Order: Lepidoptera
- Superfamily: Noctuoidea
- Family: Erebidae
- Subfamily: Arctiinae
- Genus: Euclera
- Species: E. meones

Binomial name
- Euclera meones (Stoll, [1780])

Synonyms
- Sphinx meones Stoll, [1780]; Glaucopis compta Sepp, [1841]; Charidea meonioides Herrich-Schäffer, [1854]

= Euclera meones =

Species of moth

Euclera meones is a species of moth in the subfamily Arctiinae first described by Stoll in 1780. It is found in Suriname and Colombia.
