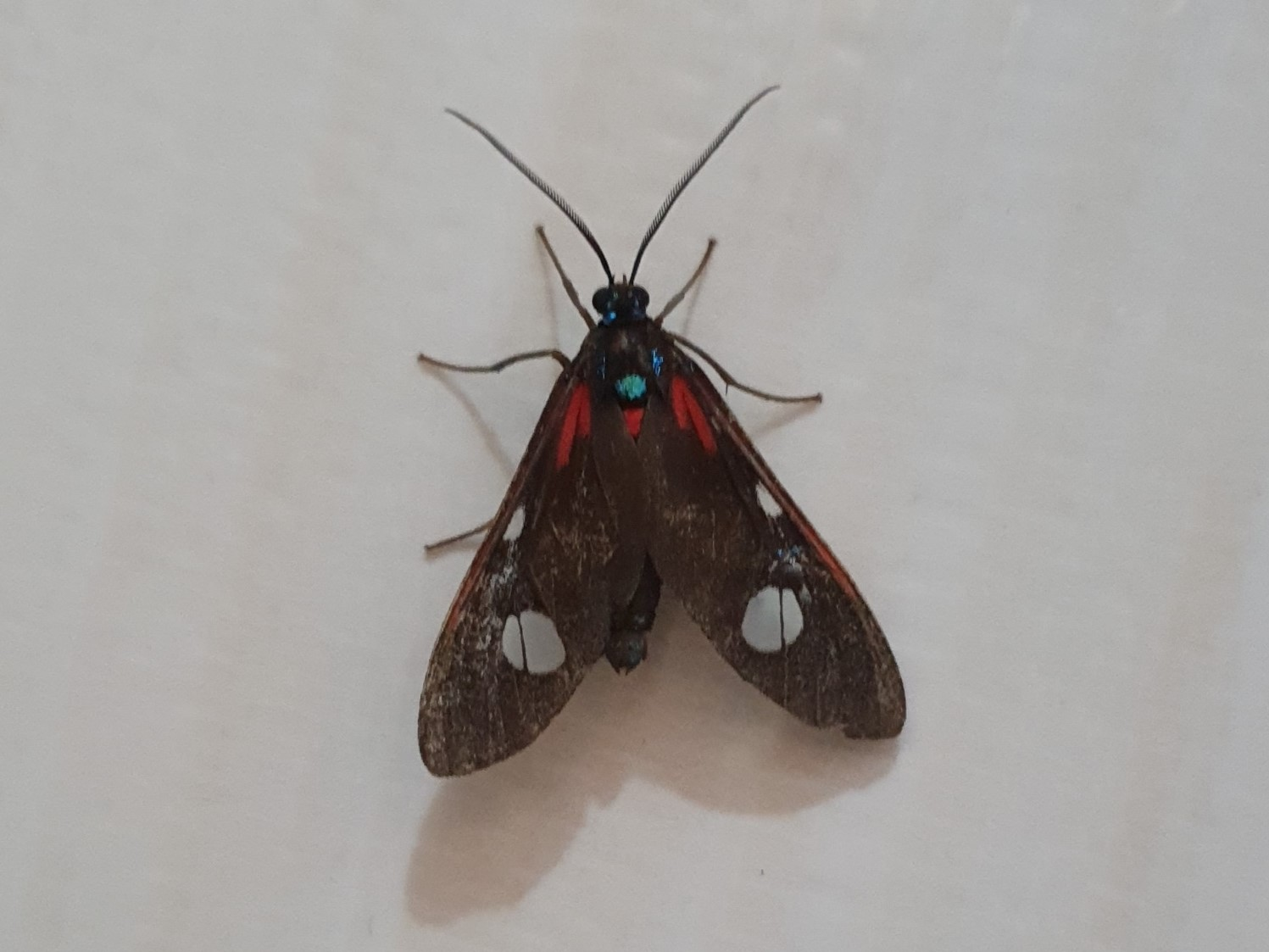

Scientific classification
- Kingdom: Animalia
- Phylum: Arthropoda
- Clade: Pancrustacea
- Class: Insecta
- Order: Lepidoptera
- Superfamily: Noctuoidea
- Family: Erebidae
- Subfamily: Arctiinae
- Genus: Euclera
- Species: E. diversipennis

Binomial name
- Euclera diversipennis (Walker, 1854)

Synonyms
- Euchromia diversipennis Walker, 1854; Androcharta brasiliensis Butler, 1876; Androcharta parvipennis Butler, 1876; Androcharta claripennis Butler, 1878

= Euclera diversipennis =

Species of moth

Euclera diversipennis is a species of moth of the subfamily Arctiinae first described by Francis Walker in 1854. It is found in Brazil (Amazonas, Tefé, São Paulo) and Peru.
