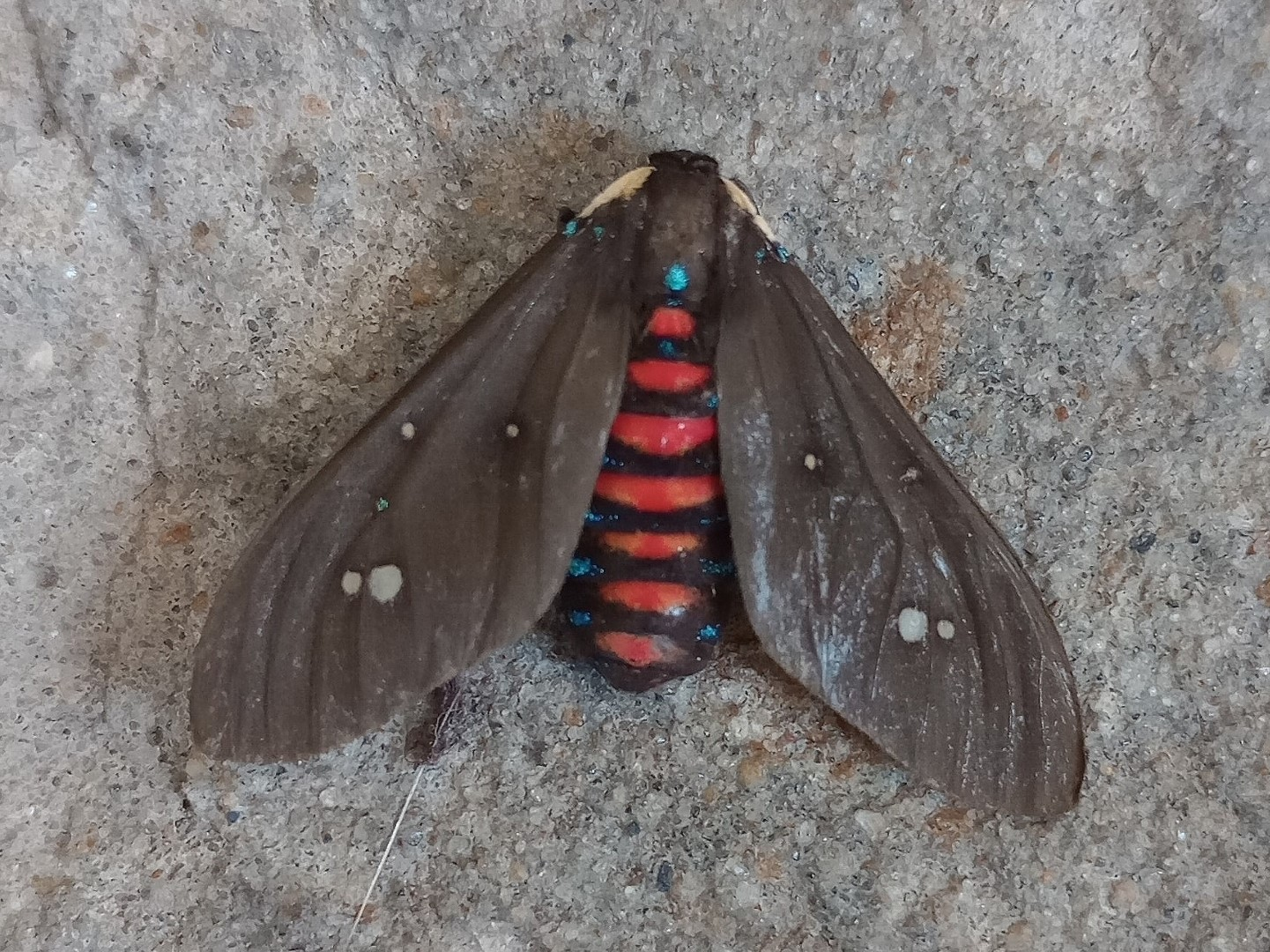

Scientific classification
- Kingdom: Animalia
- Phylum: Arthropoda
- Clade: Pancrustacea
- Class: Insecta
- Order: Lepidoptera
- Superfamily: Noctuoidea
- Family: Erebidae
- Subfamily: Arctiinae
- Genus: Euclera
- Species: E. rubricincta

Binomial name
- Euclera rubricincta (Burmeister, 1878)

Synonyms
- Charidea rubricincta Burmeister, 1878; Androcharta leechi Druce, 1893

= Euclera rubricincta =

Species of moth

Euclera rubricincta is a species of moth in the subfamily Arctiinae first described by Hermann Burmeister in 1878. It is found in the Amazon region and Argentina.
