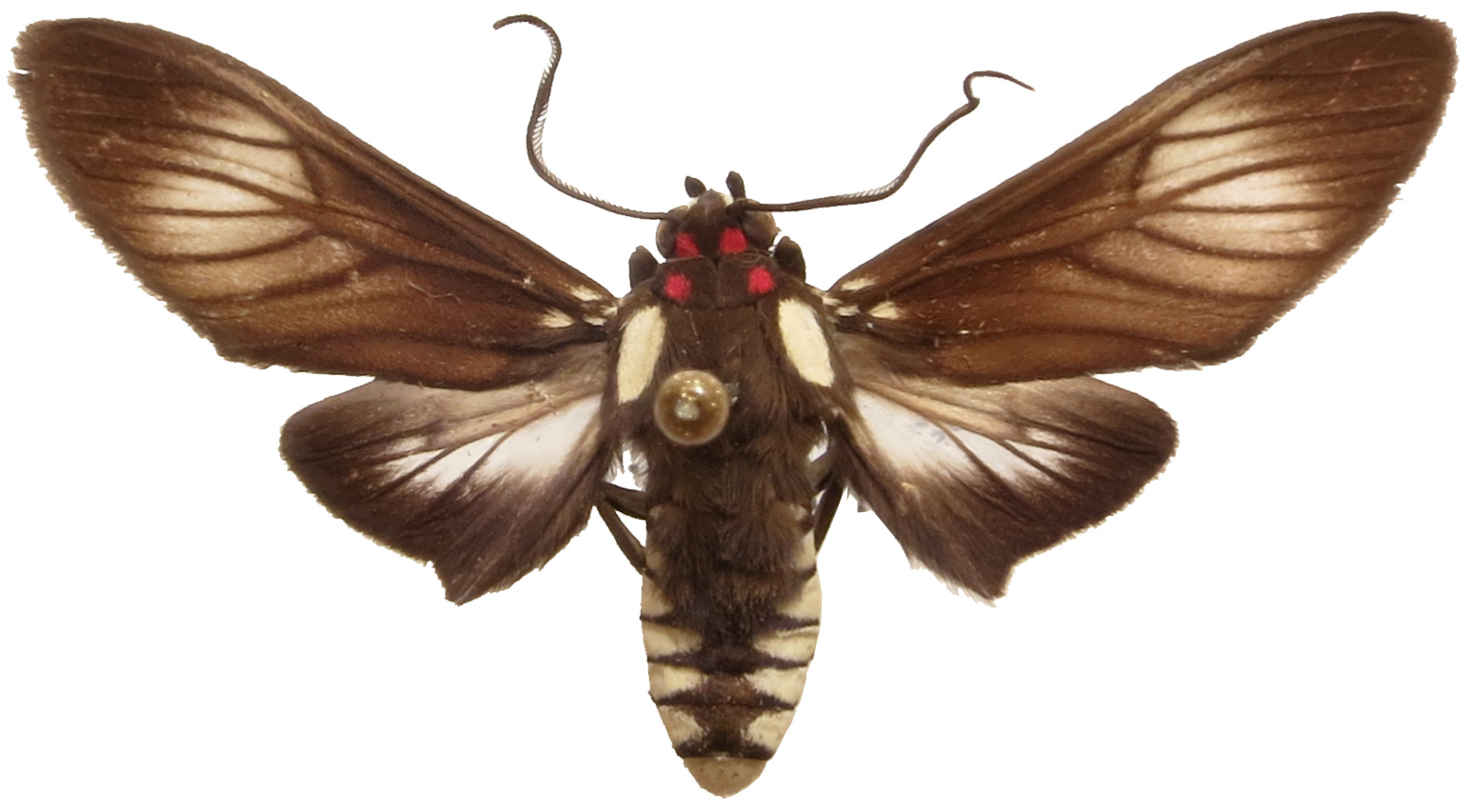
- Telioneura glaucopis

Scientific classification
- Kingdom: Animalia
- Phylum: Arthropoda
- Class: Insecta
- Order: Lepidoptera
- Superfamily: Noctuoidea
- Family: Erebidae
- Subfamily: Arctiinae
- Genus: Telioneura; Felder, 1874

Synonyms
- Teucer Kirby, 1892 (unnec. repl.)

= Telioneura =

Genus of moths

Telioneura is a genus of moths in the subfamily Arctiinae. The genus was described by Felder in 1874.

== Species ==
- Telioneura albapex Druce, 1898
- Telioneura approximans Rothschild, 1922
- Telioneura ateucer Dyar, 1914
- Telioneura brevipennis Butler, 1877
- Telioneura fuliginosa Rothschild, 1910
- Telioneura glaucopis Felder, 1869
- Telioneura hypophaea Hampson, 1905
- Telioneura imbecillus Zerny, 1931
- Telioneura jocelynae Toulgoët, 1987
- Telioneura obsoleta Draudt, 1915
- Telioneura rosada Dognin
- Telioneura subplena Walker, 1854

== Former species ==
- Telioneura carmania Druce, 1883
