= Telioneura hypophaea =

Scientific classification
- Kingdom: Animalia
- Phylum: Arthropoda
- Clade: Pancrustacea
- Class: Insecta
- Order: Lepidoptera
- Superfamily: Noctuoidea
- Family: Erebidae
- Subfamily: Arctiinae
- Genus: Telioneura
- Species: T. hypophaea

Binomial name
- Telioneura hypophaea Hampson, 1905

Synonyms
- Telioneura hypophaea f. germana Rothschild, 1911

Species of moth

Telioneura hypophaea is a moth in the subfamily Arctiinae. It was described by George Hampson in 1905. It is found in Venezuela.
