= Ecdemus obscuratus =

Scientific classification
- Kingdom: Animalia
- Phylum: Arthropoda
- Class: Insecta
- Order: Lepidoptera
- Superfamily: Noctuoidea
- Family: Erebidae
- Subfamily: Arctiinae
- Genus: Ecdemus
- Species: E. obscuratus

Binomial name
- Ecdemus obscuratus Schaus, 1911

Species of moth

Ecdemus obscuratus is a moth of the subfamily Arctiinae. It was described by William Schaus in 1911. It is found in Costa Rica and Honduras.
