= Telioneura ateucer =

Scientific classification
- Kingdom: Animalia
- Phylum: Arthropoda
- Clade: Pancrustacea
- Class: Insecta
- Order: Lepidoptera
- Superfamily: Noctuoidea
- Family: Erebidae
- Subfamily: Arctiinae
- Genus: Telioneura
- Species: T. ateucer

Binomial name
- Telioneura ateucer (Dyar, 1914)

Synonyms
- Teucer ateucer Dyar, 1914

Species of moth

Telioneura ateucer is a moth in the subfamily Arctiinae. It was described by Harrison Gray Dyar Jr. in 1914. It is found in Panama.
