= Ecdemus =

Scientific classification
- Kingdom: Animalia
- Phylum: Arthropoda
- Class: Insecta
- Order: Lepidoptera
- Superfamily: Noctuoidea
- Family: Erebidae
- Subfamily: Arctiinae
- Genus: Ecdemus; Herrich-Schäffer, [1855]

Genus of moths

Ecdemus is a genus of moths in the subfamily Arctiinae. The genus was erected by Gottlieb August Wilhelm Herrich-Schäffer in 1855.

== Species ==
- Ecdemus carmania (Druce, 1883)
- Ecdemus hypoleuca Herrich-Schäffer, [1855]
- Ecdemus obscuratus Schaus, 1911
