= Telioneura albapex =

Scientific classification
- Kingdom: Animalia
- Phylum: Arthropoda
- Clade: Pancrustacea
- Class: Insecta
- Order: Lepidoptera
- Superfamily: Noctuoidea
- Family: Erebidae
- Subfamily: Arctiinae
- Genus: Telioneura
- Species: T. albapex

Binomial name
- Telioneura albapex H. Druce, 1898

Species of moth

Telioneura albapex is a moth in the subfamily Arctiinae. It was described by Herbert Druce in 1898. It is found in the northern Atlantic coast of South America in French Guiana.
