= Telioneura approximans =

Scientific classification
- Kingdom: Animalia
- Phylum: Arthropoda
- Clade: Pancrustacea
- Class: Insecta
- Order: Lepidoptera
- Superfamily: Noctuoidea
- Family: Erebidae
- Subfamily: Arctiinae
- Genus: Telioneura
- Species: T. approximans

Binomial name
- Telioneura approximans (Rothschild, 1922)

Synonyms
- Automolis approximans Rothschild, 1922

Species of moth

Telioneura approximans is a moth in the subfamily Arctiinae. It was described by Rothschild in 1922. It is found in Peru.
