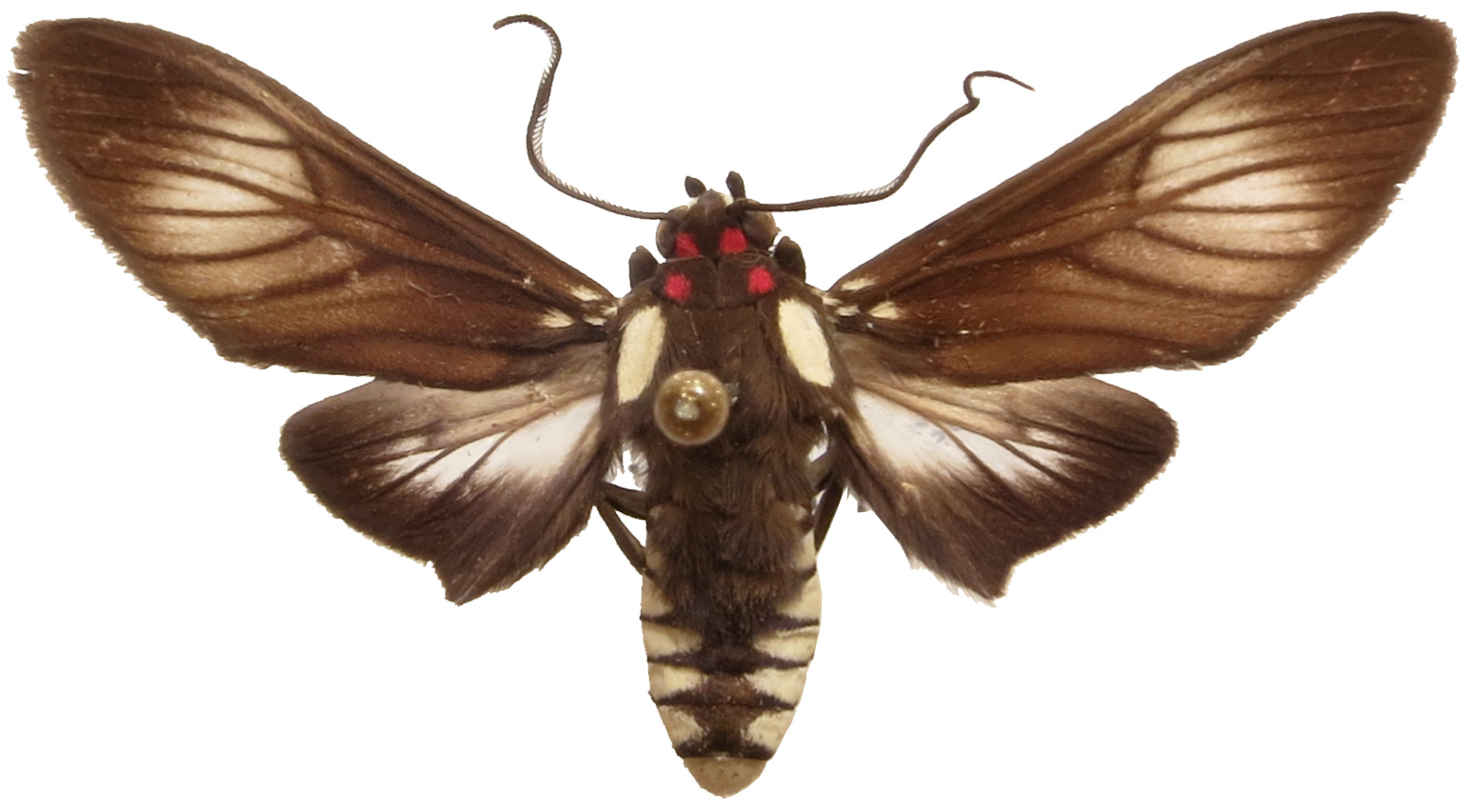
- From French Guiana

Scientific classification
- Kingdom: Animalia
- Phylum: Arthropoda
- Clade: Pancrustacea
- Class: Insecta
- Order: Lepidoptera
- Superfamily: Noctuoidea
- Family: Erebidae
- Subfamily: Arctiinae
- Genus: Telioneura
- Species: T. glaucopis

Binomial name
- Telioneura glaucopis Felder, 1869

= Telioneura glaucopis =

Species of moth

Telioneura glaucopis is a moth in the subfamily Arctiinae. It was described by Felder in 1869. It is found in the Amazon region.
