= Telioneura imbecillus =

Scientific classification
- Kingdom: Animalia
- Phylum: Arthropoda
- Class: Insecta
- Order: Lepidoptera
- Superfamily: Noctuoidea
- Family: Erebidae
- Subfamily: Arctiinae
- Genus: Telioneura
- Species: T. imbecillus

Binomial name
- Telioneura imbecillus (Zerny, 1931)

Synonyms
- Teucer imbecillus Zerny, 1931

Species of moth

Telioneura imbecillus is a moth in the subfamily Arctiinae. It was described by Zerny in 1931. It is found in Brazil.
