= Telioneura rosada =

Scientific classification
- Kingdom: Animalia
- Phylum: Arthropoda
- Clade: Pancrustacea
- Class: Insecta
- Order: Lepidoptera
- Superfamily: Noctuoidea
- Family: Erebidae
- Subfamily: Arctiinae
- Genus: Telioneura
- Species: T. rosada

Binomial name
- Telioneura rosada (Dognin, 1895)

Synonyms
- Ardonca rosada Dognin, 1895; Teucer rosada; Telioneura rosada f. puelengei Dognin

Species of moth

Telioneura rosada is a moth in the subfamily Arctiinae. It was described by Paul Dognin in 1895. It appears as a pink-tinged brown moth, with a set of wings and a pair of long antennae. It is found in Ecuador.
