= Telioneura brevipennis =

Scientific classification
- Kingdom: Animalia
- Phylum: Arthropoda
- Clade: Pancrustacea
- Class: Insecta
- Order: Lepidoptera
- Superfamily: Noctuoidea
- Family: Erebidae
- Subfamily: Arctiinae
- Genus: Telioneura
- Species: T. brevipennis

Binomial name
- Telioneura brevipennis Butler, 1877

Synonyms
- Laguerrellus brevipennis

Species of moth

Telioneura brevipennis is a moth in the subfamily Arctiinae. It was described by Arthur Gardiner Butler in 1877. It is found in the Amazon region.
