= Telioneura fuliginosa =

Scientific classification
- Kingdom: Animalia
- Phylum: Arthropoda
- Clade: Pancrustacea
- Class: Insecta
- Order: Lepidoptera
- Superfamily: Noctuoidea
- Family: Erebidae
- Subfamily: Arctiinae
- Genus: Telioneura
- Species: T. fuliginosa

Binomial name
- Telioneura fuliginosa Rothschild, 1910

Species of moth

Telioneura fuliginosa is a moth in the subfamily Arctiinae. It was described by Rothschild in 1910. It is found in the Amazon region.
