= Telioneura jocelynae =

Scientific classification
- Kingdom: Animalia
- Phylum: Arthropoda
- Class: Insecta
- Order: Lepidoptera
- Superfamily: Noctuoidea
- Family: Erebidae
- Subfamily: Arctiinae
- Genus: Telioneura
- Species: T. jocelynae

Binomial name
- Telioneura jocelynae Toulgoët, 1987

Species of moth

Telioneura jocelynae is a moth in the subfamily Arctiinae. It was described by Hervé de Toulgoët in 1987. It is found in French Guiana.
