= Telioneura obsoleta =

Scientific classification
- Kingdom: Animalia
- Phylum: Arthropoda
- Class: Insecta
- Order: Lepidoptera
- Superfamily: Noctuoidea
- Family: Erebidae
- Subfamily: Arctiinae
- Genus: Telioneura
- Species: T. obsoleta

Binomial name
- Telioneura obsoleta Draudt, 1915

Species of moth

Telioneura obsoleta is a moth in the subfamily Arctiinae. It was described by Max Wilhelm Karl Draudt in 1915.
