= Telioneura subplena =

Scientific classification
- Kingdom: Animalia
- Phylum: Arthropoda
- Clade: Pancrustacea
- Class: Insecta
- Order: Lepidoptera
- Superfamily: Noctuoidea
- Family: Erebidae
- Subfamily: Arctiinae
- Genus: Telioneura
- Species: T. subplena

Binomial name
- Telioneura subplena (Walker, 1854)

Synonyms
- Euchromia subplena Walker, 1854

Species of moth

Telioneura subplena is a moth in the subfamily Arctiinae. It was described by Francis Walker in 1854. It is found in Rio de Janeiro, Brazil.
