= Ecdemus carmania =

Scientific classification
- Domain: Eukaryota
- Kingdom: Animalia
- Phylum: Arthropoda
- Class: Insecta
- Order: Lepidoptera
- Superfamily: Noctuoidea
- Family: Erebidae
- Subfamily: Arctiinae
- Genus: Ecdemus
- Species: E. carmania

Binomial name
- Ecdemus carmania (H. Druce, 1883)

Synonyms
- Pezaptera carmania H. Druce, 1883; Teucer carmania; Telioneura carmania

Species of moth

Ecdemus carmania is a moth of the subfamily Arctiinae first described by Herbert Druce in 1883. It is found in Ecuador.
