= Syntrichura sphecomorpha =

Scientific classification
- Kingdom: Animalia
- Phylum: Arthropoda
- Clade: Pancrustacea
- Class: Insecta
- Order: Lepidoptera
- Superfamily: Noctuoidea
- Family: Erebidae
- Subfamily: Arctiinae
- Genus: Syntrichura
- Species: S. sphecomorpha

Binomial name
- Syntrichura sphecomorpha Bryk, 1953

Species of moth

Syntrichura sphecomorpha is a moth in the subfamily Arctiinae. It was described by Felix Bryk in 1953. It is found in the Amazon region.
