= Syntrichura placida =

Scientific classification
- Kingdom: Animalia
- Phylum: Arthropoda
- Clade: Pancrustacea
- Class: Insecta
- Order: Lepidoptera
- Superfamily: Noctuoidea
- Family: Erebidae
- Subfamily: Arctiinae
- Genus: Syntrichura
- Species: S. placida

Binomial name
- Syntrichura placida H. Druce, 1884

Species of moth

Syntrichura placida is a moth in the subfamily Arctiinae. It was described by Herbert Druce in 1884. It is found in Guatemala.
