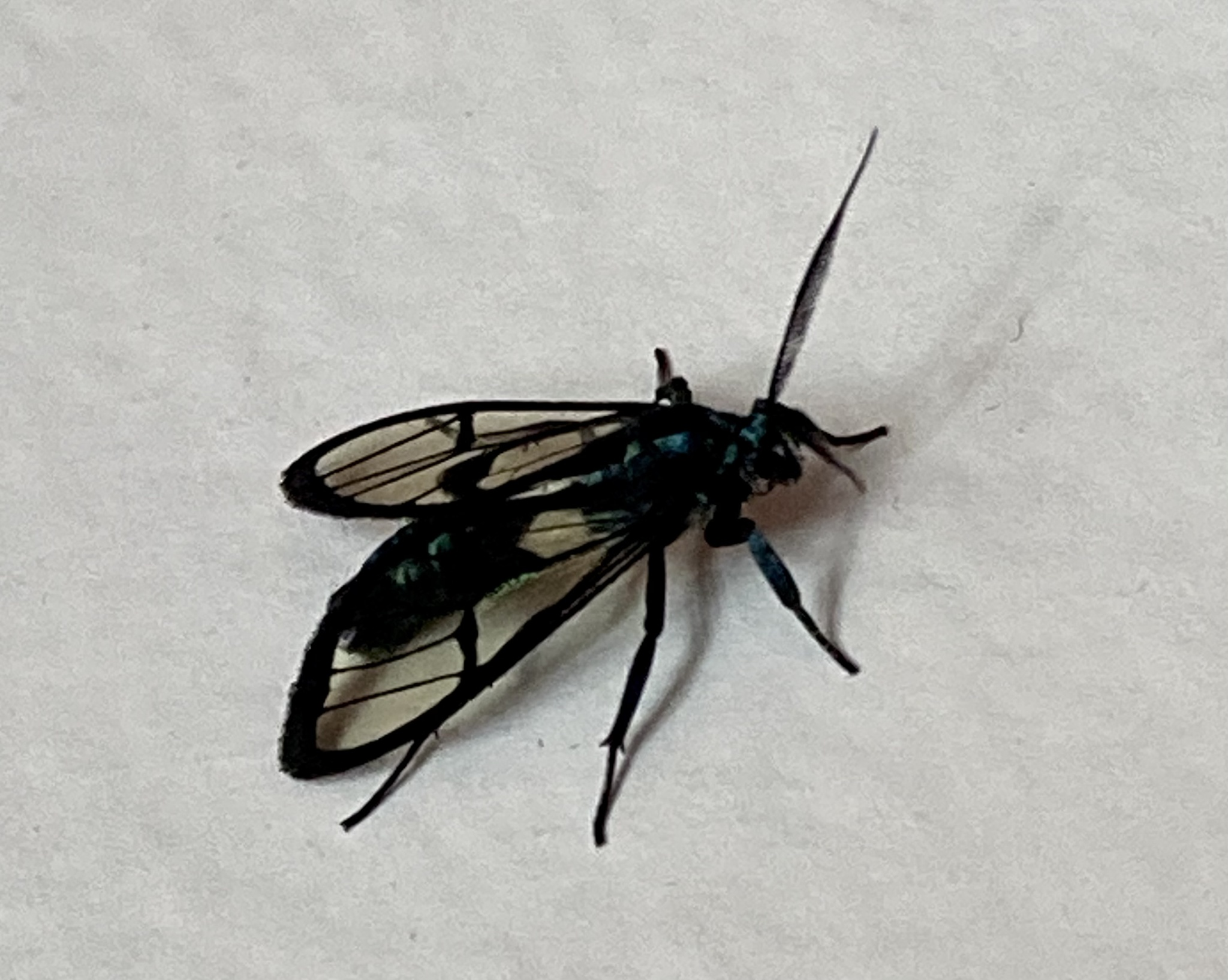
- Syntrichura virens

Scientific classification
- Domain: Eukaryota
- Kingdom: Animalia
- Phylum: Arthropoda
- Class: Insecta
- Order: Lepidoptera
- Superfamily: Noctuoidea
- Family: Erebidae
- Subfamily: Arctiinae
- Genus: Syntrichura; Butler, 1876

= Syntrichura =

Genus of moths

Syntrichura is a genus of moths in the subfamily Arctiinae.

== Species ==
- Syntrichura melaena Dognin, 1907
- Syntrichura placida Druce, 1884
- Syntrichura sphecomorpha Bryk, 1953
- Syntrichura virens Butler, 1876
