= Syntrichura melaena =

Scientific classification
- Kingdom: Animalia
- Phylum: Arthropoda
- Clade: Pancrustacea
- Class: Insecta
- Order: Lepidoptera
- Superfamily: Noctuoidea
- Family: Erebidae
- Subfamily: Arctiinae
- Genus: Syntrichura
- Species: S. melaena

Binomial name
- Syntrichura melaena Dognin, 1907

Species of moth

Syntrichura melaena is a moth in the subfamily Arctiinae. It was described by Paul Dognin in 1907. It is found in Peru.
