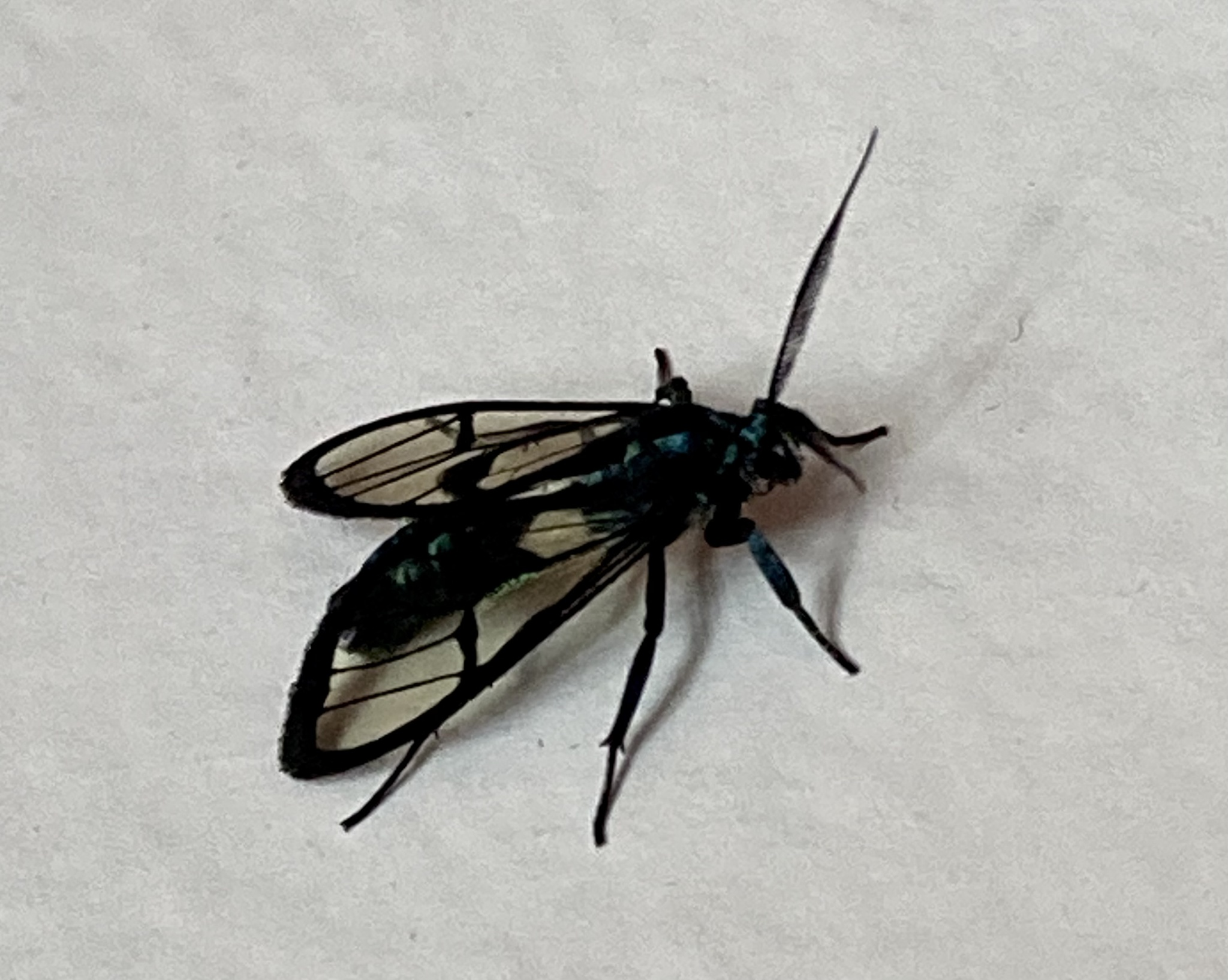

Scientific classification
- Domain: Eukaryota
- Kingdom: Animalia
- Phylum: Arthropoda
- Class: Insecta
- Order: Lepidoptera
- Superfamily: Noctuoidea
- Family: Erebidae
- Subfamily: Arctiinae
- Genus: Syntrichura
- Species: S. virens

Binomial name
- Syntrichura virens Butler, 1876

Synonyms
- Syntrichura reba Druce, 1896

= Syntrichura virens =

Species of moth

Syntrichura virens is a moth in the subfamily Arctiinae. It was first described by Arthur Gardiner Butler in 1876. It is found in Brazil (São Paulo), Panama and Colombia.

== Subspecies ==
- Syntrichura virens virens (Brazil)
- Syntrichura virens reba Druce, 1896 (Panama, Colombia)
