= Cacostatia =

Scientific classification
- Kingdom: Animalia
- Phylum: Arthropoda
- Class: Insecta
- Order: Lepidoptera
- Superfamily: Noctuoidea
- Family: Erebidae
- Subfamily: Arctiinae
- Genus: Cacostatia; Hampson, 1898

Genus of moths

Cacostatia is a genus of moths in the subfamily Arctiinae.

== Species ==
- Cacostatia acutipennis Rothschild, 1912
- Cacostatia buckwaldi Rothschild, 1912
- Cacostatia discalis (Walker, 1856)
- Cacostatia flaviventralis Dognin, 1909
- Cacostatia germana Rothschild, 1912
- Cacostatia ossa (Druce, 1893)
- Cacostatia saphira (Staudinger, 1875)
