= Cacostatia acutipennis =

Scientific classification
- Domain: Eukaryota
- Kingdom: Animalia
- Phylum: Arthropoda
- Class: Insecta
- Order: Lepidoptera
- Superfamily: Noctuoidea
- Family: Erebidae
- Subfamily: Arctiinae
- Genus: Cacostatia
- Species: C. acutipennis

Binomial name
- Cacostatia acutipennis (Rothschild, 1912)

Synonyms
- Agyrta acutipennis Rothschild, 1912

Species of moth

Cacostatia acutipennis is a moth of the subfamily Arctiinae. It was described by Rothschild in 1912. It is found in Colombia.

The wingspan is about 42 mm. The forewings are black-brown slightly glossed with blue. The hindwings are hyaline.
