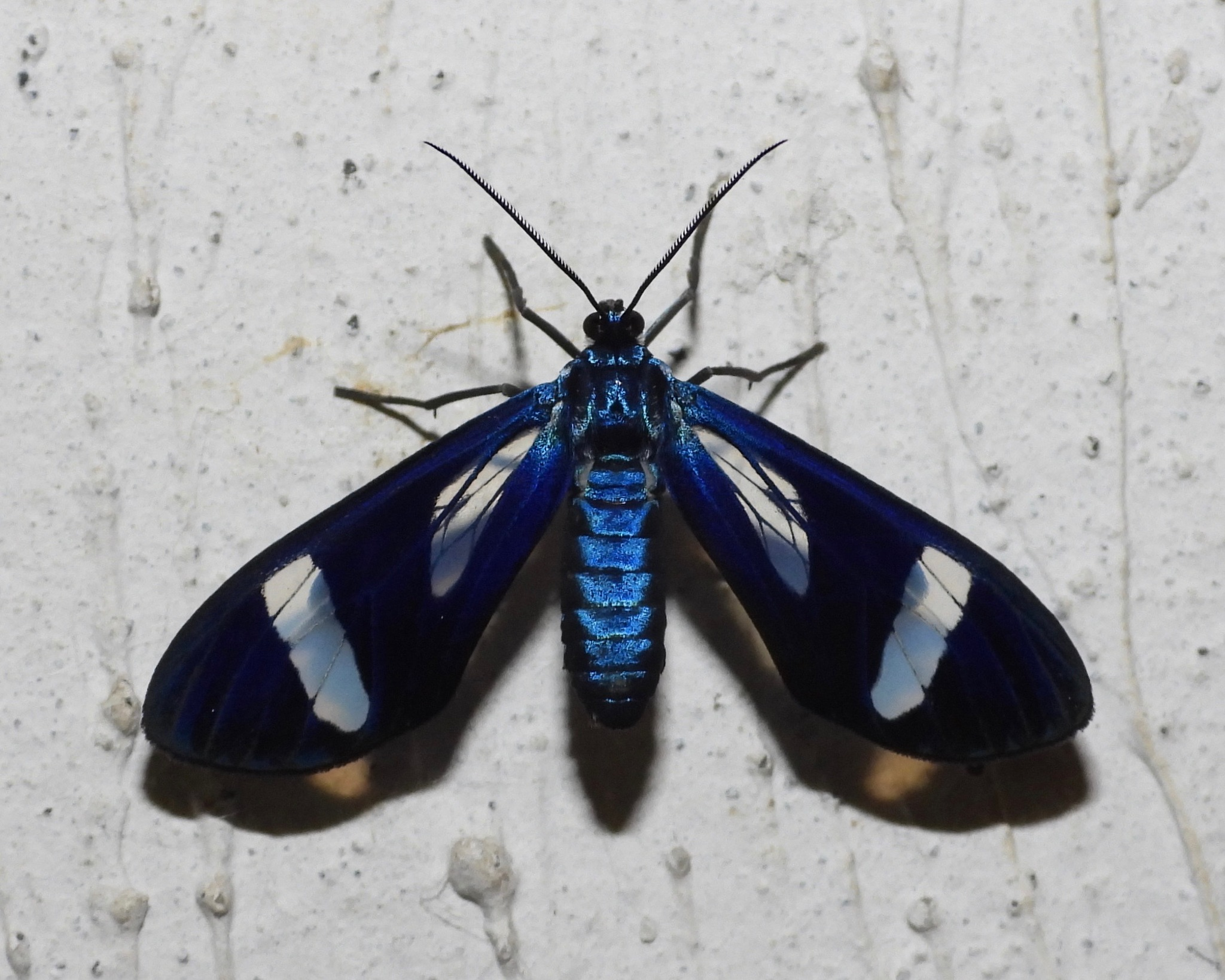

Scientific classification
- Domain: Eukaryota
- Kingdom: Animalia
- Phylum: Arthropoda
- Class: Insecta
- Order: Lepidoptera
- Superfamily: Noctuoidea
- Family: Erebidae
- Subfamily: Arctiinae
- Genus: Cacostatia
- Species: C. saphira

Binomial name
- Cacostatia saphira (Staudinger, 1875)

Synonyms
- Agyrta saphira Staudinger, 1876

= Cacostatia saphira =

Species of moth

Cacostatia saphira is a species of moth in the subfamily Arctiinae. It was first described by Otto Staudinger in 1875. It is found in Mexico, Guatemala and Panama.
