= Cacostatia ossa =

Scientific classification
- Domain: Eukaryota
- Kingdom: Animalia
- Phylum: Arthropoda
- Class: Insecta
- Order: Lepidoptera
- Superfamily: Noctuoidea
- Family: Erebidae
- Subfamily: Arctiinae
- Genus: Cacostatia
- Species: C. ossa

Binomial name
- Cacostatia ossa (H. Druce, 1893)

Synonyms
- Metastatia ossa H. Druce, 1893

Species of moth

Cacostatia ossa is a moth of the subfamily Arctiinae. It was described by Herbert Druce in 1893. It is found in French Guiana, Guyana, and Colombia.
