= Cacostatia germana =

Scientific classification
- Domain: Eukaryota
- Kingdom: Animalia
- Phylum: Arthropoda
- Class: Insecta
- Order: Lepidoptera
- Superfamily: Noctuoidea
- Family: Erebidae
- Subfamily: Arctiinae
- Genus: Cacostatia
- Species: C. germana

Binomial name
- Cacostatia germana (Rothschild, 1912)

Synonyms
- Argyrta germana Rothschild, 1912

Species of moth

Cacostatia germana is a moth of the subfamily Arctiinae. It was described by Rothschild in 1912. It is found in Panama and Venezuela.

The wingspan is 34–36 mm. The forewings are black suffused with blue. The hindwings are black suffused with blue.
