= Cacostatia flaviventralis =

Scientific classification
- Domain: Eukaryota
- Kingdom: Animalia
- Phylum: Arthropoda
- Class: Insecta
- Order: Lepidoptera
- Superfamily: Noctuoidea
- Family: Erebidae
- Subfamily: Arctiinae
- Genus: Cacostatia
- Species: C. flaviventralis

Binomial name
- Cacostatia flaviventralis Dognin, 1909

Species of moth

Cacostatia flaviventralis is a moth of the subfamily Arctiinae. It was described by Paul Dognin in 1909. It is found in Colombia.

The wingspan is about 48 mm. The forewings are black with some metallic blue suffusion at the base. The hindwings are hyaline (glasslike).
