= Cacostatia discalis =

Scientific classification
- Kingdom: Animalia
- Phylum: Arthropoda
- Class: Insecta
- Order: Lepidoptera
- Superfamily: Noctuoidea
- Family: Erebidae
- Subfamily: Arctiinae
- Genus: Cacostatia
- Species: C. discalis

Binomial name
- Cacostatia discalis (Walker, 1856)

Synonyms
- Euagra discalis Walker, 1856

Species of moth

Cacostatia discalis is a moth of the subfamily Arctiinae. It was described by Francis Walker in 1856. It is found in the Amazon region.
