= Fabresema cheesmanae =

Scientific classification
- Kingdom: Animalia
- Phylum: Arthropoda
- Clade: Pancrustacea
- Class: Insecta
- Order: Lepidoptera
- Superfamily: Noctuoidea
- Family: Erebidae
- Subfamily: Arctiinae
- Genus: Fabresema
- Species: F. cheesmanae

Binomial name
- Fabresema cheesmanae Holloway, 1979

Species of moth

Fabresema cheesmanae is a moth of the subfamily Arctiinae. It was described by Jeremy Daniel Holloway in 1979. It is found in New Caledonia.
