= Fabresema =

Scientific classification
- Kingdom: Animalia
- Phylum: Arthropoda
- Clade: Pancrustacea
- Class: Insecta
- Order: Lepidoptera
- Superfamily: Noctuoidea
- Family: Erebidae
- Subfamily: Arctiinae
- Tribe: Lithosiini
- Genus: Fabresema; Holloway, 1979

Genus of moths

Fabresema is a genus of moths in the subfamily Arctiinae. The genus was erected by Jeremy Daniel Holloway in 1979.

== Species ==
- Fabresema bicornuta Holloway, 1979
- Fabresema catherinae Holloway, 1979
- Fabresema cheesmanae Holloway, 1979
- Fabresema costiplaga Holloway, 1979
- Fabresema elisabethae Holloway, 1979
- Fabresema flavibasalis Holloway, 1979
- Fabresema gerardi Holloway, 1979
- Fabresema grisea Holloway, 1979
- Fabresema obliqua Holloway, 1979
- Fabresema sarramea Holloway, 1979
- Fabresema suffusa Holloway, 1979
- Fabresema sylviae Holloway, 1979
- Fabresema toma Holloway, 1979
- Fabresema valeriae Holloway, 1979
