= Pompiliodes albomarginata =

Scientific classification
- Domain: Eukaryota
- Kingdom: Animalia
- Phylum: Arthropoda
- Class: Insecta
- Order: Lepidoptera
- Superfamily: Noctuoidea
- Family: Erebidae
- Subfamily: Arctiinae
- Genus: Pompiliodes
- Species: P. albomarginata

Binomial name
- Pompiliodes albomarginata (H. Druce, 1884)

Synonyms
- Amycles albomarginata H. Druce, 1884

Species of insect

Pompiliodes albomarginata is a moth in the subfamily Arctiinae. It was described by Herbert Druce in 1884. It is found in Panama.
