= Pompiliodes obliqua =

Scientific classification
- Domain: Eukaryota
- Kingdom: Animalia
- Phylum: Arthropoda
- Class: Insecta
- Order: Lepidoptera
- Superfamily: Noctuoidea
- Family: Erebidae
- Subfamily: Arctiinae
- Genus: Pompiliodes
- Species: P. obliqua

Binomial name
- Pompiliodes obliqua Hampson, 1914

Species of insect

Pompiliodes obliqua is a moth in the subfamily Arctiinae. It was described by George Hampson in 1914. It is found in Ecuador.
