= Pompiliodes tenebrosa =

Scientific classification
- Kingdom: Animalia
- Phylum: Arthropoda
- Class: Insecta
- Order: Lepidoptera
- Superfamily: Noctuoidea
- Family: Erebidae
- Subfamily: Arctiinae
- Genus: Pompiliodes
- Species: P. tenebrosa

Binomial name
- Pompiliodes tenebrosa (Walker, 1854)

Synonyms
- Euchromia tenebrosa Walker, 1854

Species of insect

Pompiliodes tenebrosa is a moth in the subfamily Arctiinae. It was described by Francis Walker in 1854. It is found in Pará, Brazil.
