= Pompiliodes postica =

Scientific classification
- Kingdom: Animalia
- Phylum: Arthropoda
- Class: Insecta
- Order: Lepidoptera
- Superfamily: Noctuoidea
- Family: Erebidae
- Subfamily: Arctiinae
- Genus: Pompiliodes
- Species: P. postica

Binomial name
- Pompiliodes postica (Walker, 1856)

Synonyms
- Pampa postica Walker, 1856; Amycles postica

Species of insect

Pompiliodes postica is a moth in the subfamily Arctiinae. It was described by Francis Walker in 1856. It is found in Panama and the Amazon region.
