= Pompiliodes aliena =

Scientific classification
- Kingdom: Animalia
- Phylum: Arthropoda
- Class: Insecta
- Order: Lepidoptera
- Superfamily: Noctuoidea
- Family: Erebidae
- Subfamily: Arctiinae
- Genus: Pompiliodes
- Species: P. aliena

Binomial name
- Pompiliodes aliena (Walker, 1854)

Synonyms
- Euchromia aliena Walker, 1854; Amycles flavifascia Herrich-Schäffer, [1855]; Pampa flavifascia

Species of insect

Pompiliodes aliena is a moth in the subfamily Arctiinae. It was described by Francis Walker in 1854. It is found in Guatemala and Brazil (Para, Ega).
