= Pompiliodes acroleuca =

Scientific classification
- Domain: Eukaryota
- Kingdom: Animalia
- Phylum: Arthropoda
- Class: Insecta
- Order: Lepidoptera
- Superfamily: Noctuoidea
- Family: Erebidae
- Subfamily: Arctiinae
- Genus: Pompiliodes
- Species: P. acroleuca

Binomial name
- Pompiliodes acroleuca Zerny, 1931

Species of moth

Pompiliodes acroleuca is a moth in the subfamily Arctiinae. It was described by Zerny in 1931. It is found in Bolivia.
