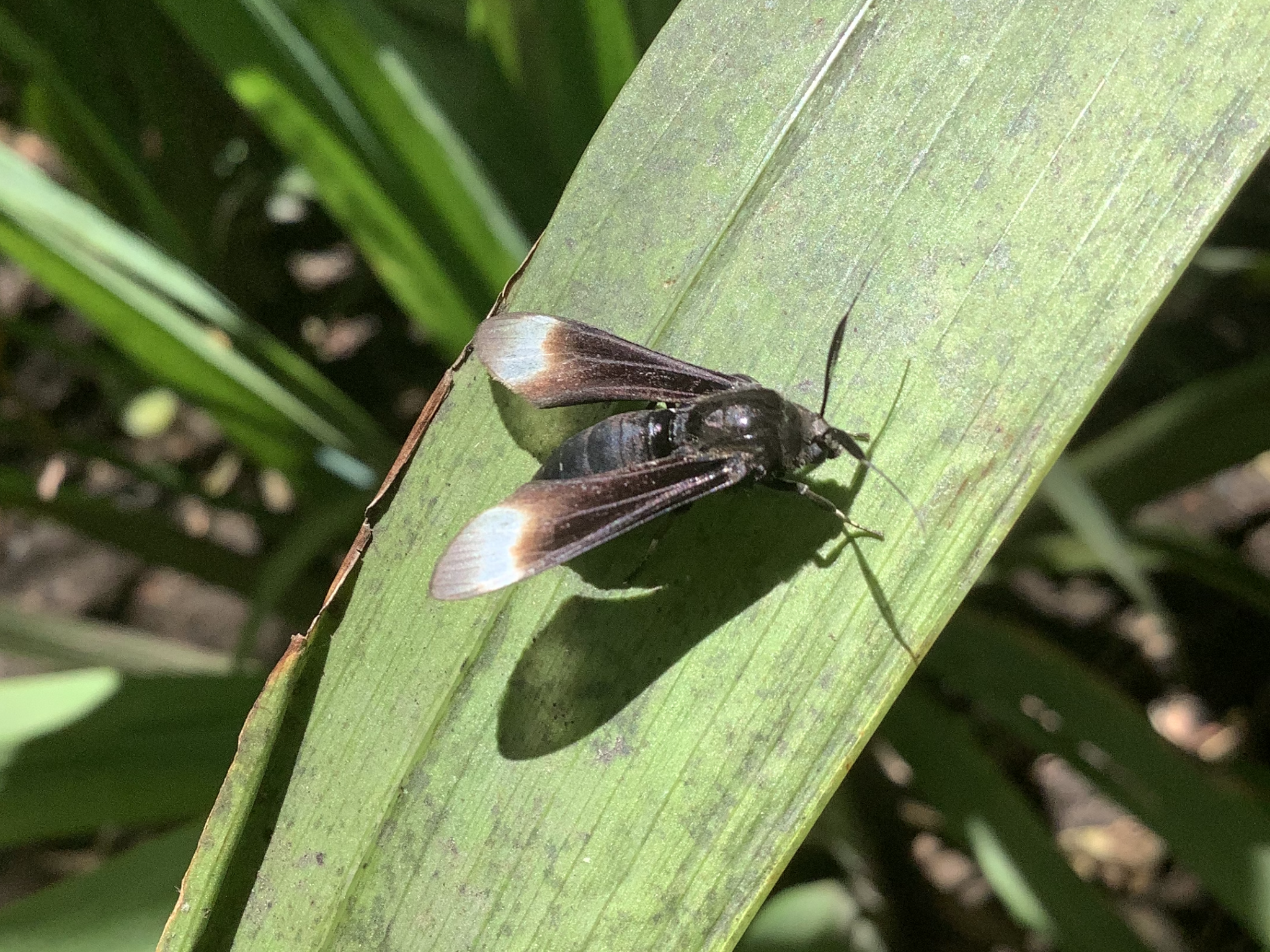
- Pompiliodes sp.

Scientific classification
- Domain: Eukaryota
- Kingdom: Animalia
- Phylum: Arthropoda
- Class: Insecta
- Order: Lepidoptera
- Superfamily: Noctuoidea
- Family: Erebidae
- Subfamily: Arctiinae
- Genus: Pompiliodes; Hampson, 1898

= Pompiliodes =

Genus of insects

Pompiliodes is a genus of moths in the subfamily Arctiinae. The genus was erected by George Hampson in 1898.

== Species ==
- Pompiliodes acroleuca Zerny, 1931
- Pompiliodes albomarginata (Druce, 1884)
- Pompiliodes aliena Walker, 1854
- Pompiliodes obliqua Hampson, 1914
- Pompiliodes postica Walker, 1856
- Pompiliodes tenebrosa Walker, 1854
