= Methysia =

Scientific classification
- Domain: Eukaryota
- Kingdom: Animalia
- Phylum: Arthropoda
- Class: Insecta
- Order: Lepidoptera
- Superfamily: Noctuoidea
- Family: Erebidae
- Subfamily: Arctiinae
- Genus: Methysia; Butler, 1876

Genus of moths

Methysia is a genus of moths in the subfamily Arctiinae. The genus was erected by Arthur Gardiner Butler in 1876.

== Species ==
- Methysia melanota Hampson, 1909
- Methysia notabilis Walker, 1854

== Former species ==
- Methysia aenetus Schaus, 1896
