= Metamya flavia =

Scientific classification
- Domain: Eukaryota
- Kingdom: Animalia
- Phylum: Arthropoda
- Class: Insecta
- Order: Lepidoptera
- Superfamily: Noctuoidea
- Family: Erebidae
- Subfamily: Arctiinae
- Genus: Metamya
- Species: M. flavia

Binomial name
- Metamya flavia (Schaus, 1898)

Synonyms
- Paramya flavia Schaus, 1898

Species of moth

Metamya flavia is a moth of the subfamily Arctiinae. It was described by Schaus in 1898. It is found in Paraná, Brazil.
