= Methysia notabilis =

Scientific classification
- Kingdom: Animalia
- Phylum: Arthropoda
- Class: Insecta
- Order: Lepidoptera
- Superfamily: Noctuoidea
- Family: Erebidae
- Subfamily: Arctiinae
- Genus: Methysia
- Species: M. notabilis

Binomial name
- Methysia notabilis (Walker, 1854)

Synonyms
- Glaucopis notabilis Walker, 1854

Species of moth

Methysia notabilis is a moth of the subfamily Arctiinae. It was first described by Francis Walker in 1854. It is found in Pará, Brazil.
