= Metamya bricenoi =

Scientific classification
- Domain: Eukaryota
- Kingdom: Animalia
- Phylum: Arthropoda
- Class: Insecta
- Order: Lepidoptera
- Superfamily: Noctuoidea
- Family: Erebidae
- Subfamily: Arctiinae
- Genus: Metamya
- Species: M. bricenoi

Binomial name
- Metamya bricenoi (Rothschild, 1911)

Synonyms
- Ichoria bricenoi Rothschild, 1911

Species of moth

Metamya bricenoi is a moth of the subfamily Arctiinae. It was described by Rothschild in 1911. It is found in Venezuela.

The wingspan is about 30 mm. The forewings are hyaline with black-brown veins and margins. The basal area is black-brown with a subbasal crimson point below the costa. There is a large black-brown discoidal patch conjoined to the costal area. The terminal band expands widely on the apical area and slightly below vein two. The hindwings are hyaline with black-brown veins and margins. The terminal band expands towards the apex and into a patch at the tornus.
