= Metamya intersecta =

Scientific classification
- Kingdom: Animalia
- Phylum: Arthropoda
- Class: Insecta
- Order: Lepidoptera
- Superfamily: Noctuoidea
- Family: Erebidae
- Subfamily: Arctiinae
- Genus: Metamya
- Species: M. intersecta

Binomial name
- Metamya intersecta (Hampson, 1898)

Synonyms
- Paramya intersecta Hampson, 1898

Species of moth

Metamya intersecta is a moth of the subfamily Arctiinae. It was described by George Hampson in 1898. It is found in Pará, Brazil.
