= Metamya chrysonota =

Scientific classification
- Kingdom: Animalia
- Phylum: Arthropoda
- Clade: Pancrustacea
- Class: Insecta
- Order: Lepidoptera
- Superfamily: Noctuoidea
- Family: Erebidae
- Subfamily: Arctiinae
- Genus: Metamya
- Species: M. chrysonota

Binomial name
- Metamya chrysonota Hampson, 1898

Synonyms
- Paramya chrysonota Hampson, 1898

Species of moth

Metamya chrysonota is a moth of the subfamily Arctiinae. It was described by George Hampson in 1898. It is found in the Amazon region.
