= Metamya picta =

Scientific classification
- Domain: Eukaryota
- Kingdom: Animalia
- Phylum: Arthropoda
- Class: Insecta
- Order: Lepidoptera
- Superfamily: Noctuoidea
- Family: Erebidae
- Subfamily: Arctiinae
- Genus: Metamya
- Species: M. picta

Binomial name
- Metamya picta (H. Druce, 1898)

Synonyms
- Paramya picta H. Druce, 1898

Species of moth

Metamya picta is a moth of the subfamily Arctiinae. It was described by Herbert Druce in 1898. It is found in French Guiana.
