= Methysia melanota =

Scientific classification
- Kingdom: Animalia
- Phylum: Arthropoda
- Class: Insecta
- Order: Lepidoptera
- Superfamily: Noctuoidea
- Family: Erebidae
- Subfamily: Arctiinae
- Genus: Methysia
- Species: M. melanota

Binomial name
- Methysia melanota (Hampson, 1909)

Species of moth

Methysia melanota is a moth of the subfamily Arctiinae. It was described by George Hampson in 1909. It is found in Peru.
