= Metamya =

Scientific classification
- Domain: Eukaryota
- Kingdom: Animalia
- Phylum: Arthropoda
- Class: Insecta
- Order: Lepidoptera
- Superfamily: Noctuoidea
- Family: Erebidae
- Subfamily: Arctiinae
- Genus: Metamya; Travassos, 1946

Synonyms
- Paramya Druce, 1898 (preocc. Condrad, 1860); Paramya Hampson, 1898

Genus of moths

Metamya is a genus of moths in the subfamily Arctiinae. The genus was described by Travassos in 1946.

== Species ==
- Metamya aenetus (Schaus, 1896)
- Metamya bricenoi Rothschild, 1911
- Metamya chrysonota Hampson, 1898
- Metamya flavia Schaus, 1898
- Metamya picta Druce, 1895
- Metamya intersecta Hampson, 1898
