= Metamya aenetus =

Scientific classification
- Domain: Eukaryota
- Kingdom: Animalia
- Phylum: Arthropoda
- Class: Insecta
- Order: Lepidoptera
- Superfamily: Noctuoidea
- Family: Erebidae
- Subfamily: Arctiinae
- Genus: Metamya
- Species: M. aenetus

Binomial name
- Metamya aenetus (Schaus, 1896)

Synonyms
- Chloropsinus aenetus Schaus, 1896; Paramya aenetus; Methysia aenetus (Schaus, 1896)

Species of moth

Metamya aenetus is a moth of the subfamily Arctiinae. It was described by Schaus in 1896. It is found in Paraná, Brazil.
