= Eumenogaster =

Scientific classification
- Domain: Eukaryota
- Kingdom: Animalia
- Phylum: Arthropoda
- Class: Insecta
- Order: Lepidoptera
- Superfamily: Noctuoidea
- Family: Erebidae
- Subfamily: Arctiinae
- Genus: Eumenogaster; Herrich-Schäffer, [1855]

Synonyms
- Sphecodes Herrich-Schäffer, [1858]

Genus of moths

Eumenogaster is a genus of moths in the subfamily Arctiinae erected by Gottlieb August Wilhelm Herrich-Schäffer in 1855.

== Species ==
- Eumenogaster affinis Rothschild, 1911
- Eumenogaster baura E. D. Jones, 1914
- Eumenogaster eumenes Herrich-Schäffer, 1856
- Eumenogaster haemacera Hampson, 1898
- Eumenogaster nigricauda Dognin, 1911
- Eumenogaster notabilis Walker, 1864
- Eumenogaster pseudosphecia Hampson, 1898
