= Eumenogaster haemacera =

Scientific classification
- Kingdom: Animalia
- Phylum: Arthropoda
- Class: Insecta
- Order: Lepidoptera
- Superfamily: Noctuoidea
- Family: Erebidae
- Subfamily: Arctiinae
- Genus: Eumenogaster
- Species: E. haemacera

Binomial name
- Eumenogaster haemacera Hampson, 1898

Species of moth

Eumenogaster haemacera is a moth of the subfamily Arctiinae. It was described by George Hampson in 1898. It is found in French Guiana.
