= Eumenogaster affinis =

Scientific classification
- Kingdom: Animalia
- Phylum: Arthropoda
- Class: Insecta
- Order: Lepidoptera
- Superfamily: Noctuoidea
- Family: Erebidae
- Subfamily: Arctiinae
- Genus: Eumenogaster
- Species: E. affinis

Binomial name
- Eumenogaster affinis Rothschild, 1911

Species of moth

Eumenogaster affinis is a moth of the subfamily Arctiinae. It was described by Rothschild in 1911. It is found in Venezuela.
