= Eumenogaster eumenes =

Scientific classification
- Domain: Eukaryota
- Kingdom: Animalia
- Phylum: Arthropoda
- Class: Insecta
- Order: Lepidoptera
- Superfamily: Noctuoidea
- Family: Erebidae
- Subfamily: Arctiinae
- Genus: Eumenogaster
- Species: E. eumenes

Binomial name
- Eumenogaster eumenes Herrich-Schäffer, 1856

Species of moth

Eumenogaster eumenes is a moth of the subfamily Arctiinae. It was described by Gottlieb August Wilhelm Herrich-Schäffer in 1856. It is found in Brazil.
