= Eumenogaster nigricauda =

Scientific classification
- Domain: Eukaryota
- Kingdom: Animalia
- Phylum: Arthropoda
- Class: Insecta
- Order: Lepidoptera
- Superfamily: Noctuoidea
- Family: Erebidae
- Subfamily: Arctiinae
- Genus: Eumenogaster
- Species: E. nigricauda

Binomial name
- Eumenogaster nigricauda Dognin, 1911

Species of moth

Eumenogaster nigricauda is a moth of the subfamily Arctiinae. It was described by Paul Dognin in 1911. It is found in French Guiana.
