= Eumenogaster notabilis =

Scientific classification
- Kingdom: Animalia
- Phylum: Arthropoda
- Class: Insecta
- Order: Lepidoptera
- Superfamily: Noctuoidea
- Family: Erebidae
- Subfamily: Arctiinae
- Genus: Eumenogaster
- Species: E. notabilis

Binomial name
- Eumenogaster notabilis (Walker, 1864)

Synonyms
- Pseudospex notabilis Walker, [1865]; Pseudoargyroeides notabilis ab. caurensis Klages, 1906

Species of moth

Eumenogaster notabilis is a moth of the subfamily Arctiinae. It was described by Francis Walker in 1864. It is found in the Amazon region.
