= Epectaptera discalis =

Scientific classification
- Domain: Eukaryota
- Kingdom: Animalia
- Phylum: Arthropoda
- Class: Insecta
- Order: Lepidoptera
- Superfamily: Noctuoidea
- Family: Erebidae
- Subfamily: Arctiinae
- Genus: Epectaptera
- Species: E. discalis

Binomial name
- Epectaptera discalis Schaus, 1905

Synonyms
- Epectaptera agualanii Strand, 1920

Species of moth

Epectaptera discalis is a moth of the subfamily Arctiinae. It was described by William Schaus in 1905. It is found in Peru.
