= Epectaptera umbrescens =

Scientific classification
- Domain: Eukaryota
- Kingdom: Animalia
- Phylum: Arthropoda
- Class: Insecta
- Order: Lepidoptera
- Superfamily: Noctuoidea
- Family: Erebidae
- Subfamily: Arctiinae
- Genus: Epectaptera
- Species: E. umbrescens

Binomial name
- Epectaptera umbrescens Schaus, 1905

Species of moth

Epectaptera umbrescens is a moth of the subfamily Arctiinae. It was described by Schaus in 1905. It is found in Peru.
