= Epectaptera innotata =

Scientific classification
- Domain: Eukaryota
- Kingdom: Animalia
- Phylum: Arthropoda
- Class: Insecta
- Order: Lepidoptera
- Superfamily: Noctuoidea
- Family: Erebidae
- Subfamily: Arctiinae
- Genus: Epectaptera
- Species: E. innotata

Binomial name
- Epectaptera innotata Dognin, 1899

Species of moth

Epectaptera innotata is a moth of the subfamily Arctiinae. It was described by Paul Dognin in 1899. It is found in Ecuador.
