= Epectaptera =

Scientific classification
- Kingdom: Animalia
- Phylum: Arthropoda
- Class: Insecta
- Order: Lepidoptera
- Superfamily: Noctuoidea
- Family: Erebidae
- Subfamily: Arctiinae
- Genus: Epectaptera; Hampson, 1898

Genus of moths

Epectaptera is a genus of moths in the subfamily Arctiinae. The genus was erected by George Hampson in 1898.

== Species ==
- Epectaptera discalis Schaus, 1905
- Epectaptera discosticta Hampson, 1898
- Epectaptera innotata Dognin, 1899
- Epectaptera laudabilis (Druce, 1896)
- Epectaptera metochria Dognin, 1912
- Epectaptera miniata (Rothschild, 1912)
- Epectaptera umbrescens Schaus, 1905
