= Epectaptera laudabilis =

Scientific classification
- Domain: Eukaryota
- Kingdom: Animalia
- Phylum: Arthropoda
- Class: Insecta
- Order: Lepidoptera
- Superfamily: Noctuoidea
- Family: Erebidae
- Subfamily: Arctiinae
- Genus: Epectaptera
- Species: E. laudabilis

Binomial name
- Epectaptera laudabilis (H. Druce, 1896)

Synonyms
- Aclytia laudabilis H. Druce, 1896

Species of moth

Epectaptera laudabilis is a moth of the subfamily Arctiinae. It was described by Herbert Druce in 1896. It is found in Bolivia.
