= Epectaptera metochria =

Scientific classification
- Domain: Eukaryota
- Kingdom: Animalia
- Phylum: Arthropoda
- Class: Insecta
- Order: Lepidoptera
- Superfamily: Noctuoidea
- Family: Erebidae
- Subfamily: Arctiinae
- Genus: Epectaptera
- Species: E. metochria

Binomial name
- Epectaptera metochria Dognin, 1912

Synonyms
- Epectaptera drucei Rothschild; Epectaptera metochria f. roseipennis Rothschild

Species of moth

Epectaptera metochria is a moth of the subfamily Arctiinae. It was described by Paul Dognin in 1912. It is found in Colombia.
