= Mimagyrta abdominalis =

Scientific classification
- Domain: Eukaryota
- Kingdom: Animalia
- Phylum: Arthropoda
- Class: Insecta
- Order: Lepidoptera
- Superfamily: Noctuoidea
- Family: Erebidae
- Subfamily: Arctiinae
- Genus: Mimagyrta
- Species: M. abdominalis

Binomial name
- Mimagyrta abdominalis (Rothschild, 1912)

Synonyms
- Agyrta abdominalis Rothschild, 1912

Species of moth

Mimagyrta abdominalis is a moth of the subfamily Arctiinae. It was described by Rothschild in 1912. It is found in French Guiana, Suriname and Venezuela.

The length of the forewings is 15–17 mm. The forewings are black with a broad glittering blue band two-fifths along the wing, a hyaline patch in the cell and a larger one below the median vein. There is a hyaline oblique postdiscal band reaching from the subcosta almost to the termen. The hindwings are black with a central hyaline band. The abdominal area is glittering blue.
