= Mimagyrta =

Scientific classification
- Domain: Eukaryota
- Kingdom: Animalia
- Phylum: Arthropoda
- Class: Insecta
- Order: Lepidoptera
- Superfamily: Noctuoidea
- Family: Erebidae
- Subfamily: Arctiinae
- Genus: Mimagyrta; Hampson, 1898

Genus of moths

Mimagyrta is a genus of moths in the subfamily Arctiinae. The genus was erected by George Hampson in 1898.

== Species ==
- Mimagyrta abdominalis Rothschild, 1912
- Mimagyrta chocoensis Kaye, 1919
- Mimagyrta pampa Druce, 1893
- Mimagyrta pulchella Klages, 1906
