= Mimagyrta pampa =

Scientific classification
- Domain: Eukaryota
- Kingdom: Animalia
- Phylum: Arthropoda
- Class: Insecta
- Order: Lepidoptera
- Superfamily: Noctuoidea
- Family: Erebidae
- Subfamily: Arctiinae
- Genus: Mimagyrta
- Species: M. pampa

Binomial name
- Mimagyrta pampa (H. Druce, 1893)

Synonyms
- Metastatia pampa H. Druce, 1893

Species of moth

Mimagyrta pampa is a moth of the subfamily Arctiinae. It was described by Herbert Druce in 1893. It is found in Ecuador.
