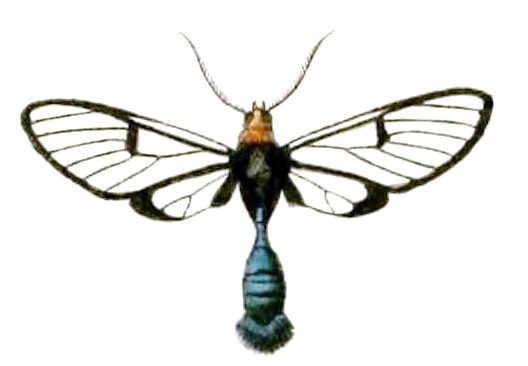
- Corematura aliaria

Scientific classification
- Kingdom: Animalia
- Phylum: Arthropoda
- Class: Insecta
- Order: Lepidoptera
- Superfamily: Noctuoidea
- Family: Erebidae
- Subfamily: Arctiinae
- Genus: Corematura; Butler, 1876

Synonyms
- Riccia Travassos, 1953

= Corematura =

Genus of moths

Corematura is a genus of moths in the subfamily Arctiinae. The genus was erected by Arthur Gardiner Butler in 1876.

== Species ==
- Corematura aliaria (Druce, 1890)
- Corematura chrysogastra Perty, 1834
