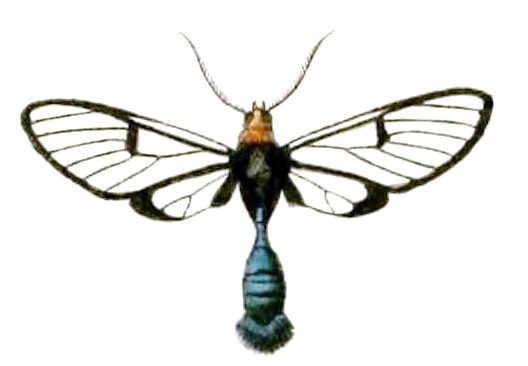

Scientific classification
- Kingdom: Animalia
- Phylum: Arthropoda
- Class: Insecta
- Order: Lepidoptera
- Superfamily: Noctuoidea
- Family: Erebidae
- Subfamily: Arctiinae
- Genus: Corematura
- Species: C. aliaria

Binomial name
- Corematura aliaria (H. Druce, 1890)

Synonyms
- Trichura aliaria H. Druce, 1890

= Corematura aliaria =

Species of moth

Corematura aliaria is a moth of the subfamily Arctiinae. It was described by Herbert Druce in 1890. It is found in Ecuador and Brazil.
