= Corematura chrysogastra =

Scientific classification
- Kingdom: Animalia
- Phylum: Arthropoda
- Class: Insecta
- Order: Lepidoptera
- Superfamily: Noctuoidea
- Family: Erebidae
- Subfamily: Arctiinae
- Genus: Corematura
- Species: C. chrysogastra

Binomial name
- Corematura chrysogastra (Perty, 1834)

Synonyms
- Glaucopis chrysogastra Perty, 1834; Glaucopis postflava Guérin-Méneville, [1844]; Eunomia abdominalis Walker, 1856

Species of moth

Corematura chrysogastra is a moth of the subfamily Arctiinae. It was described by Perty in 1834. It is found in Ecuador, Bolivia and the Amazon region.
