= Stictosia crocea =

Scientific classification
- Kingdom: Animalia
- Phylum: Arthropoda
- Clade: Pancrustacea
- Class: Insecta
- Order: Lepidoptera
- Superfamily: Noctuoidea
- Family: Erebidae
- Subfamily: Arctiinae
- Genus: Stictosia
- Species: S. crocea

Binomial name
- Stictosia crocea Holloway, 2001

Species of moth

Stictosia crocea is a moth in the family Erebidae first described by Jeremy Daniel Holloway in 2001. It is found on Borneo. The habitat consists of lowland swamp forests and dipterocarp forests on limestone.

The length of the forewings is 7–8 mm.
