= Stictosia flava =

Scientific classification
- Domain: Eukaryota
- Kingdom: Animalia
- Phylum: Arthropoda
- Class: Insecta
- Order: Lepidoptera
- Superfamily: Noctuoidea
- Family: Erebidae
- Subfamily: Arctiinae
- Genus: Stictosia
- Species: S. flava

Binomial name
- Stictosia flava (van Eecke, 1927)

Synonyms
- Siccia flava van Eecke, 1927

Species of moth

Stictosia flava is a moth in the family Erebidae first described by van Eecke in 1927. It is found on Sumatra and Borneo. The habitat consists of lower montane forests.
