= Stictosia =

Scientific classification
- Kingdom: Animalia
- Phylum: Arthropoda
- Class: Insecta
- Order: Lepidoptera
- Superfamily: Noctuoidea
- Family: Erebidae
- Subfamily: Arctiinae
- Tribe: Lithosiini
- Genus: Stictosia; Hampson, 1900

Genus of moths

Stictosia is a genus of moths in the family Erebidae which are common to the geographical region of Borneo.

== Species ==
- Stictosia flexilisana (Walker, 1863)
- Stictosia flava (van Eecke, 1927)
- Stictosia crocea Holloway, 2001
- Stictosia decubitana (Walker, 1863)
