= Stictosia decubitana =

Scientific classification
- Kingdom: Animalia
- Phylum: Arthropoda
- Class: Insecta
- Order: Lepidoptera
- Superfamily: Noctuoidea
- Family: Erebidae
- Subfamily: Arctiinae
- Genus: Stictosia
- Species: S. decubitana

Binomial name
- Stictosia decubitana (Walker, 1863)

Synonyms
- Tospitis decubitana Walker, 1863

Species of moth

Stictosia decubitana is a moth in the family Erebidae first described by Francis Walker in 1863. It is found on Borneo. The habitat consists of lowland areas.
