= Stictosia flexilisana =

Scientific classification
- Kingdom: Animalia
- Phylum: Arthropoda
- Class: Insecta
- Order: Lepidoptera
- Superfamily: Noctuoidea
- Family: Erebidae
- Subfamily: Arctiinae
- Genus: Stictosia
- Species: S. flexilisana

Binomial name
- Stictosia flexilisana (Walker, 1863)

Synonyms
- Conchylis flexilisana Walker, 1863; Tospitis illatalis Walker, 1864

Species of moth

Stictosia flexilisana is a moth in the family Erebidae first described by Francis Walker in 1863. It is found on Borneo. The habitat consists of lowland forests.
