= Mystrocneme =

Scientific classification
- Domain: Eukaryota
- Kingdom: Animalia
- Phylum: Arthropoda
- Class: Insecta
- Order: Lepidoptera
- Superfamily: Noctuoidea
- Family: Erebidae
- Subfamily: Arctiinae
- Genus: Mystrocneme; Herrich-Schäffer, [1855]

Genus of moths

Mystrocneme is a genus of moths in the subfamily Arctiinae. The genus was erected by Gottlieb August Wilhelm Herrich-Schäffer in 1855.

== Species ==
- Mystrocneme albicorpus Kaye, 1911
- Mystrocneme atavia Hampson, 1898
- Mystrocneme sectum Kaye, 1911
- Mystrocneme varipes Walker, 1854
