= Mystrocneme varipes =

Scientific classification
- Kingdom: Animalia
- Phylum: Arthropoda
- Clade: Pancrustacea
- Class: Insecta
- Order: Lepidoptera
- Superfamily: Noctuoidea
- Family: Erebidae
- Subfamily: Arctiinae
- Genus: Mystrocneme
- Species: M. varipes

Binomial name
- Mystrocneme varipes Walker, 1854

Synonyms
- Euchromia varipes Walker, 1854; Mystrocneme geminata Herrich-Schäffer, [1855]

Species of moth

Mystrocneme varipes is a moth of the subfamily Arctiinae. It was described by Francis Walker in 1854. It is found in Pará, Brazil.
