= Lithoprocris =

Scientific classification
- Domain: Eukaryota
- Kingdom: Animalia
- Phylum: Arthropoda
- Class: Insecta
- Order: Lepidoptera
- Superfamily: Noctuoidea
- Family: Erebidae
- Subfamily: Arctiinae
- Tribe: Lithosiini
- Genus: Lithoprocris; Dognin, 1899

Genus of moths

Lithoprocris is a genus of moths in the subfamily Arctiinae erected by Paul Dognin in 1899.

== Species ==
- Lithoprocris hamon Druce, 1902
- Lithoprocris jason Dognin, 1899
- Lithoprocris methyalea Hampson, 1900
- Lithoprocris postcaerulescens Rothschild, 1913
