= Lithoprocris jason =

Scientific classification
- Domain: Eukaryota
- Kingdom: Animalia
- Phylum: Arthropoda
- Class: Insecta
- Order: Lepidoptera
- Superfamily: Noctuoidea
- Family: Erebidae
- Subfamily: Arctiinae
- Genus: Lithoprocris
- Species: L. jason

Binomial name
- Lithoprocris jason Dognin, 1899

Species of moth

Lithoprocris jason is a moth of the subfamily Arctiinae. It was described by Paul Dognin in 1899. It is found in Ecuador.
