= Lithoprocris hamon =

Scientific classification
- Domain: Eukaryota
- Kingdom: Animalia
- Phylum: Arthropoda
- Class: Insecta
- Order: Lepidoptera
- Superfamily: Noctuoidea
- Family: Erebidae
- Subfamily: Arctiinae
- Genus: Lithoprocris
- Species: L. hamon

Binomial name
- Lithoprocris hamon (H. Druce, 1902)

Synonyms
- Saurita hamon H. Druce, 1902

Species of moth

Lithoprocris hamon is a moth of the subfamily Arctiinae. It was described by Herbert Druce in 1902. It is found in Peru.
