= Lithoprocris postcaerulescens =

Scientific classification
- Domain: Eukaryota
- Kingdom: Animalia
- Phylum: Arthropoda
- Class: Insecta
- Order: Lepidoptera
- Superfamily: Noctuoidea
- Family: Erebidae
- Subfamily: Arctiinae
- Genus: Lithoprocris
- Species: L. postcaerulescens

Binomial name
- Lithoprocris postcaerulescens Rothschild, 1913

Species of moth

Lithoprocris postcaerulescens is a moth of the subfamily Arctiinae. It was described by Rothschild in 1913.
