= Tospitis =

Scientific classification
- Kingdom: Animalia
- Phylum: Arthropoda
- Clade: Pancrustacea
- Class: Insecta
- Order: Lepidoptera
- Superfamily: Noctuoidea
- Family: Erebidae
- Subfamily: Arctiinae
- Tribe: Lithosiini
- Genus: Tospitis; Walker, 1863

Genus of moths

Tospitis is a genus of moths in the subfamily Arctiinae.

== Species ==
- Tospitis abstracta Bucsek, 2012
- Tospitis ambigua (Bucsek, 2014)
- Tospitis amoenusa (Bucsek, 2012)
- Tospitis apexinigra Bucsek, 2012
- Tospitis aurantimaculus Bucsek, 2012
- Tospitis brunneiplaga Hampson, 1918
- Tospitis denisae Bucsek, 2020
- Tospitis diversa Bucsek, 2012
- Tospitis floccula Bucsek, 2012
- Tospitis imonigra Bucsek, 2014
- Tospitis indica Bhende, 2026
- Tospitis lanosa Bucsek, 2014
- Tospitis metaleuca (Hampson, 1918)
- Tospitis nigripuncta Bucsek, 2014
- Tospitis nulliferana Walker, 1863
- Tospitis occasus Bucsek, 2012
- Tospitis ochrea Bucsek, 2014
- Tospitis ogriagra Bucsek, 2020
- Tospitis pastelflava Bucsek, 2014
- Tospitis pida (Černý, 2009)
- Tospitis straminis Bucsek, 2012
- Tospitis submontana Bucsek, 2014
- Tospitis variabilis Bucsek, 2012
