= Tospitis brunneiplaga =

Scientific classification
- Kingdom: Animalia
- Phylum: Arthropoda
- Class: Insecta
- Order: Lepidoptera
- Superfamily: Noctuoidea
- Family: Erebidae
- Subfamily: Arctiinae
- Genus: Tospitis
- Species: T. brunneiplaga

Binomial name
- Tospitis brunneiplaga Hampson, 1918

Species of moth

Tospitis brunneiplaga is a moth in the subfamily Arctiinae. It was described by George Hampson in 1918. It is found in Bhutan.
