= Tospitis nulliferana =

Scientific classification
- Kingdom: Animalia
- Phylum: Arthropoda
- Class: Insecta
- Order: Lepidoptera
- Superfamily: Noctuoidea
- Family: Erebidae
- Subfamily: Arctiinae
- Genus: Tospitis
- Species: T. nulliferana

Binomial name
- Tospitis nulliferana Walker, 1863

Species of moth

Tospitis nulliferana is a moth in the subfamily Arctiinae. It was described by Francis Walker in 1863. It is found on Borneo. The habitat consists of coastal swamp forests and alluvial forests.
