= Tenuinaclia oberthueri =

Scientific classification
- Domain: Eukaryota
- Kingdom: Animalia
- Phylum: Arthropoda
- Class: Insecta
- Order: Lepidoptera
- Superfamily: Noctuoidea
- Family: Erebidae
- Subfamily: Arctiinae
- Genus: Tenuinaclia
- Species: T. oberthueri

Binomial name
- Tenuinaclia oberthueri (Rothschild, 1911)

Synonyms
- Micronaclia oberthueri Rothschild, 1911

Species of moth

Tenuinaclia oberthueri is a moth in the subfamily Arctiinae. It was described by Rothschild in 1911. It is found in Madagascar.
