= Tenuinaclia melancholica =

Scientific classification
- Domain: Eukaryota
- Kingdom: Animalia
- Phylum: Arthropoda
- Class: Insecta
- Order: Lepidoptera
- Superfamily: Noctuoidea
- Family: Erebidae
- Subfamily: Arctiinae
- Genus: Tenuinaclia
- Species: T. melancholica

Binomial name
- Tenuinaclia melancholica (Le Cerf, 1921)

Synonyms
- Thyrosticta melancholica Le Cerf, 1921

Species of moth

Tenuinaclia melancholica is a moth in the subfamily Arctiinae. It was described by Ferdinand Le Cerf in 1921. It is found on Madagascar.
