= Tenuinaclia =

Scientific classification
- Domain: Eukaryota
- Kingdom: Animalia
- Phylum: Arthropoda
- Class: Insecta
- Order: Lepidoptera
- Superfamily: Noctuoidea
- Family: Erebidae
- Subfamily: Arctiinae
- Genus: Tenuinaclia; Griveaud, 1964

Genus of moths

Tenuinaclia is a genus of moth in the subfamily Arctiinae from Madagascar.

== Species ==
- Tenuinaclia andapa Griveaud, 1964
- Tenuinaclia melancholica (Le Cerf, 1921)
- Tenuinaclia oberthueri (Rothschild, 1911)
