= Micragrella ochrea =

Scientific classification
- Kingdom: Animalia
- Phylum: Arthropoda
- Class: Insecta
- Order: Lepidoptera
- Superfamily: Noctuoidea
- Family: Erebidae
- Subfamily: Arctiinae
- Genus: Micragrella
- Species: M. ochrea

Binomial name
- Micragrella ochrea Hampson, 1901

Species of moth

Micragrella ochrea is a moth of the subfamily Arctiinae. It was described by George Hampson in 1901. It is found in Brazil.
