= Micragrella aetolia =

Scientific classification
- Domain: Eukaryota
- Kingdom: Animalia
- Phylum: Arthropoda
- Class: Insecta
- Order: Lepidoptera
- Superfamily: Noctuoidea
- Family: Erebidae
- Subfamily: Arctiinae
- Genus: Micragrella
- Species: M. aetolia

Binomial name
- Micragrella aetolia (H. Druce, 1900)

Synonyms
- Eucereon aetolia H. Druce, 1900

Species of moth

Micragrella aetolia is a moth of the subfamily Arctiinae. It was described by Herbert Druce in 1900. It is found in Colombia.
