= Micragrella =

Scientific classification
- Domain: Eukaryota
- Kingdom: Animalia
- Phylum: Arthropoda
- Class: Insecta
- Order: Lepidoptera
- Superfamily: Noctuoidea
- Family: Erebidae
- Subfamily: Arctiinae
- Genus: Micragrella; Watson, 1980

Synonyms
- Micragra Hampson, 1898 (preocc. Chandoir, 1872)

Genus of moths

Micragrella is a genus of moths in the subfamily Arctiinae. The genus was erected by Watson in 1980.

== Species ==
- Micragrella aetolia H. Druce, 1900
- Micragrella ochrea Hampson, 1901
- Micragrella sanguiceps Hampson, 1898
