= Micragrella sanguiceps =

Scientific classification
- Kingdom: Animalia
- Phylum: Arthropoda
- Class: Insecta
- Order: Lepidoptera
- Superfamily: Noctuoidea
- Family: Erebidae
- Subfamily: Arctiinae
- Genus: Micragrella
- Species: M. sanguiceps

Binomial name
- Micragrella sanguiceps (Hampson, 1898)

Synonyms
- Micragra sanguiceps Hampson, 1898

Species of moth

Micragrella sanguiceps is a moth of the subfamily Arctiinae. It was described by George Hampson in 1898. It is found in Brazil.
