= Diarhabdosia brunnea =

Scientific classification
- Domain: Eukaryota
- Kingdom: Animalia
- Phylum: Arthropoda
- Class: Insecta
- Order: Lepidoptera
- Superfamily: Noctuoidea
- Family: Erebidae
- Subfamily: Arctiinae
- Genus: Diarhabdosia
- Species: D. brunnea

Binomial name
- Diarhabdosia brunnea Reich, 1933

Species of moth

Diarhabdosia brunnea is a moth of the subfamily Arctiinae. It is found in Brazil.
