= Diarhabdosia strigipennis =

Scientific classification
- Domain: Eukaryota
- Kingdom: Animalia
- Phylum: Arthropoda
- Class: Insecta
- Order: Lepidoptera
- Superfamily: Noctuoidea
- Family: Erebidae
- Subfamily: Arctiinae
- Genus: Diarhabdosia
- Species: D. strigipennis

Binomial name
- Diarhabdosia strigipennis Schaus, 1905

Species of moth

Diarhabdosia strigipennis is a moth of the subfamily Arctiinae. It is found in French Guiana.
