= Diarhabdosia minima =

Scientific classification
- Domain: Eukaryota
- Kingdom: Animalia
- Phylum: Arthropoda
- Class: Insecta
- Order: Lepidoptera
- Superfamily: Noctuoidea
- Family: Erebidae
- Subfamily: Arctiinae
- Genus: Diarhabdosia
- Species: D. minima

Binomial name
- Diarhabdosia minima (Butler, 1878)

Synonyms
- Eustixia minima Butler, 1878; Diarhabdosia minima ab. rosea Draudt, 1919

Species of moth

Diarhabdosia minima is a moth of the subfamily Arctiinae first described by Arthur Gardiner Butler in 1878. It is found from Mexico to the Amazon region.
