= Diarhabdosia =

Scientific classification
- Kingdom: Animalia
- Phylum: Arthropoda
- Class: Insecta
- Order: Lepidoptera
- Superfamily: Noctuoidea
- Family: Erebidae
- Subfamily: Arctiinae
- Tribe: Lithosiini
- Genus: Diarhabdosia; Hampson, 1900

Genus of moths

Diarhabdosia is a genus of moths in the subfamily Arctiinae. The genus was erected by George Hampson in 1900.

== Species ==
- Diarhabdosia brunnea
- Diarhabdosia minima
- Diarhabdosia strigipennis
