= Agkonia =

Scientific classification
- Domain: Eukaryota
- Kingdom: Animalia
- Phylum: Arthropoda
- Class: Insecta
- Order: Lepidoptera
- Superfamily: Noctuoidea
- Family: Erebidae
- Subfamily: Arctiinae
- Tribe: Lithosiini
- Genus: Agkonia; Dognin, 1894

Genus of moths

Agkonia is a genus of moths in the subfamily Arctiinae. The genus was erected by Paul Dognin in 1894.

== Species ==
- Agkonia miranda Hampson, 1900
- Agkonia ovifera Dognin, 1906
- Agkonia pega Dognin, 1894
