= Agkonia ovifera =

Scientific classification
- Domain: Eukaryota
- Kingdom: Animalia
- Phylum: Arthropoda
- Class: Insecta
- Order: Lepidoptera
- Superfamily: Noctuoidea
- Family: Erebidae
- Subfamily: Arctiinae
- Genus: Agkonia
- Species: A. ovifera

Binomial name
- Agkonia ovifera Dognin, 1906

Species of moth

Agkonia ovifera is a moth of the subfamily Arctiinae that occurs in Peru. It was first described by Paul Dognin in 1906.
