= Microgiton submacula =

Scientific classification
- Kingdom: Animalia
- Phylum: Arthropoda
- Class: Insecta
- Order: Lepidoptera
- Superfamily: Noctuoidea
- Family: Erebidae
- Subfamily: Arctiinae
- Genus: Microgiton
- Species: M. submacula

Binomial name
- Microgiton submacula (Walker, 1854)

Synonyms
- Virbia submacula Walker, 1854; Microgiton selene Felder, 1874

Species of moth

Microgiton submacula is a moth of the subfamily Arctiinae. It was described by Francis Walker in 1854. It is found in Venezuela.
