= Microgiton eos =

Scientific classification
- Kingdom: Animalia
- Phylum: Arthropoda
- Class: Insecta
- Order: Lepidoptera
- Superfamily: Noctuoidea
- Family: Erebidae
- Subfamily: Arctiinae
- Genus: Microgiton
- Species: M. eos

Binomial name
- Microgiton eos (H. Druce, 1899)

Synonyms
- Devara eos H. Druce, 1899; Nebulosa eos

Species of moth

Microgiton eos is a moth of the subfamily Arctiinae. It was described by Herbert Druce in 1899. It is found in Ecuador.

The forewings are black with a streak at the base and four yellowish-white spots at the end of the cell. The hindwings are white, very broadly bordered with black.
