= Microgiton =

Scientific classification
- Kingdom: Animalia
- Phylum: Arthropoda
- Class: Insecta
- Order: Lepidoptera
- Superfamily: Noctuoidea
- Family: Erebidae
- Subfamily: Arctiinae
- Genus: Microgiton; Felder, 1874

Synonyms
- Macronyx Felder, 1874 (preocc. Swainson, 1827)

Genus of moths

Microgiton is a genus of moths in the subfamily Arctiinae. The genus was described by Felder in 1874.

== Species ==
- Microgiton eos H. Druce
- Microgiton submacula Walker, 1854
