= Dixophlebia quadristrigata =

Scientific classification
- Kingdom: Animalia
- Phylum: Arthropoda
- Class: Insecta
- Order: Lepidoptera
- Superfamily: Noctuoidea
- Family: Erebidae
- Subfamily: Arctiinae
- Genus: Dixophlebia
- Species: D. quadristrigata

Binomial name
- Dixophlebia quadristrigata (Walker, 1864)

Synonyms
- Pseudomya quadristrigata Walker, [1865]

Species of moth

Dixophlebia quadristrigata is a moth of the subfamily Arctiinae. It was described by Francis Walker in 1864. It is found in Brazil (Tefé, Minas Gerais).
