= Dixophlebia holophaea =

Scientific classification
- Kingdom: Animalia
- Phylum: Arthropoda
- Class: Insecta
- Order: Lepidoptera
- Superfamily: Noctuoidea
- Family: Erebidae
- Subfamily: Arctiinae
- Genus: Dixophlebia
- Species: D. holophaea

Binomial name
- Dixophlebia holophaea Hampson, 1909

Species of moth

Dixophlebia holophaea is a moth of the subfamily Arctiinae. It was described by George Hampson in 1909. It is found in Guyana.
