= Chlorogenia pallidimaculata =

Scientific classification
- Domain: Eukaryota
- Kingdom: Animalia
- Phylum: Arthropoda
- Class: Insecta
- Order: Lepidoptera
- Superfamily: Noctuoidea
- Family: Erebidae
- Subfamily: Arctiinae
- Genus: Chlorogenia
- Species: C. pallidimaculata

Binomial name
- Chlorogenia pallidimaculata (Rothschild, 1912)

Synonyms
- Stictosia pallidimaculata Rothschild, 1912

Species of moth

Chlorogenia pallidimaculata is a moth of the subfamily Arctiinae. It is found in New Guinea.
