= Chlorogenia cholerota =

Scientific classification
- Kingdom: Animalia
- Phylum: Arthropoda
- Class: Insecta
- Order: Lepidoptera
- Superfamily: Noctuoidea
- Family: Erebidae
- Subfamily: Arctiinae
- Genus: Chlorogenia
- Species: C. cholerota

Binomial name
- Chlorogenia cholerota Meyrick, 1889

Species of moth

Chlorogenia cholerota is a moth of the subfamily Arctiinae first described by Edward Meyrick in 1889. It is found in New Guinea.
