= Chlorogenia =

Scientific classification
- Kingdom: Animalia
- Phylum: Arthropoda
- Class: Insecta
- Order: Lepidoptera
- Superfamily: Noctuoidea
- Family: Erebidae
- Subfamily: Arctiinae
- Tribe: Lithosiini
- Genus: Chlorogenia; Meyrick, 1889

Genus of moths

Chlorogenia is a genus of moths in the subfamily Arctiinae. The genus was erected by Edward Meyrick in 1889.

== Species ==
- Chlorogenia cholerota
- Chlorogenia pallidimaculata
