= Metaloba nana =

Scientific classification
- Domain: Eukaryota
- Kingdom: Animalia
- Phylum: Arthropoda
- Class: Insecta
- Order: Lepidoptera
- Superfamily: Noctuoidea
- Family: Erebidae
- Subfamily: Arctiinae
- Genus: Metaloba
- Species: M. nana

Binomial name
- Metaloba nana (H. Druce, 1897)

Synonyms
- Calanotos nana H. Druce, 1897

Species of moth

Metaloba nana is a moth of the subfamily Arctiinae. It was described by Herbert Druce in 1897. It is found in Colombia.
