= Pezaptera =

Scientific classification
- Domain: Eukaryota
- Kingdom: Animalia
- Phylum: Arthropoda
- Class: Insecta
- Order: Lepidoptera
- Superfamily: Noctuoidea
- Family: Erebidae
- Subfamily: Arctiinae
- Genus: Pezaptera; Butler, 1876

Genus of moths

Pezaptera is a genus of moths in the subfamily Arctiinae.

== Species ==
- Pezaptera chapmani Klages, 1906
- Pezaptera sordida Walker, 1856
