= Pezaptera sordida =

Scientific classification
- Kingdom: Animalia
- Phylum: Arthropoda
- Class: Insecta
- Order: Lepidoptera
- Superfamily: Noctuoidea
- Family: Erebidae
- Subfamily: Arctiinae
- Genus: Pezaptera
- Species: P. sordida

Binomial name
- Pezaptera sordida (Walker, 1856)

Synonyms
- Eunomia sordida Walker, 1856; Pheia divisa Walker, [1865]

Species of moth

Pezaptera sordida is a moth of the subfamily Arctiinae. It was described by Francis Walker in 1856. It is found in Tefé, Brazil.
