= Marecidia sanguipuncta =

Scientific classification
- Domain: Eukaryota
- Kingdom: Animalia
- Phylum: Arthropoda
- Class: Insecta
- Order: Lepidoptera
- Superfamily: Noctuoidea
- Family: Erebidae
- Subfamily: Arctiinae
- Genus: Marecidia
- Species: M. sanguipuncta

Binomial name
- Marecidia sanguipuncta Schaus, 1901

Species of moth

Marecidia sanguipuncta is a moth of the subfamily Arctiinae. It was described by William Schaus in 1901. It is found in Brazil (Santa Catarina).
