= Marecidia achrysa =

Scientific classification
- Kingdom: Animalia
- Phylum: Arthropoda
- Clade: Pancrustacea
- Class: Insecta
- Order: Lepidoptera
- Superfamily: Noctuoidea
- Family: Erebidae
- Subfamily: Arctiinae
- Genus: Marecidia
- Species: M. achrysa

Binomial name
- Marecidia achrysa Forbes, 1939

Species of moth

Marecidia achrysa is a moth of the subfamily Arctiinae. It was described by William Trowbridge Merrifield Forbes in 1939. It is found in Panama.
