= Marecidia =

Scientific classification
- Domain: Eukaryota
- Kingdom: Animalia
- Phylum: Arthropoda
- Class: Insecta
- Order: Lepidoptera
- Superfamily: Noctuoidea
- Family: Erebidae
- Subfamily: Arctiinae
- Genus: Marecidia; Schaus, 1901

Genus of moths

Marecidia is a genus of moths in the subfamily Arctiinae.

== Species ==
- Marecidia achrysa Forbes, 1939
- Marecidia sanguipuncta Schaus, 1901
