= Metallosia nitens =

Scientific classification
- Domain: Eukaryota
- Kingdom: Animalia
- Phylum: Arthropoda
- Class: Insecta
- Order: Lepidoptera
- Superfamily: Noctuoidea
- Family: Erebidae
- Subfamily: Arctiinae
- Genus: Metallosia
- Species: M. nitens

Binomial name
- Metallosia nitens Schaus, 1911

Species of moth

Metallosia nitens is a moth of the subfamily Arctiinae. It was described by William Schaus in 1911. It is found in Costa Rica and Panama.
