= Metallosia chrysotis =

Scientific classification
- Kingdom: Animalia
- Phylum: Arthropoda
- Class: Insecta
- Order: Lepidoptera
- Superfamily: Noctuoidea
- Family: Erebidae
- Subfamily: Arctiinae
- Genus: Metallosia
- Species: M. chrysotis

Binomial name
- Metallosia chrysotis Hampson, 1900

Species of moth

Metallosia chrysotis is a moth of the subfamily Arctiinae. It was described by George Hampson in 1900. It is found in the Brazilian states of Espírito Santo and Rio de Janeiro.
