= Eurynora =

Scientific classification
- Kingdom: Animalia
- Phylum: Arthropoda
- Class: Insecta
- Order: Lepidoptera
- Superfamily: Noctuoidea
- Family: Erebidae
- Subfamily: Arctiinae
- Tribe: Lithosiini
- Genus: Eurynora; Hampson, 1914

Genus of moths

Eurynora is a genus of moths in the subfamily Arctiinae.

== Species ==
- Eurynora antepallida Strand, 1922
- Eurynora flavoeola Rothschild, 1912
