= Eurynora antepallida =

Scientific classification
- Domain: Eukaryota
- Kingdom: Animalia
- Phylum: Arthropoda
- Class: Insecta
- Order: Lepidoptera
- Superfamily: Noctuoidea
- Family: Erebidae
- Subfamily: Arctiinae
- Genus: Eurynora
- Species: E. antepallida

Binomial name
- Eurynora antepallida Strand, 1922

Species of moth

Eurynora antepallida is a moth of the subfamily Arctiinae. It was described by Strand in 1922.
