= Eurynora flavoeola =

Scientific classification
- Domain: Eukaryota
- Kingdom: Animalia
- Phylum: Arthropoda
- Class: Insecta
- Order: Lepidoptera
- Superfamily: Noctuoidea
- Family: Erebidae
- Subfamily: Arctiinae
- Genus: Eurynora
- Species: E. flavoeola

Binomial name
- Eurynora flavoeola (Rothschild, 1912)

Synonyms
- Bitecta flavoeola Rothschild, 1912

Species of moth

Eurynora flavoeola is a moth of the subfamily Arctiinae. It was described by Rothschild in 1912. It is found in New Guinea.
