= Procrimima =

Scientific classification
- Kingdom: Animalia
- Phylum: Arthropoda
- Class: Insecta
- Order: Lepidoptera
- Superfamily: Noctuoidea
- Family: Erebidae
- Subfamily: Arctiinae
- Tribe: Lithosiini
- Genus: Procrimima; Hampson, 1900

Genus of moths

Procrimima is a genus of moths in the subfamily Arctiinae.

== Species ==
- Procrimima procris Felder, 1875
- Procrimima viridis Druce, 1906
