= Procrimima procris =

Scientific classification
- Domain: Eukaryota
- Kingdom: Animalia
- Phylum: Arthropoda
- Class: Insecta
- Order: Lepidoptera
- Superfamily: Noctuoidea
- Family: Erebidae
- Subfamily: Arctiinae
- Genus: Procrimima
- Species: P. procris

Binomial name
- Procrimima procris (Felder, 1875)

Synonyms
- Lithosia procris Felder, 1875

Species of moth

Procrimima procris is a moth in the subfamily Arctiinae. It was described by Felder in 1875. It is found in Colombia and Peru.
