= Procrimima viridis =

Scientific classification
- Domain: Eukaryota
- Kingdom: Animalia
- Phylum: Arthropoda
- Class: Insecta
- Order: Lepidoptera
- Superfamily: Noctuoidea
- Family: Erebidae
- Subfamily: Arctiinae
- Genus: Procrimima
- Species: P. viridis

Binomial name
- Procrimima viridis Druce, 1906

Species of moth

Procrimima viridis is a moth in the subfamily Arctiinae. It was described by Druce in 1906. It is found in Peru and Brazil.
