= Serincia metallica =

Scientific classification
- Kingdom: Animalia
- Phylum: Arthropoda
- Class: Insecta
- Order: Lepidoptera
- Superfamily: Noctuoidea
- Family: Erebidae
- Subfamily: Arctiinae
- Genus: Serincia
- Species: S. metallica

Binomial name
- Serincia metallica Dyar, 1914

Species of moth

Serincia metallica is a moth in the subfamily Arctiinae. It was described by Harrison Gray Dyar Jr. in 1914. It is found in Panama.
