= Serincia lineata =

Scientific classification
- Domain: Eukaryota
- Kingdom: Animalia
- Phylum: Arthropoda
- Class: Insecta
- Order: Lepidoptera
- Superfamily: Noctuoidea
- Family: Erebidae
- Subfamily: Arctiinae
- Genus: Serincia
- Species: S. lineata

Binomial name
- Serincia lineata Reich, 1933

Species of moth

Serincia lineata is a moth in the subfamily Arctiinae. It was described by Reich in 1933. It is found in Brazil.
