= Serincia =

Scientific classification
- Kingdom: Animalia
- Phylum: Arthropoda
- Class: Insecta
- Order: Lepidoptera
- Superfamily: Noctuoidea
- Family: Erebidae
- Subfamily: Arctiinae
- Tribe: Lithosiini
- Genus: Serincia; Dyar, 1914

Genus of moths

Serincia is a genus of moths in the subfamily Arctiinae. The genus was erected by Harrison Gray Dyar Jr. in 1914.

== Species ==
- Serincia lineata Reich, 1933
- Serincia metallica Dyar, 1914
