= Diaconisia =

Scientific classification
- Kingdom: Animalia
- Phylum: Arthropoda
- Class: Insecta
- Order: Lepidoptera
- Superfamily: Noctuoidea
- Family: Erebidae
- Subfamily: Arctiinae
- Tribe: Lithosiini
- Genus: Diaconisia; Hampson, 1914
- Species: D. ochraceorufa

Binomial name
- Diaconisia ochraceorufa (Rothschild, 1913)

Synonyms
- Melanaema ochraceorufa Rothschild, 1913

Genus of moths

Diaconisia is a monotypic moth genus in the family Erebidae erected by George Hampson in 1914. Its only species, Diaconisia ochraceorufa, was first described by Walter Rothschild in 1913. It is found in Western New Guinea.
