= Licnoptera =

Scientific classification
- Kingdom: Animalia
- Phylum: Arthropoda
- Class: Insecta
- Order: Lepidoptera
- Superfamily: Noctuoidea
- Family: Erebidae
- Subfamily: Arctiinae
- Genus: Licnoptera; Meyrick, 1889
- Species: L. crocodora

Binomial name
- Licnoptera crocodora Meyrick, 1889

Synonyms
- Generic: Monotropia Kirby, 1892; Specific: Chrysallactis apiciplaga Rothschild, 1913; Licnoptera crocodera Kirby, 1893

Genus of moths

Licnoptera is a monotypic moth genus in the family Erebidae. Its only species, Licnoptera crocodora, is found in New Guinea. Both the genus and species were described by Edward Meyrick in 1889.
