= Amata phoenicia =

Scientific classification
- Kingdom: Animalia
- Phylum: Arthropoda
- Class: Insecta
- Order: Lepidoptera
- Superfamily: Noctuoidea
- Family: Erebidae
- Subfamily: Arctiinae
- Genus: Amata
- Species: A. phoenicia

Binomial name
- Amata phoenicia (Hampson, 1898)

Synonyms
- Syntomis phoenicia Hampson, 1898

Species of moth

Amata phoenicia is a moth of the family Erebidae. It was described by George Hampson in 1898. It is found in Kenya and Tanzania.
