= Amata xanthura =

Scientific classification
- Domain: Eukaryota
- Kingdom: Animalia
- Phylum: Arthropoda
- Class: Insecta
- Order: Lepidoptera
- Superfamily: Noctuoidea
- Family: Erebidae
- Subfamily: Arctiinae
- Genus: Amata
- Species: A. xanthura

Binomial name
- Amata xanthura (Turner, 1905)

Synonyms
- Syntomis xanthura Turner, 1905

Species of moth

Amata xanthura, the southern spotted tiger moth, is a species of moth of the family Erebidae. It was first described by Alfred Jefferis Turner in 1905. It is found in Australia, where it has been recorded from the Northern Territory, New South Wales and Victoria.
