= Amata janenschi =

Scientific classification
- Kingdom: Animalia
- Phylum: Arthropoda
- Class: Insecta
- Order: Lepidoptera
- Superfamily: Noctuoidea
- Family: Erebidae
- Subfamily: Arctiinae
- Genus: Amata
- Species: A. janenschi

Binomial name
- Amata janenschi Seitz, 1926

Species of moth

Amata janenschi is a moth of the family Erebidae. It was described by Seitz in 1926. It is found in Tanzania.
