= Amata albapex =

Scientific classification
- Kingdom: Animalia
- Phylum: Arthropoda
- Class: Insecta
- Order: Lepidoptera
- Superfamily: Noctuoidea
- Family: Erebidae
- Subfamily: Arctiinae
- Genus: Amata
- Species: A. albapex

Binomial name
- Amata albapex Hampson, 1893

Species of moth

Amata albapex is a moth of the family Erebidae.
