= Amata williami =

Scientific classification
- Domain: Eukaryota
- Kingdom: Animalia
- Phylum: Arthropoda
- Class: Insecta
- Order: Lepidoptera
- Superfamily: Noctuoidea
- Family: Erebidae
- Subfamily: Arctiinae
- Genus: Amata
- Species: A. williami

Binomial name
- Amata williami Rothschild, 1910

Synonyms
- Amata villiami Hampson, 1914

Species of moth

Amata williami is a moth of the family Erebidae. It was described by Rothschild in 1910. It is found in Kenya.
