= Amata ochrospila =

Scientific classification
- Domain: Eukaryota
- Kingdom: Animalia
- Phylum: Arthropoda
- Class: Insecta
- Order: Lepidoptera
- Superfamily: Noctuoidea
- Family: Erebidae
- Subfamily: Arctiinae
- Genus: Amata
- Species: A. ochrospila

Binomial name
- Amata ochrospila (Turner, 1922)

Synonyms
- Syntomis ochrospila Turner, 1922

Species of moth

Amata ochrospila is a species of moth of the family Erebidae first described by Alfred Jefferis Turner in 1922. It is found in Australia.
