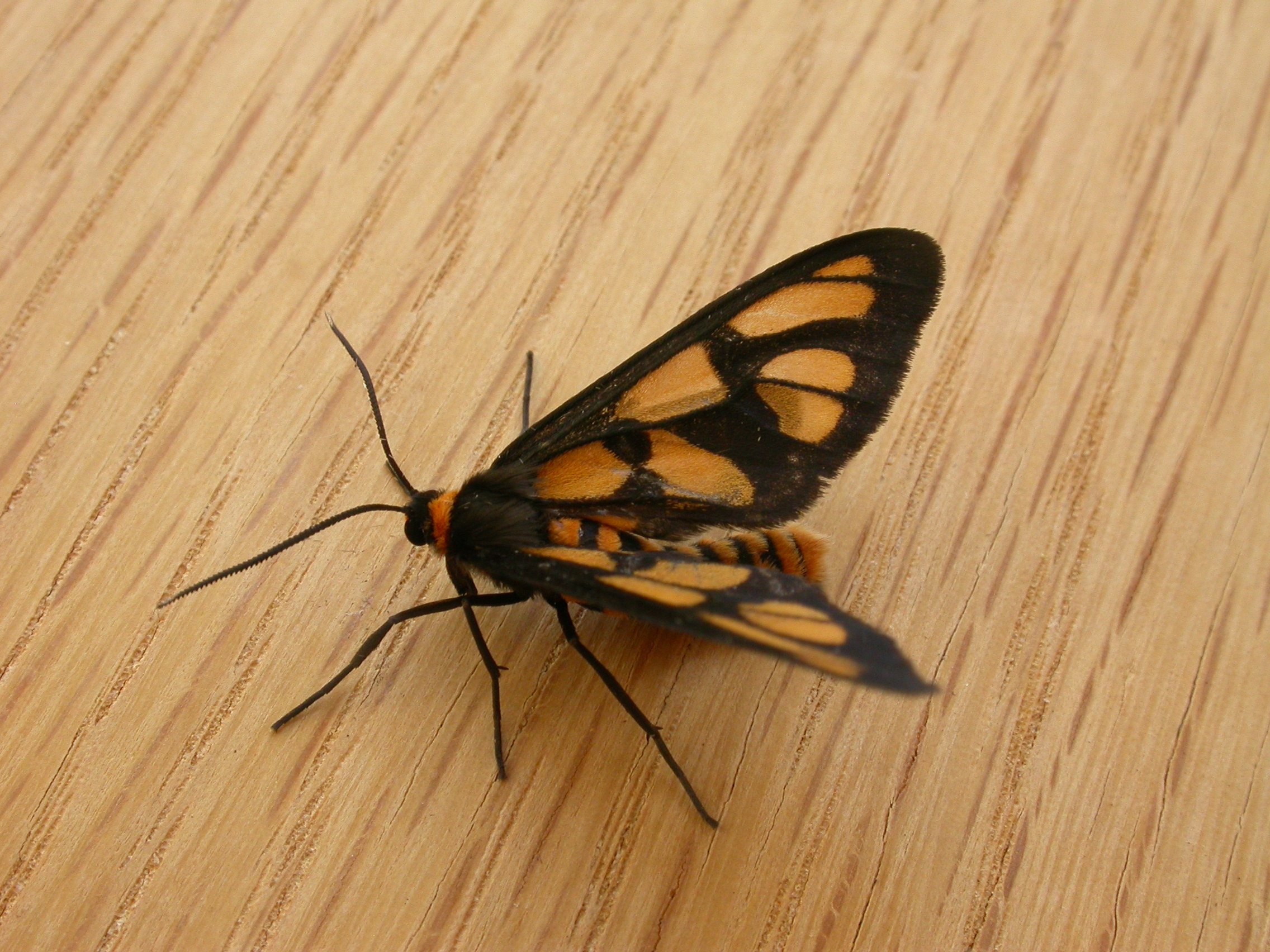

Scientific classification
- Kingdom: Animalia
- Phylum: Arthropoda
- Clade: Pancrustacea
- Class: Insecta
- Order: Lepidoptera
- Superfamily: Noctuoidea
- Family: Erebidae
- Subfamily: Arctiinae
- Genus: Amata
- Species: A. trigonophora

Binomial name
- Amata trigonophora (Turner, 1898)

Synonyms
- Hydrusa trigonophora Turner, 1898

= Amata trigonophora =

Species of moth

Amata trigonophora is a moth of the subfamily Arctiinae first described by Alfred Jefferis Turner in 1898. It is found in the coastal areas of eastern Australia.
