= Amata ntebi =

Scientific classification
- Domain: Eukaryota
- Kingdom: Animalia
- Phylum: Arthropoda
- Class: Insecta
- Order: Lepidoptera
- Superfamily: Noctuoidea
- Family: Erebidae
- Subfamily: Arctiinae
- Genus: Amata
- Species: A. ntebi

Binomial name
- Amata ntebi (Bethune-Baker, 1911)

Synonyms
- Syntomis ntebi Bethune-Baker, 1911; Amata entebi Hampson, 1914

Species of moth

Amata ntebi is a moth of the family Erebidae. It was described by George Thomas Bethune-Baker in 1911. It is found in Uganda.
