= Amata cyanura =

Scientific classification
- Kingdom: Animalia
- Phylum: Arthropoda
- Class: Insecta
- Order: Lepidoptera
- Superfamily: Noctuoidea
- Family: Erebidae
- Subfamily: Arctiinae
- Genus: Amata
- Species: A. cyanura

Binomial name
- Amata cyanura (Meyrick, 1886)

Synonyms
- Hydrusa cyanura Meyrick, 1886

Species of moth

Amata cyanura is a species of moth of the family Erebidae first described by Edward Meyrick in 1886. It is found on the Torres Strait Islands between Australia and New Guinea.
