= Amata tripunctata =

Scientific classification
- Kingdom: Animalia
- Phylum: Arthropoda
- Clade: Pancrustacea
- Class: Insecta
- Order: Lepidoptera
- Superfamily: Noctuoidea
- Family: Erebidae
- Subfamily: Arctiinae
- Genus: Amata
- Species: A. tripunctata

Binomial name
- Amata tripunctata (Bethune-Baker, 1911)

Synonyms
- Syntomis tripunctata Bethune-Baker, 1911

Species of moth

Amata tripunctata is a moth of the subfamily Arctiinae. It was described by George Thomas Bethune-Baker in 1911 and lives in Angola.
