= Amata macroplaca =

Scientific classification
- Kingdom: Animalia
- Phylum: Arthropoda
- Class: Insecta
- Order: Lepidoptera
- Superfamily: Noctuoidea
- Family: Erebidae
- Subfamily: Arctiinae
- Genus: Amata
- Species: A. macroplaca

Binomial name
- Amata macroplaca (Meyrick, 1886)

Synonyms
- Hydrusa macroplaca Meyrick, 1886

Species of moth

Amata macroplaca is a species of moth of the subfamily Arctiinae first described by Edward Meyrick in 1886. It is found in New South Wales, Australia.
