= Amata bifasciata =

Scientific classification
- Domain: Eukaryota
- Kingdom: Animalia
- Phylum: Arthropoda
- Class: Insecta
- Order: Lepidoptera
- Superfamily: Noctuoidea
- Family: Erebidae
- Subfamily: Arctiinae
- Genus: Amata
- Species: A. bifasciata

Binomial name
- Amata bifasciata (Hopffer, 1857)

Synonyms
- Syntomis bifasciata Hopffer, 1857

Species of moth

Amata bifasciata is a moth of the subfamily Arctiinae. It was described by Carl Heinrich Hopffer in 1857. It is found in Mozambique.
