= Amata polyxo =

Scientific classification
- Domain: Eukaryota
- Kingdom: Animalia
- Phylum: Arthropoda
- Class: Insecta
- Order: Lepidoptera
- Superfamily: Noctuoidea
- Family: Erebidae
- Subfamily: Arctiinae
- Genus: Amata
- Species: A. polyxo

Binomial name
- Amata polyxo (Fawcett, 1918)

Synonyms
- Syntomis polyxo Fawcett, 1918

Species of moth

Amata polyxo is a moth of the family Erebidae. It was described by James Farish Malcolm Fawcett in 1918. It is found in Kenya.
