= Amata dilateralis =

Scientific classification
- Kingdom: Animalia
- Phylum: Arthropoda
- Class: Insecta
- Order: Lepidoptera
- Superfamily: Noctuoidea
- Family: Erebidae
- Subfamily: Arctiinae
- Genus: Amata
- Species: A. dilateralis

Binomial name
- Amata dilateralis (Hampson, 1898)

Synonyms
- Syntomis dilateralis Hampson, 1898

Species of moth

Amata dilateralis is a moth of the family Erebidae. It was described by George Hampson in 1898. It is found in Tanzania.
