= Amata simplex =

Scientific classification
- Kingdom: Animalia
- Phylum: Arthropoda
- Class: Insecta
- Order: Lepidoptera
- Superfamily: Noctuoidea
- Family: Erebidae
- Subfamily: Arctiinae
- Genus: Amata
- Species: A. simplex

Binomial name
- Amata simplex (Walker, 1854)

Synonyms
- Syntomis simplex Walker, 1854; Syntomis corvus Wallengren, 1860; Syntomis monedula Wallengren, 1860; Syntomis nostalis Walker, 1854

Species of moth

Amata simplex is a moth of the family Erebidae. It was described by Francis Walker in 1854. It is found in the Democratic Republic of the Congo and South Africa.
