= Amata benitonis =

Scientific classification
- Kingdom: Animalia
- Phylum: Arthropoda
- Clade: Pancrustacea
- Class: Insecta
- Order: Lepidoptera
- Superfamily: Noctuoidea
- Family: Erebidae
- Subfamily: Arctiinae
- Genus: Amata
- Species: A. benitonis

Binomial name
- Amata benitonis (Strand, 1912)

Synonyms
- Syntomis benitonis Strand, 1912

Species of moth

Amata benitonis is a moth of the family Erebidae. It was described by Strand in 1912. It is found in Equatorial Guinea.
