= Amata gigas =

Scientific classification
- Domain: Eukaryota
- Kingdom: Animalia
- Phylum: Arthropoda
- Class: Insecta
- Order: Lepidoptera
- Superfamily: Noctuoidea
- Family: Erebidae
- Subfamily: Arctiinae
- Genus: Amata
- Species: A. gigas

Binomial name
- Amata gigas (Rothschild, 1910)

Synonyms
- Callitomis gigas Rothschild, 1910

Species of moth

Amata gigas is a moth of the subfamily Arctiinae. It was described by Walter Rothschild in 1910. It is found on Sulawesi.
