= Amata paraula =

Scientific classification
- Kingdom: Animalia
- Phylum: Arthropoda
- Class: Insecta
- Order: Lepidoptera
- Superfamily: Noctuoidea
- Family: Erebidae
- Subfamily: Arctiinae
- Genus: Amata
- Species: A. paraula

Binomial name
- Amata paraula (Meyrick, 1886)

Synonyms
- Hydrusa paraula Meyrick, 1886

Species of moth

Amata paraula is a species of moth of the family Erebidae first described by Edward Meyrick in 1886. It is found in Australia, where it has been recorded from the Northern Territory and Queensland.

The wingspan is about 30 mm. The abdomen is banded with black and yellow.
