= Amata pleurosticta =

Scientific classification
- Kingdom: Animalia
- Phylum: Arthropoda
- Class: Insecta
- Order: Lepidoptera
- Superfamily: Noctuoidea
- Family: Erebidae
- Subfamily: Arctiinae
- Genus: Amata
- Species: A. pleurosticta

Binomial name
- Amata pleurosticta (Hampson, 1898)

Synonyms
- Ceryx pleurosticta Hampson, 1898

Species of moth

Amata pleurosticta is a moth of the subfamily Arctiinae. It was described by George Hampson in 1898. It is found on Borneo. The habitat consists of lowland areas.

Adults are small and have transparent patches on their wings.
