= Amata fruhstorferi =

Scientific classification
- Kingdom: Animalia
- Phylum: Arthropoda
- Clade: Pancrustacea
- Class: Insecta
- Order: Lepidoptera
- Superfamily: Noctuoidea
- Family: Erebidae
- Subfamily: Arctiinae
- Genus: Amata
- Species: A. fruhstorferi

Binomial name
- Amata fruhstorferi (Hampson, 1898)

Synonyms
- Callitomis fruhstorferi Hampson, 1898

Species of moth

Amata fruhstorferi is a moth of the subfamily Arctiinae. It was described by George Hampson in 1898. It is found on Sulawesi.
