= Amata lagosensis =

Scientific classification
- Kingdom: Animalia
- Phylum: Arthropoda
- Class: Insecta
- Order: Lepidoptera
- Superfamily: Noctuoidea
- Family: Erebidae
- Subfamily: Arctiinae
- Genus: Amata
- Species: A. lagosensis

Binomial name
- Amata lagosensis (Hampson, 1907)

Synonyms
- Syntomis lagosensis Hampson, 1907

Species of moth

Amata lagosensis is a moth of the family Erebidae. It was described by George Hampson in 1907. It is found in Nigeria.
