= Amata thoracica =

Scientific classification
- Domain: Eukaryota
- Kingdom: Animalia
- Phylum: Arthropoda
- Class: Insecta
- Order: Lepidoptera
- Superfamily: Noctuoidea
- Family: Erebidae
- Subfamily: Arctiinae
- Genus: Amata
- Species: A. thoracica

Binomial name
- Amata thoracica Moore, 1877

Species of moth

Amata thoracica is a moth of the family Erebidae. It is found in Sri Lanka, mostly from wet zone forests.
