= Amata pseudextensa =

Scientific classification
- Domain: Eukaryota
- Kingdom: Animalia
- Phylum: Arthropoda
- Class: Insecta
- Order: Lepidoptera
- Superfamily: Noctuoidea
- Family: Erebidae
- Subfamily: Arctiinae
- Genus: Amata
- Species: A. pseudextensa

Binomial name
- Amata pseudextensa Rothschild, 1910

Species of moth

Amata pseudextensa is a species of moth of the family Erebidae first described by Walter Rothschild in 1910. It is found on Borneo.
