= Amata expandens =

Scientific classification
- Kingdom: Animalia
- Phylum: Arthropoda
- Class: Insecta
- Order: Lepidoptera
- Superfamily: Noctuoidea
- Family: Erebidae
- Subfamily: Arctiinae
- Genus: Amata
- Species: A. expandens

Binomial name
- Amata expandens (Walker, 1862)

Synonyms
- Syntomis expandens Walker, 1862; Syntomoides inequalis Snellen, 1895; Ceryx ericssoni Rothschild, 1910; Ceryx expandens

Species of moth

Amata expandens is a species of moth of the family Erebidae first described by Francis Walker in 1862. It is found in Sundaland. The habitat consists of lowland areas.
