= Amata stictoptera =

Scientific classification
- Domain: Eukaryota
- Kingdom: Animalia
- Phylum: Arthropoda
- Class: Insecta
- Order: Lepidoptera
- Superfamily: Noctuoidea
- Family: Erebidae
- Subfamily: Arctiinae
- Genus: Amata
- Species: A. stictoptera

Binomial name
- Amata stictoptera Rothschild, 1910

Species of moth

Amata stictoptera is a moth of the family Erebidae. It was described by Rothschild in 1910. It is found in Ivory Coast.
