= Amata xanthosoma =

Scientific classification
- Domain: Eukaryota
- Kingdom: Animalia
- Phylum: Arthropoda
- Class: Insecta
- Order: Lepidoptera
- Superfamily: Noctuoidea
- Family: Erebidae
- Subfamily: Arctiinae
- Genus: Amata
- Species: A. xanthosoma

Binomial name
- Amata xanthosoma (Turner, 1898)

Synonyms
- Hydrusa xanthosoma Turner, 1898; Syntomis cremnotherma Lower, 1900; Amata tunneyi Rothschild, 1910

Species of moth

Amata xanthosoma, the yellow tiger moth, is a species of moth of the family Erebidae first described by Alfred Jefferis Turner in 1898. It is found in the northern part of the Australian state of Western Australia.

The wingspan is about 25 mm. Adults are yellow with brown spots.
