= Amata polidamon =

Scientific classification
- Domain: Eukaryota
- Kingdom: Animalia
- Phylum: Arthropoda
- Class: Insecta
- Order: Lepidoptera
- Superfamily: Noctuoidea
- Family: Erebidae
- Subfamily: Arctiinae
- Genus: Amata
- Species: A. polidamon

Binomial name
- Amata polidamon (Cramer, 1779)

Synonyms
- Sphinx polidamon Cramer, 1779; Amata polydamon; Cacoethes polidamon; Syntomis polidamon; Zygaena polidamon

Species of moth

Amata polidamon is a moth of the family Erebidae. It was described by Pieter Cramer in 1779. It is found in South Africa.
