= Amata magrettii =

Scientific classification
- Kingdom: Animalia
- Phylum: Arthropoda
- Class: Insecta
- Order: Lepidoptera
- Superfamily: Noctuoidea
- Family: Erebidae
- Subfamily: Arctiinae
- Genus: Amata
- Species: A. magrettii

Binomial name
- Amata magrettii Berio, 1937

Species of moth

Amata magrettii is a moth of the family Erebidae. It was described by Emilio Berio in 1937 and is found in Eritrea.
