= Amata dilatata =

Scientific classification
- Kingdom: Animalia
- Phylum: Arthropoda
- Class: Insecta
- Order: Lepidoptera
- Superfamily: Noctuoidea
- Family: Erebidae
- Subfamily: Arctiinae
- Genus: Amata
- Species: A. dilatata

Binomial name
- Amata dilatata (Snellen, 1880)

Synonyms
- Syntomis dilatata Snellen, 1880; Syntomis euryptera Hampson, 1898

Species of moth

Amata dilatata is a species of moth of the family Erebidae first described by Snellen in 1880. It is found on Sumatra, Nias, Peninsular Malaysia, Borneo and the Natuna Islands.
