= Amata stenoptera =

Scientific classification
- Domain: Eukaryota
- Kingdom: Animalia
- Phylum: Arthropoda
- Class: Insecta
- Order: Lepidoptera
- Superfamily: Noctuoidea
- Family: Erebidae
- Subfamily: Arctiinae
- Genus: Amata
- Species: A. stenoptera

Binomial name
- Amata stenoptera Zerny, 1912

Synonyms
- Amata attenuata Rothschild, 1910 (preocc.)

Species of moth

Amata stenoptera is a moth of the family Erebidae. It was described by Zerny in 1912. It is found in Kenya.
