= Amata johanna =

Scientific classification
- Domain: Eukaryota
- Kingdom: Animalia
- Phylum: Arthropoda
- Class: Insecta
- Order: Lepidoptera
- Superfamily: Noctuoidea
- Family: Erebidae
- Subfamily: Arctiinae
- Genus: Amata
- Species: A. johanna

Binomial name
- Amata johanna (Butler, 1876)

Synonyms
- Syntomis johanna Butler, 1876; Syntomis anna Butler, 1876

Species of moth

Amata johanna is a moth of the family Erebidae. It was described by Arthur Gardiner Butler in 1876. It is found in Nigeria and South Africa.
