= Amata choneutospila =

Scientific classification
- Domain: Eukaryota
- Kingdom: Animalia
- Phylum: Arthropoda
- Class: Insecta
- Order: Lepidoptera
- Superfamily: Noctuoidea
- Family: Erebidae
- Subfamily: Arctiinae
- Genus: Amata
- Species: A. choneutospila

Binomial name
- Amata choneutospila (Turner, 1905)

Synonyms
- Syntomis choneutospila Turner, 1905

Species of moth

Amata choneutospila is a species of moth of the subfamily Arctiinae first described by Alfred Jefferis Turner in 1905. It is found in Australia.
