= Amata obraztsovi =

Scientific classification
- Kingdom: Animalia
- Phylum: Arthropoda
- Class: Insecta
- Order: Lepidoptera
- Superfamily: Noctuoidea
- Family: Erebidae
- Subfamily: Arctiinae
- Genus: Amata
- Species: A. obraztsovi

Binomial name
- Amata obraztsovi Kiriakoff, 1954

Species of moth

Amata obraztsovi is a moth of the family Erebidae. It was described by Sergius G. Kiriakoff in 1954. It is found in the Democratic Republic of the Congo.
