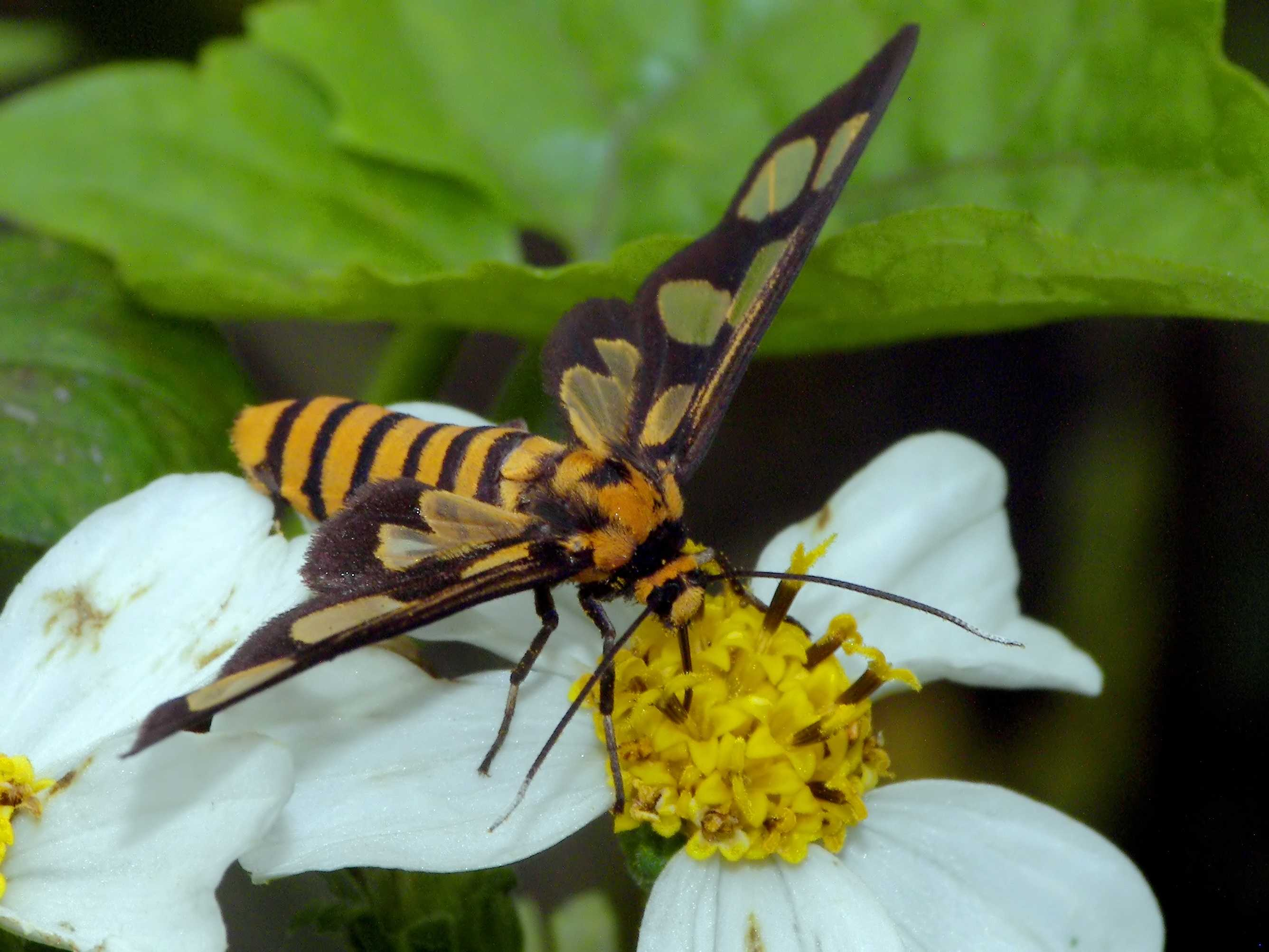

Scientific classification
- Kingdom: Animalia
- Phylum: Arthropoda
- Class: Insecta
- Order: Lepidoptera
- Superfamily: Noctuoidea
- Family: Erebidae
- Subfamily: Arctiinae
- Genus: Amata
- Species: A. polymita

Binomial name
- Amata polymita (Linnaeus, 1768)

Synonyms
- Sphinx polymita Linnaeus, 1768; Syntomis polymita; Sphinx fenestrata Drury, 1773; Zygaena thelebus Fabricius, 1787

= Amata polymita =

Tiger-striped clearwing moth

Species of moth

Amata polymita, the tiger-striped clearwing moth, is a moth of the family Erebidae. The species was first described by Carl Linnaeus in 1768. It is found in China and Vietnam.

The wingspan is about 35 mm.

The larvae feed on Breynia fruticosa and Gyaura crepidioidea.
