= Amata hellei =

Scientific classification
- Kingdom: Animalia
- Phylum: Arthropoda
- Class: Insecta
- Order: Lepidoptera
- Superfamily: Noctuoidea
- Family: Erebidae
- Subfamily: Arctiinae
- Genus: Amata
- Species: A. hellei

Binomial name
- Amata hellei (Romieux, 1935)

Synonyms
- Syntomis hellei Romieux, 1935

Species of moth

Amata hellei is a moth of the family Erebidae. It was described by Romieux in 1935. It is found in the Democratic Republic of Congo.
