= Amata magnopupillata =

Scientific classification
- Domain: Eukaryota
- Kingdom: Animalia
- Phylum: Arthropoda
- Class: Insecta
- Order: Lepidoptera
- Superfamily: Noctuoidea
- Family: Erebidae
- Subfamily: Arctiinae
- Genus: Amata
- Species: A. magnopupillata

Binomial name
- Amata magnopupillata Berio, 1941

Species of moth

Amata magnopupillata is a moth of the family Erebidae. It was described by Emilio Berio in 1941 and is found in Eritrea.
