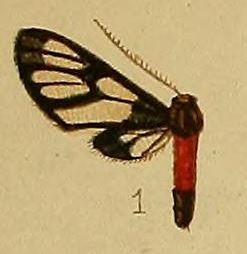

Scientific classification
- Kingdom: Animalia
- Phylum: Arthropoda
- Class: Insecta
- Order: Lepidoptera
- Superfamily: Noctuoidea
- Family: Erebidae
- Subfamily: Arctiinae
- Genus: Amata
- Species: A. hemiphoenica

Binomial name
- Amata hemiphoenica (Hampson, 1910)

Synonyms
- Syntomis hemiphoenica Hampson, 1910

= Amata hemiphoenica =

Species of moth

Amata hemiphoenica is a moth of the family Erebidae. It was described by George Hampson in 1910. It is found in the Democratic Republic of the Congo.
