= Amata chlorometis =

Scientific classification
- Kingdom: Animalia
- Phylum: Arthropoda
- Class: Insecta
- Order: Lepidoptera
- Superfamily: Noctuoidea
- Family: Erebidae
- Subfamily: Arctiinae
- Genus: Amata
- Species: A. chlorometis

Binomial name
- Amata chlorometis (Meyrick, 1886)

Synonyms
- Hydrusa chlorometis Meyrick, 1886

Species of moth

Amata chlorometis is a species of moth of the subfamily Arctiinae first described by Edward Meyrick in 1886. It is found in New South Wales, Australia.
