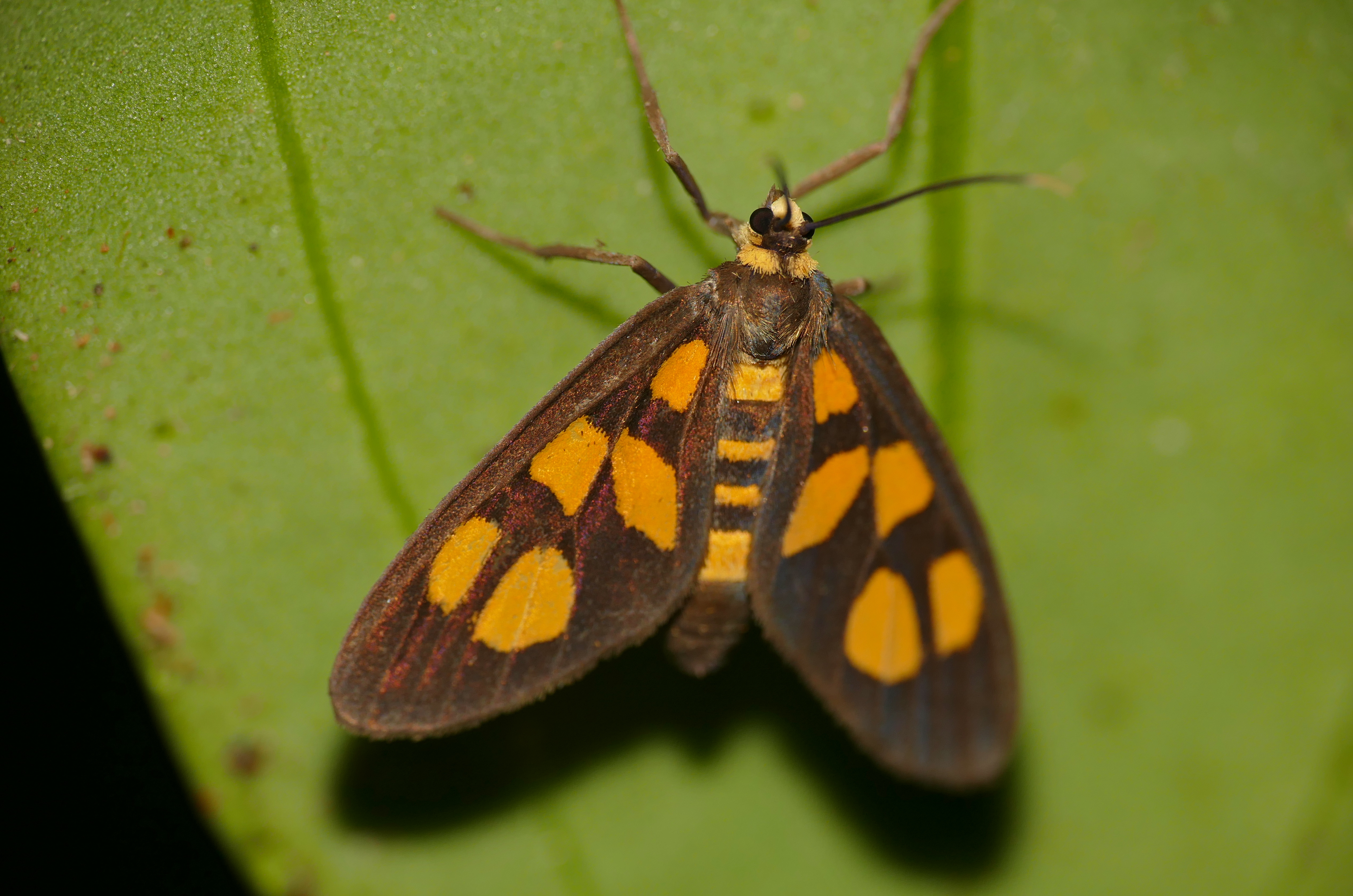

Scientific classification
- Kingdom: Animalia
- Phylum: Arthropoda
- Class: Insecta
- Order: Lepidoptera
- Superfamily: Noctuoidea
- Family: Erebidae
- Subfamily: Arctiinae
- Genus: Amata
- Species: A. tetragonaria

Binomial name
- Amata tetragonaria (Walker, 1862)

Synonyms
- Syntomis tetragonaria Walker, 1862

= Amata tetragonaria =

Species of moth

Amata tetragonaria is a species of moth of the family Erebidae first described by Francis Walker in 1862. It is found on Borneo and the Natuna Islands.
