= Amata aperta =

Scientific classification
- Kingdom: Animalia
- Phylum: Arthropoda
- Class: Insecta
- Order: Lepidoptera
- Superfamily: Noctuoidea
- Family: Erebidae
- Subfamily: Arctiinae
- Genus: Amata
- Species: A. aperta

Binomial name
- Amata aperta (Walker, [1865])

Synonyms
- Syntomis aperta Walker, [1865]; Sphinx polydamon Cramer, [1779]; Hydrusa mochlotis Meyrick, 1886; Hydrusa nesothetis Meyrick, 1886

Species of moth

Amata aperta is a species of moth of the family Erebidae first described by Francis Walker in 1865. It is found in Australia (Queensland, New South Wales and Victoria) and New Guinea.
