= Amata distorta =

Scientific classification
- Domain: Eukaryota
- Kingdom: Animalia
- Phylum: Arthropoda
- Class: Insecta
- Order: Lepidoptera
- Superfamily: Noctuoidea
- Family: Erebidae
- Subfamily: Arctiinae
- Genus: Amata
- Species: A. distorta

Binomial name
- Amata distorta (Rothschild, 1910)

Synonyms
- Callitomis distorta Rothschild, 1910

Species of moth

Amata distorta is a moth of the subfamily Arctiinae. It was described by Walter Rothschild in 1910. The type location is listed as J.Pulo Bisa bei Obi.
