= Amata pactolina =

Scientific classification
- Kingdom: Animalia
- Phylum: Arthropoda
- Class: Insecta
- Order: Lepidoptera
- Superfamily: Noctuoidea
- Family: Erebidae
- Subfamily: Arctiinae
- Genus: Amata
- Species: A. pactolina

Binomial name
- Amata pactolina (Walker, [1865])

Synonyms
- Syntomis pactolina Walker, [1865]; Hydrosa sphenophora Turner, 1898

Species of moth

Amata pactolina is a species of moth of the family Erebidae first described by Francis Walker in 1865. It is found in Australia.
