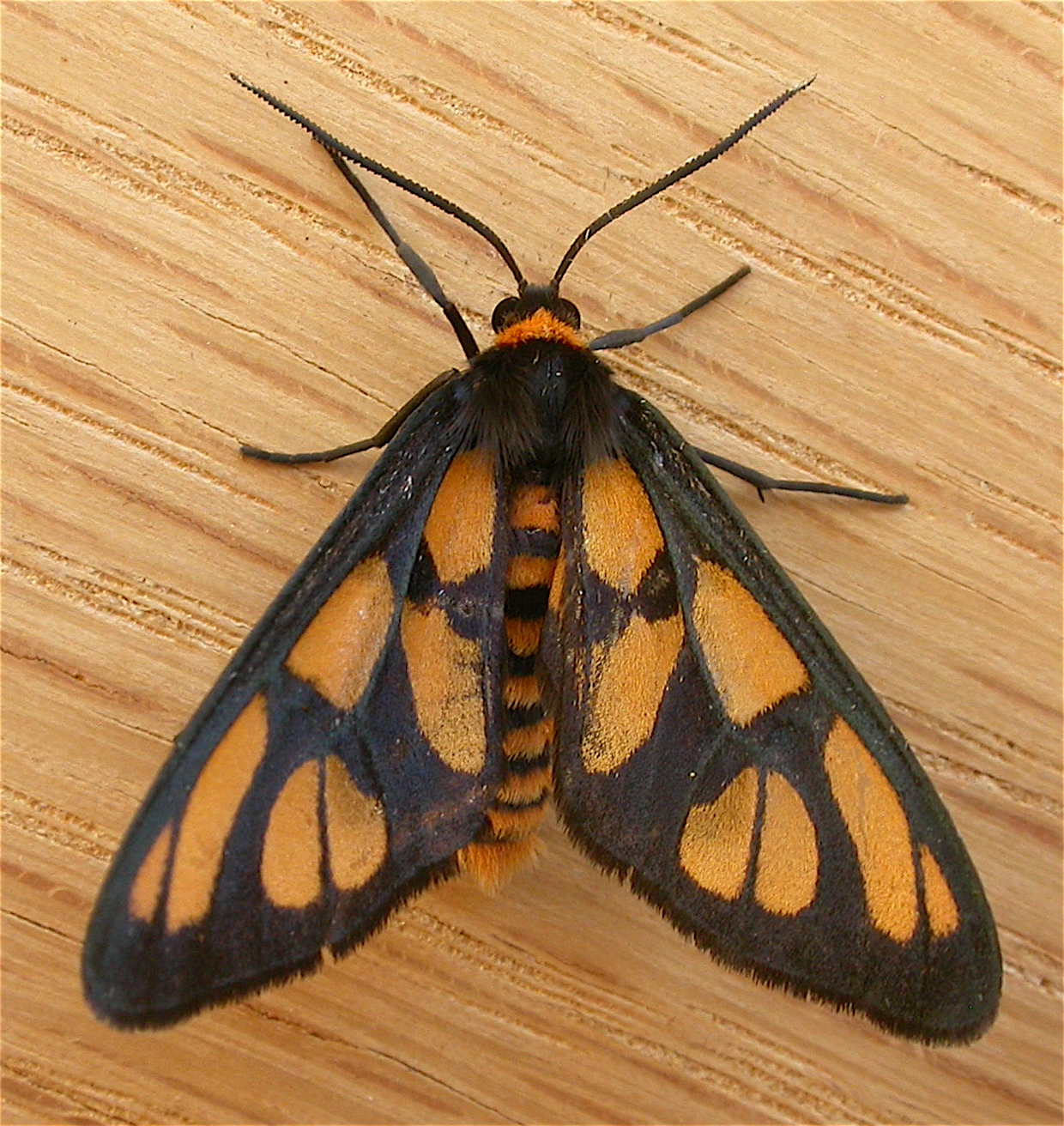
- Amata trigonophora

Scientific classification
- Domain: Eukaryota
- Kingdom: Animalia
- Phylum: Arthropoda
- Class: Insecta
- Order: Lepidoptera
- Superfamily: Noctuoidea
- Family: Erebidae
- Subfamily: Arctiinae
- Tribe: Syntomini
- Genus: Amata; Fabricius, 1807

Type species
- Zygaena passalis Fabricius, 1781

Synonyms
- Syntomis Ochsenheimer, 1808; Buthysia Wallengren, 1863; Cacoethes Hübner, 1819; Coenochromia Hübner, [1819]; Syntoma Billberg, 1820; Hydrusa Walker, 1854; Asinusca Wallengren, 1862; Asinutea Wallengren, 1863; Asinusca Wallengren, 1865; Callitomis Butler, 1876; Leopoldina Hering, 1934; Vitronaclia Griveaud, 1964

= Amata (moth) =

Genus of moths

Amata is a genus of tiger moths in the family Erebidae. The genus was erected by Johan Christian Fabricius in 1807.

== Selected species ==
The Global Biodiversity Information Facility includes:

1. Amata acrospila Felder, 1874
2. Amata actea Swinhoe, 1891
3. Amata adjuncta Walker
4. Amata aequipuncta Turati, 1917
5. Amata affinis Rothschild, 1920
6. Amata albapex Hampson, 1893
7. Amata alberti Rothschild, 1911
8. Amata albertiana Obraztsov, 1966
9. Amata albicornis Rothschild, 1910
10. Amata albifrons Moore, 1878
11. Amata albobasis Kiriakoff, 1954
12. Amata alenicola Strand, 1912
13. Amata alicia Butler, 1876
14. Amata alikangiensis Strand, 1915
15. Amata anatolica Zerny, 1931
16. Amata annulata Fabricius, 1775
17. Amata antiochena Lederer, 1861
18. Amata antitecta Turner
19. Amata antitheta Meyrick, 1886
20. Amata aperta Walker
21. Amata apicelisa Holloway, 1988
22. Amata artapha Schaus
23. Amata assamica Rothschild
24. Amata atricornis Wallengren, 1863
25. Amata atricornuta Gaede, 1926
26. Amata aurantiaca Warnecke, 1934
27. Amata aurantiifrons Rothschild, 1911
28. Amata aurea Swinhoe, 1908
29. Amata aurivalva Schawerda, 1923
30. Amata aurofasciata Swinhoe, 1892
31. Amata bactriana Erschoff, 1874
32. Amata banguia Schaus, 1928
33. Amata basigera Walker
34. Amata basithyris Hampson, 1914
35. Amata benitonis Strand, 1912
36. Amata berinda Moore, 1878
37. Amata bicincta Kollar, 1844
38. Amata bicolor Walker, 1854
39. Amata bifasciata Hopffer, 1857
40. Amata bokkeveldensis de Freina, 2015
41. Amata bondo Kiriakoff, 1965
42. Amata borgoriensis Roepke, 1937
43. Amata borneogena Obraztsov, 1955
44. Amata brooksi Holloway, 1988
45. Amata bryoponda Obraztsov, 1954
46. Amata caerulescens Druce, 1898
47. Amata calidupensis Rothschild
48. Amata cantori (Moore, 1859)
49. Amata caspia Staudinger, 1877
50. Amata celebesa Walker, 1864
51. Amata cerbera Linnaeus, 1764
52. Amata cerberella Strand, 1917
53. Amata ceres Oberthür, 1878
54. Amata chekianga Obraztsov, 1966
55. Amata chlorocera Hampson, 1892
56. Amata chlorometis Meyrick, 1886
57. Amata chloroscia Hampson, 1901
58. Amata cholmlei Hampson, 1907
59. Amata choneutospila Turner, 1905
60. Amata chroma Swinhoe, 1892
61. Amata chromatica Turner, 1905
62. Amata chrysozona Hampson, 1898
63. Amata cinctelisa Holloway, 1988
64. Amata cingulata Weber, 1801
65. Amata cocandica Erschoff, 1874
66. Amata compta Walker, 1869
67. Amata congener Hampson, 1901
68. Amata congenita Hampson
69. Amata connectens Rothschild, 1910
70. Amata consequa Leech, 1898
71. Amata consimilis Hampson, 1901
72. Amata creobota Holland, 1893
73. Amata croceizona Hampson, 1910
74. Amata cuckoolandia de Freina, 2018
75. Amata cuprizonata Hampson, 1901
76. Amata cyanea Hampson, 1914
77. Amata cyanura Meyrick, 1886
78. Amata cymatilis Swinhoe, 1892
79. Amata cyssea Stoll, 1782
80. Amata damarensis Grünberg, 1910
81. Amata dapontes Schaus, 1928
82. Amata decorata (Walker, 1862)
83. Amata deflavata Gaede, 1926
84. Amata deflocca Swinhoe, 1892
85. Amata democharis Schaus, 1928
86. Amata democles Schaus, 1928
87. Amata derivata (Walker, 1862)
88. Amata dichotoma Leech, 1898
89. Amata dichotomoides Obraztsov, 1966
90. Amata dilatata (Snellen, 1881)
91. Amata dilateralis Hampson, 1898
92. Amata dimorpha Bytinski-Salz, 1939
93. Amata discata Druce, 1898
94. Amata distorta Rothschild, 1910
95. Amata divisa Walker, 1854
96. Amata dohertyi Hampson, 1890
97. Amata dyschlaena Turner, 1905
98. Amata ebertorum Koçak & Kemal, 2015
99. Amata edwardsi Butler, 1876
100. Amata egenaria (Walker, 1862)
101. Amata eleonora Schaus, 1928
102. Amata elisa (Butler, 1876)
103. Amata elisoides Holloway, 1988
104. Amata elongata Hampson, 1900
105. Amata elongimacula (Hampson, 1898)
106. Amata elwesi Rothschild, 1910
107. Amata endocrocis Hampson
108. Amata era Swinhoe, 1891
109. Amata euryzona Leech, 1898
110. Amata exapta (Swinhoe, 1892)
111. Amata expandens (Walker, 1862)
112. Amata extensa Walker, 1866
113. Amata fenestrata Walker
114. Amata fervida Walker, 1854
115. Amata flava Wileman, 1910
116. Amata flavibrooksi Holloway, 1988
117. Amata flavifenestrata van Eecke, 1920
118. Amata flavifrons Hampson, 1892
119. Amata flavoanalis Seitz, 1926
120. Amata formosae Butler, 1876
121. Amata formosensis (Wileman, 1928)
122. Amata fortunei (d'Orza, 1869) – white-spotted moth
123. Amata fouqueti de Joannis, 1912
124. Amata francisca (Butler, 1876)
125. Amata fruhstorferi Rothschild, 1910
126. Amata gelatina Hampson, 1890
127. Amata genzana Matsumura, 1927
128. Amata geon Druce, 1885
129. Amata germana Felder, 1862
130. Amata gigas (Rothschild, 1910)
131. Amata gil Witt et al., 2007
132. Amata goodi Holland, 1893
133. Amata gracillima Aurivillius, 1925
134. Amata grahami Obraztsov, 1966
135. Amata grotei Moore, 1871
136. Amata handelmazzettii Zerny, 1931
137. Amata hellei (Romieux, 1935)
138. Amata hemiphoenica (Hampson, 1910)
139. Amata heptaspila Turner, 1905
140. Amata hesperitis Meyrick, 1886
141. Amata huebneri Boisduval, 1828
142. Amata humeralis Butler, 1876
143. Amata hyalota Meyrick, 1886
144. Amata hypomela Kiriakoff, 1954
145. Amata insularis Butler, 1876
146. Amata interniplaga (Mabille, 1890)
147. Amata jacksoni Rothschild, 1910
148. Amata janenschi Seitz, 1926
149. Amata johanna (Butler, 1876)
150. Amata kenredi (Rothschild, 1910)
151. Amata kinensis Hampson, 1898
152. Amata kruegeri Ragusa, 1904
153. Amata kuhlweini (Lefèbvre, 1832)
154. Amata lagosensis (Hampson, 1907)
155. Amata lampetis Turner, 1898
156. Amata lateralis (Boisduval, 1836)
157. Amata leimacis (Holland, 1893)
158. Amata leucacma Meyrick, 1886
159. Amata leucerythra (Holland, 1893)
160. Amata leucosoma (Butler, 1876)
161. Amata lucta Lucas, 1901
162. Amata luzonensis (Wileman & West, 1925)
163. Amata macroflavifer Holloway, 1988
164. Amata macroplaca Meyrick, 1886
165. Amata magistri Turner, 1905
166. Amata magnopupillata Berio, 1941
167. Amata magrettii Berio, 1937
168. Amata marella Butler, 1876
169. Amata marina (Butler, 1876)
170. Amata marinoides Kiriakoff, 1954
171. Amata marjana Stauder, 1913
172. Amata melitospila Turner, 1905
173. Amata mestralii Bugnion, 1837
174. Amata miozona (Hampson, 1910)
175. Amata mjobergi Talbot, 1926
176. Amata mogadorensis Blachier, 1908
177. Amata monothyris Hampson, 1914
178. Amata monticola (Aurivillius, 1910)
179. Amata multicincta (Hampson, 1914)
180. Amata multifasciata (Hampson, [1893])
181. Amata nigriceps Butler, 1876
182. Amata nigricilia (Strand, 1912)
183. Amata nigricornis Alphéraky, 1883
184. Amata nigrobasalis Rothschild, 1910
185. Amata ntebi (Bethune-Baker, 1911)
186. Amata obraztsovi Kiriakoff, 1954
187. Amata ochrospila Turner, 1922
188. Amata olinda Swinhoe, 1892
189. Amata orphnaea Turner, 1898
190. Amata pactolina Walker, 1865
191. Amata paradelpha Turner, 1905
192. Amata paraula Meyrick, 1886
193. Amata passalis (Fabricius, 1781)
194. Amata pembertoni Rothschild, 1910
195. Amata perixanthia (Hampson, 1898)
196. Amata pfeifferae (Moore, 1859)
197. Amata phaeobasis (Hampson, 1907)
198. Amata phaeochyta Turner, 1907
199. Amata phaeososma Hampson, 1914
200. Amata phaeozona (Zerny, 1912)
201. Amata phegea Linnaeus, 1758 – nine-spotted moth
202. Amata phepsalotis Meyrick, 1886
203. Amata phoenicia (Hampson, 1898)
204. Amata pleurosticta (Hampson, 1898)
205. Amata ploetzi (Strand, 1912)
206. Amata polidamon (Cramer, 1779)
207. Amata polymita Linnaeus, 1768 – tiger-striped clearwing moth
208. Amata polyxo (Fawcett, 1918)
209. Amata prepuncta Holloway, 1988
210. Amata prosomoea Turner, 1905
211. Amata pryeri Hampson, 1898
212. Amata pseudextensa Rothschild, 1910
213. Amata pseudosimplex de Freina, 2013
214. Amata pyrocoma Meyrick, 1886
215. Amata ragazzii Turati, 1917
216. Amata recedens Lucas, 1891
217. Amata rendalli (Distant, 1897)
218. Amata romeii Berio, 1941
219. Amata rubritincta (Hampson, 1903)
220. Amata rufina (Oberthür, 1878)
221. Amata schoutedeni Kiriakoff, 1954
222. Amata shirakii (Sonan, 1941)
223. Amata shoa (Hampson, 1898)
224. Amata similis (Le Cerf, 1922)
225. Amata simplex (Walker, 1854)
226. Amata soror (Le Cerf, 1922)
227. Amata sperbius (Fabricius, 1787)
228. Amata stanleyi (Kiriakoff, 1965)
229. Amata stenoptera (Zerny, 1912)
230. Amata stictoptera Rothschild, 1910
231. Amata symphona Swinhoe, 1907
232. Amata syntomoides Butler, 1876
233. Amata teinopera Hampson, 1898
234. Amata tenera Hulstaert, 1923
235. Amata tetragonaria Walker, 1862
236. Amata thoracica Moore, 1877
237. Amata tomasina (Butler, 1876)
238. Amata trifascia Holloway, 1976
239. Amata trigonophora Turner, 1898
240. Amata tripunctata (Bethune-Baker, 1911)
241. Amata tritonia (Hampson, 1911)
242. Amata uelleburgensis (Strand, 1912)
243. Amata velatipennis (Walker, 1864)
244. Amata vicarians Holloway, 1988
245. Amata waldowi (Grünberg, 1907)
246. Amata wallacei (Moore, 1859)
247. Amata williami Rothschild, 1910
248. Amata xanthopleura Hampson, 1914
249. Amata xanthosoma Turner, 1898
250. Amata xanthura Turner, 1905

== Gallery ==
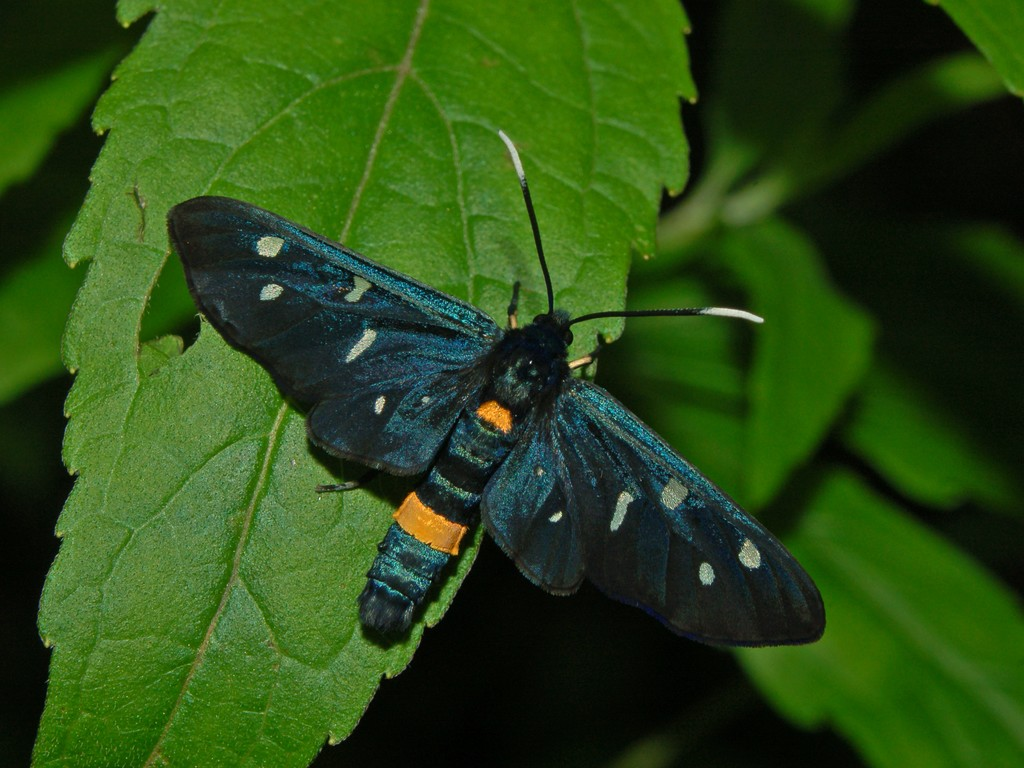
Amata phegea

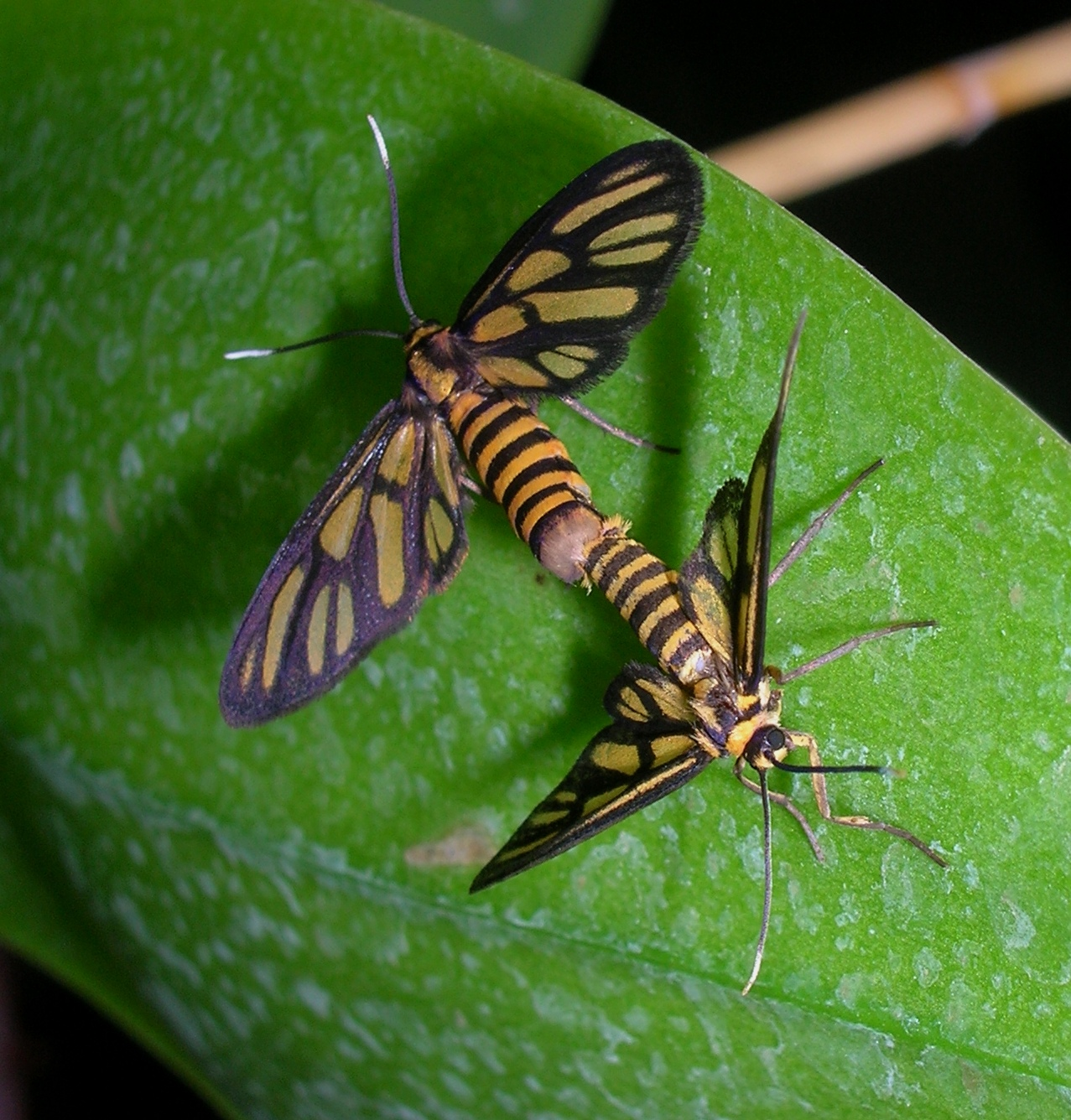
Amata species - mating

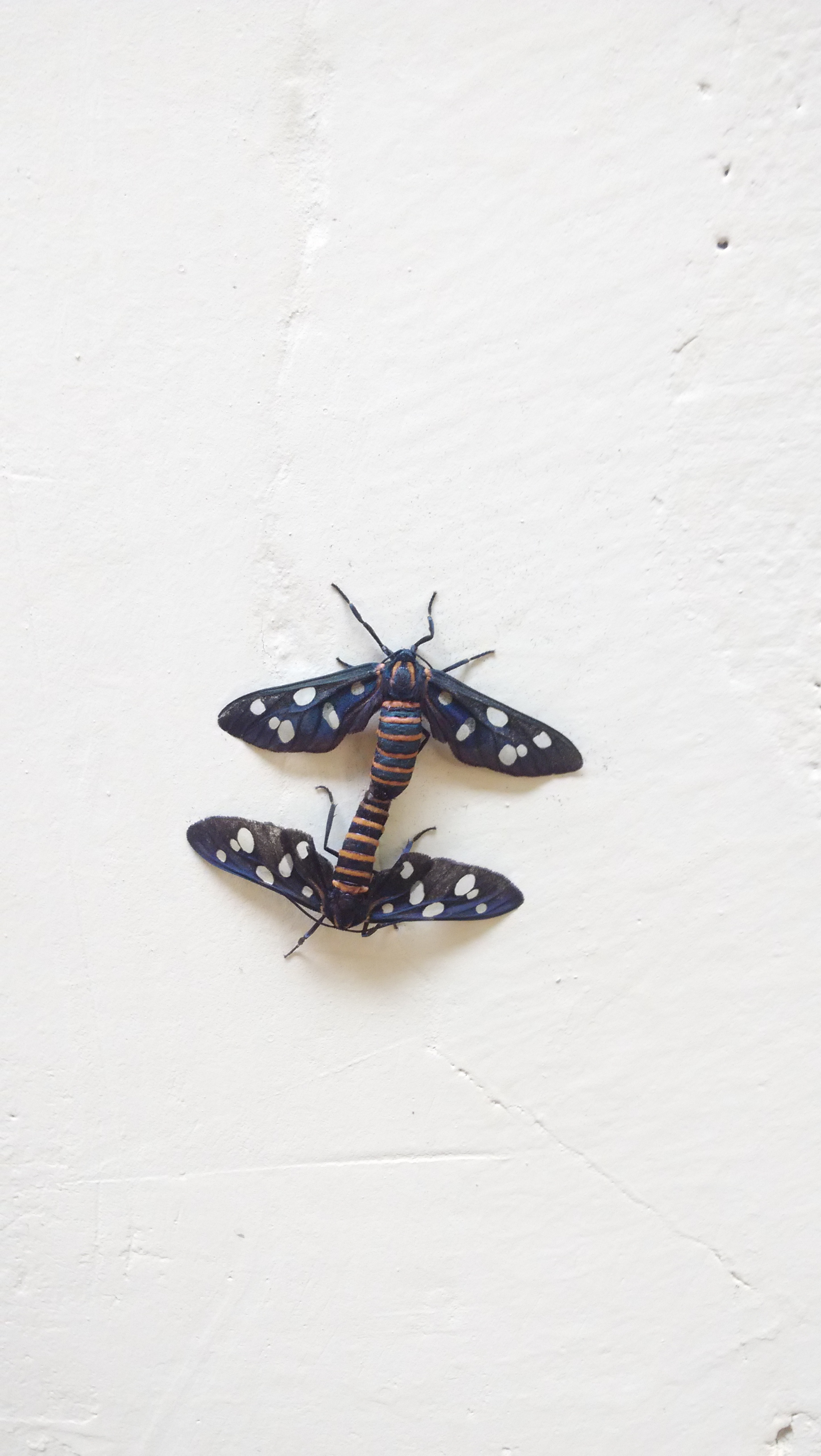
Mating of Amata passalis species from Thiruvananthapuram, India

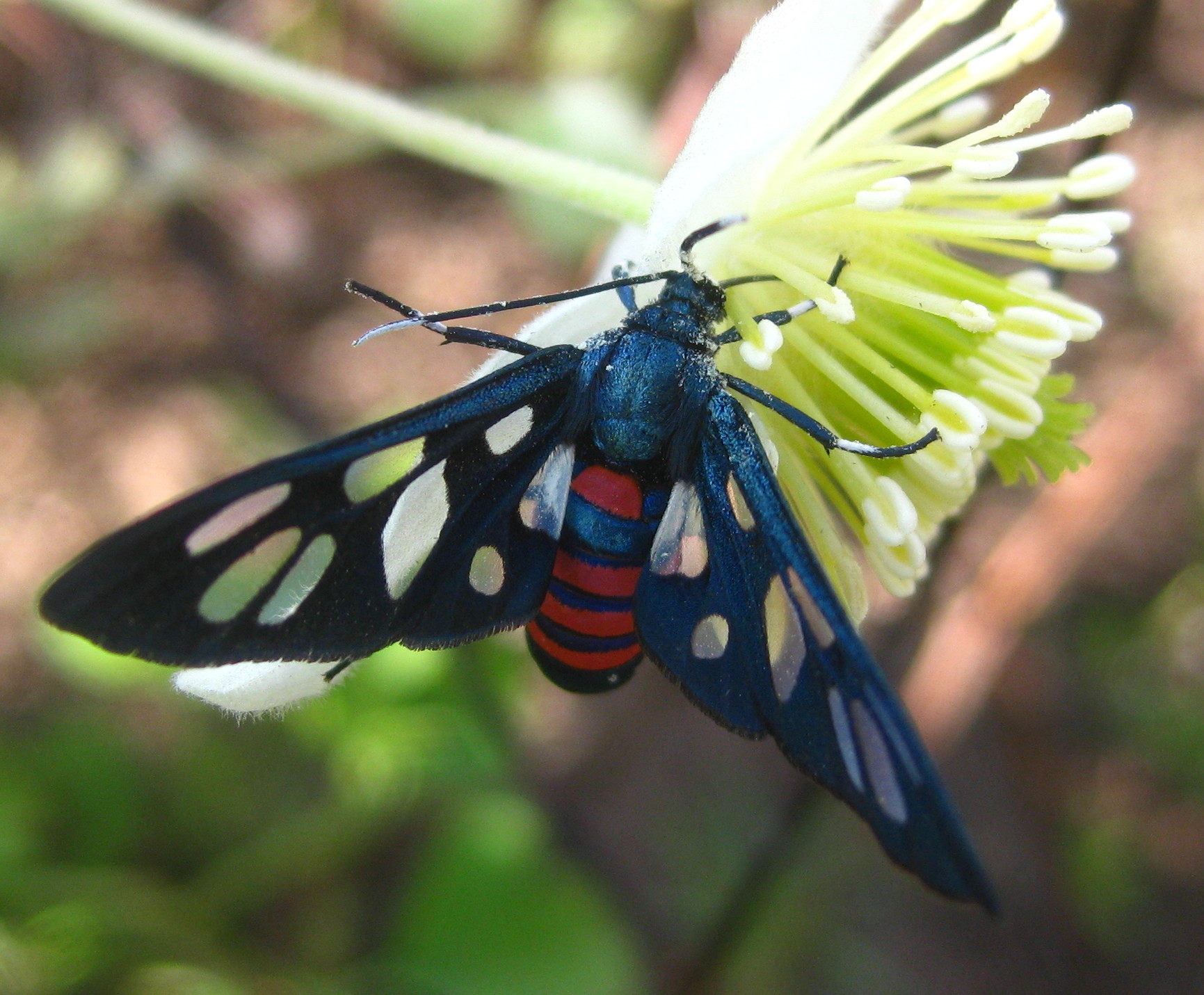
Amata alicia

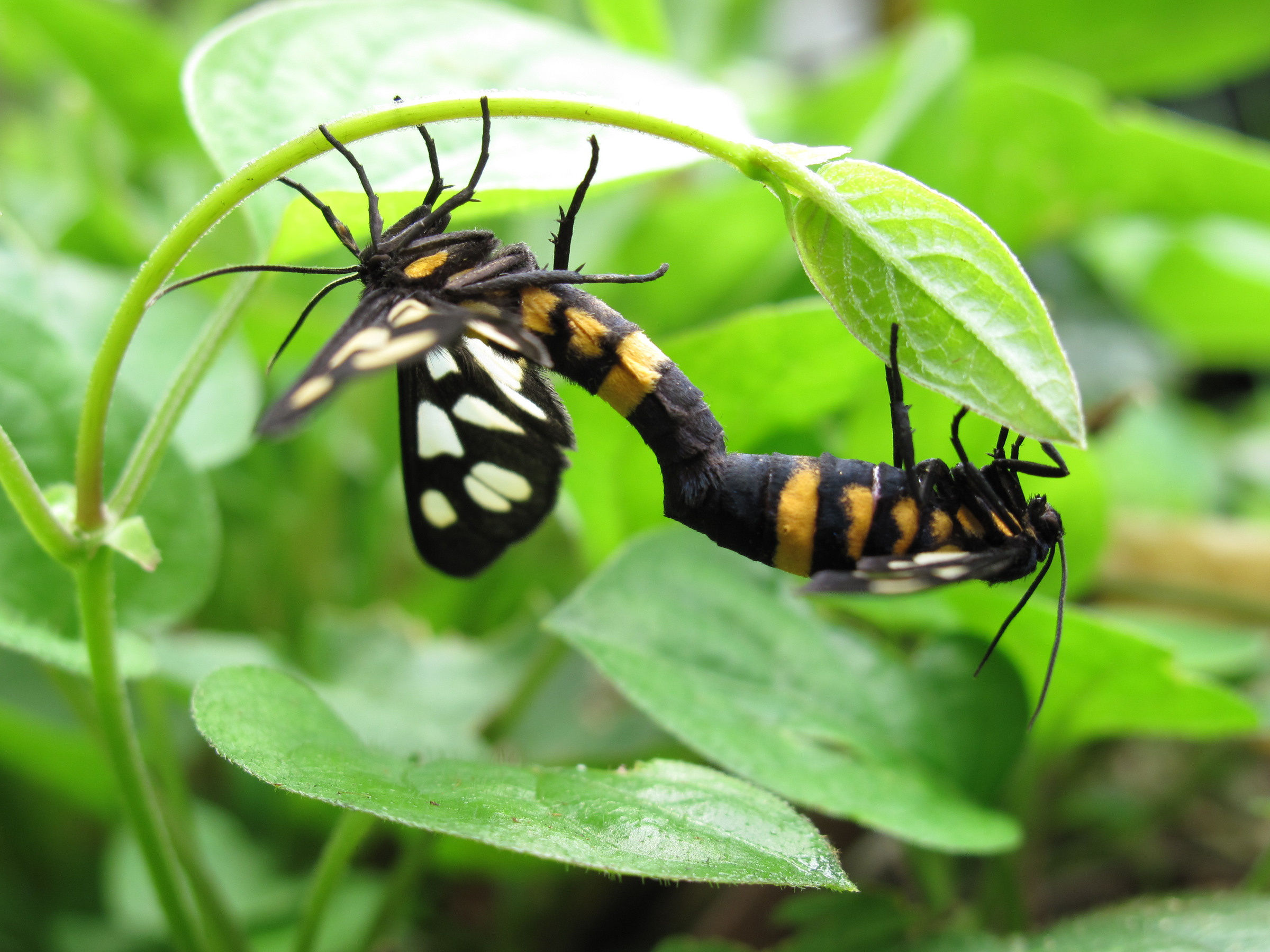
Amata fortunei

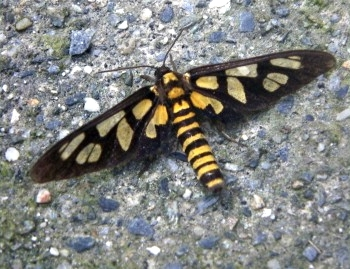
Amata perixanthia

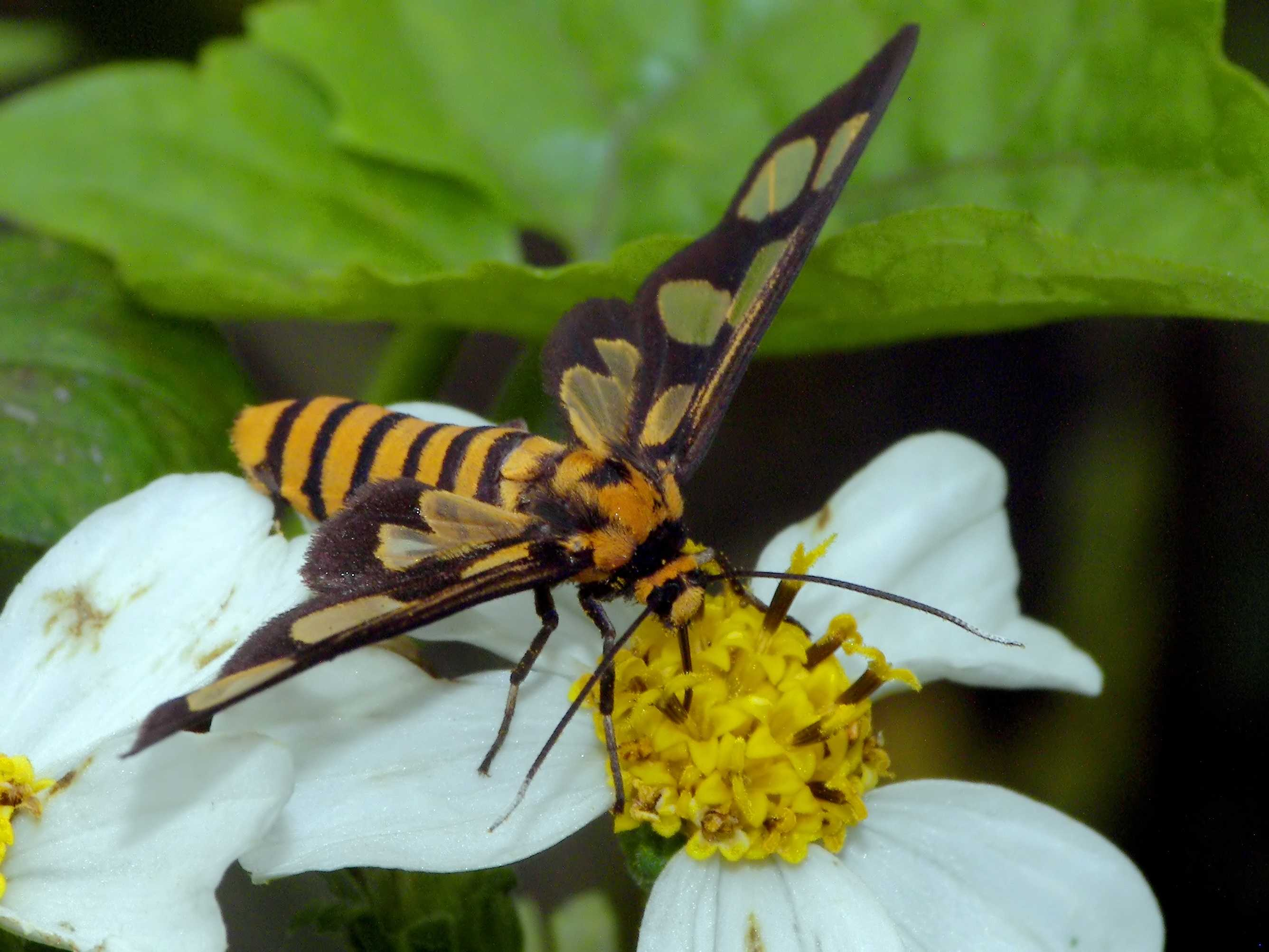
Amata polymita
