= Amata tenera =

Scientific classification
- Domain: Eukaryota
- Kingdom: Animalia
- Phylum: Arthropoda
- Class: Insecta
- Order: Lepidoptera
- Superfamily: Noctuoidea
- Family: Erebidae
- Subfamily: Arctiinae
- Genus: Amata
- Species: A. tenera

Binomial name
- Amata tenera Hulstaert, 1923

Species of moth

Amata tenera is a moth of the family Erebidae. It was described by Gustaaf Hulstaert in 1923. It is found in the Democratic Republic of the Congo.
