= Amata lateralis =

Scientific classification
- Kingdom: Animalia
- Phylum: Arthropoda
- Class: Insecta
- Order: Lepidoptera
- Superfamily: Noctuoidea
- Family: Erebidae
- Subfamily: Arctiinae
- Genus: Amata
- Species: A. lateralis

Binomial name
- Amata lateralis (Boisduval, 1836)

Synonyms
- Syntomis lateralis Boisduval, 1836; Syntomis marginalis Walker, 1854

Species of moth

Amata lateralis is a species of moth of the family Erebidae. It was described by Jean Baptiste Boisduval in 1836. It is found in Senegal.
