= Amata soror =

Scientific classification
- Domain: Eukaryota
- Kingdom: Animalia
- Phylum: Arthropoda
- Class: Insecta
- Order: Lepidoptera
- Superfamily: Noctuoidea
- Family: Erebidae
- Subfamily: Arctiinae
- Genus: Amata
- Species: A. soror

Binomial name
- Amata soror (Le Cerf, 1922)

Synonyms
- Syntomis soror Le Cerf, 1922

Species of moth

Amata soror is a moth of the family Erebidae. It was described by Ferdinand Le Cerf in 1922. It is found in Kenya.
