= Amata trifascia =

Scientific classification
- Kingdom: Animalia
- Phylum: Arthropoda
- Clade: Pancrustacea
- Class: Insecta
- Order: Lepidoptera
- Superfamily: Noctuoidea
- Family: Erebidae
- Subfamily: Arctiinae
- Genus: Amata
- Species: A. trifascia

Binomial name
- Amata trifascia (Holloway, 1976)

Synonyms
- Callitomis trifascia Holloway, 1976

Species of moth

Amata trifascia is a species of moth in the family Erebidae first described by Jeremy Daniel Holloway in 1976. It is found on Borneo.
