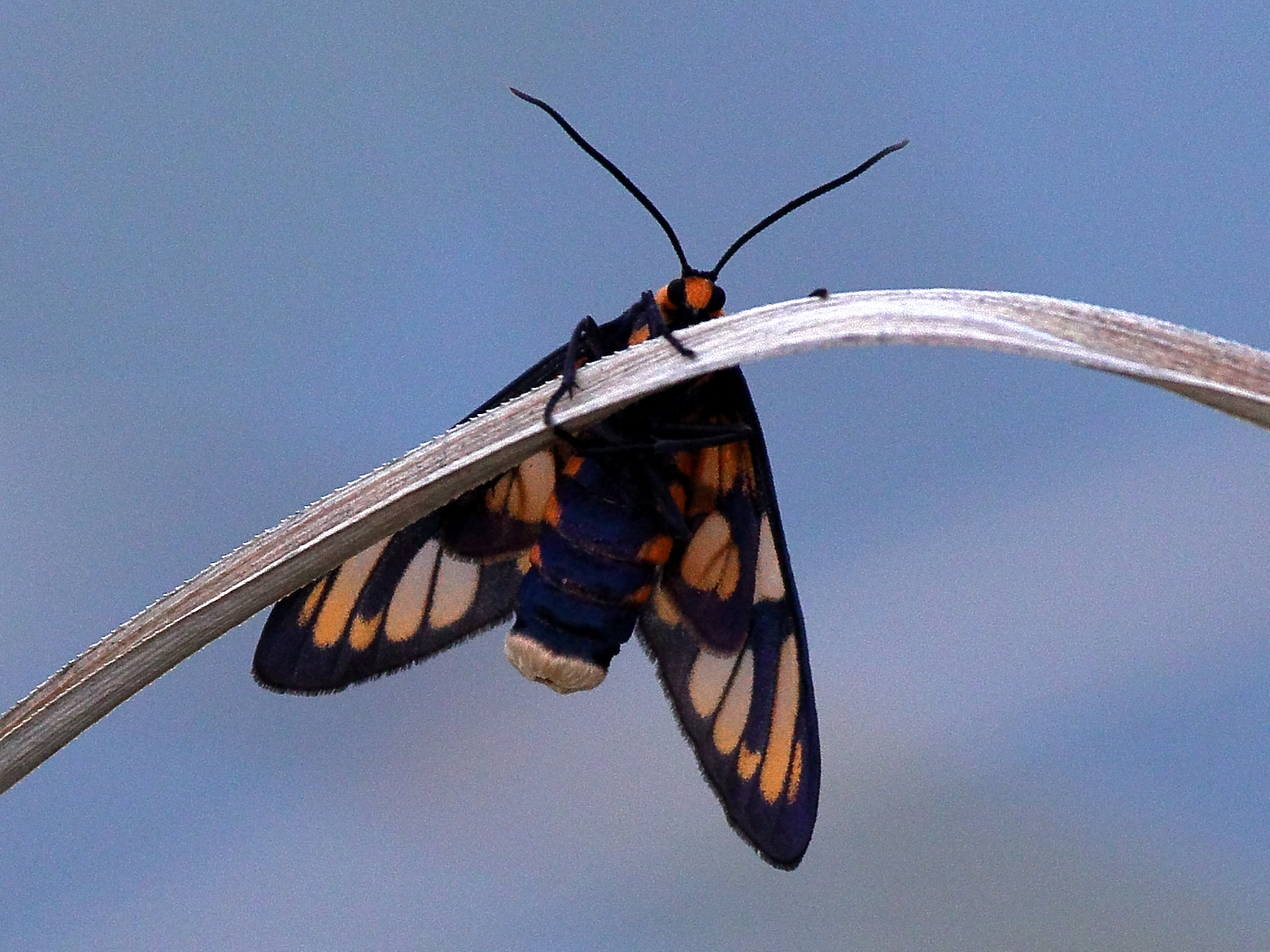
- Queensland, Australia

Scientific classification
- Kingdom: Animalia
- Phylum: Arthropoda
- Class: Insecta
- Order: Lepidoptera
- Superfamily: Noctuoidea
- Family: Erebidae
- Subfamily: Arctiinae
- Genus: Amata
- Species: A. antitheta

Binomial name
- Amata antitheta (Meyrick, 1886)

Synonyms
- Hydrusa antitheta Meyrick, 1886; Hydrusa anepsia Meyrick, 1886; Syntomis mikroplaga Seitz, 1913; Syntomis ochreipicta Seitz, 1913

= Amata antitheta =

Species of moth

Amata antitheta is a species of moth of the family Erebidae first described by Edward Meyrick in 1886. It is found in Queensland, Australia.

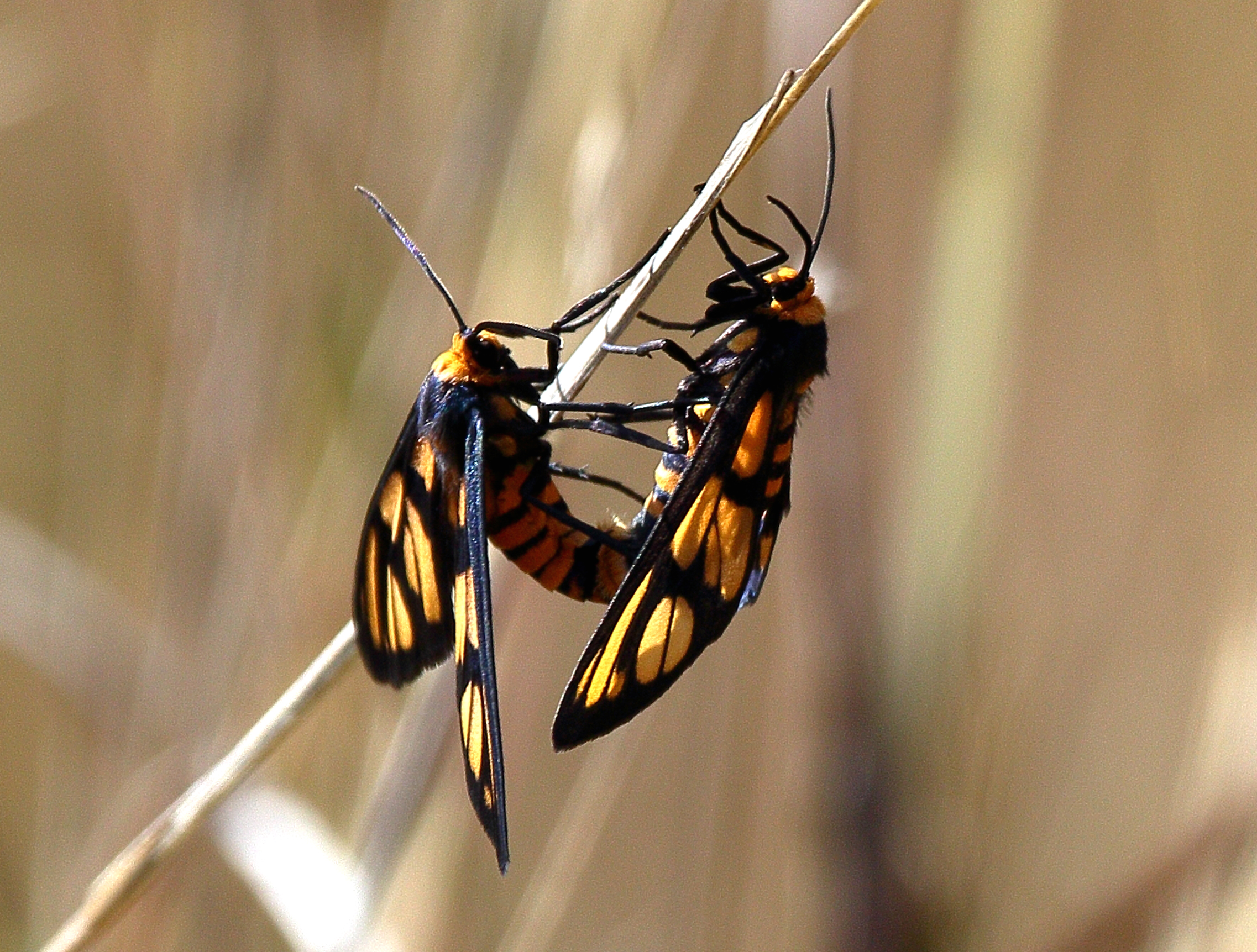
A mating pair

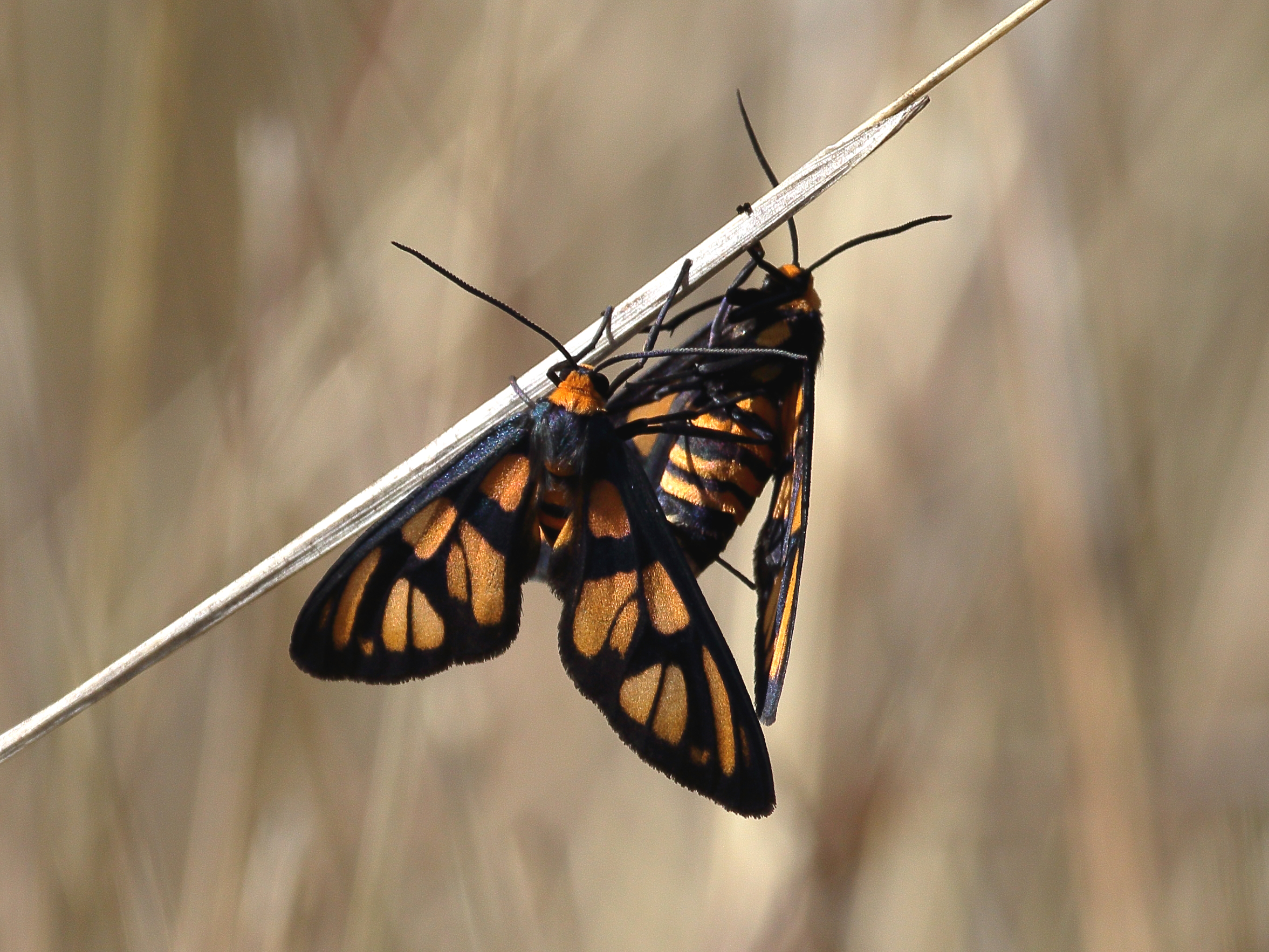
Mating pair
