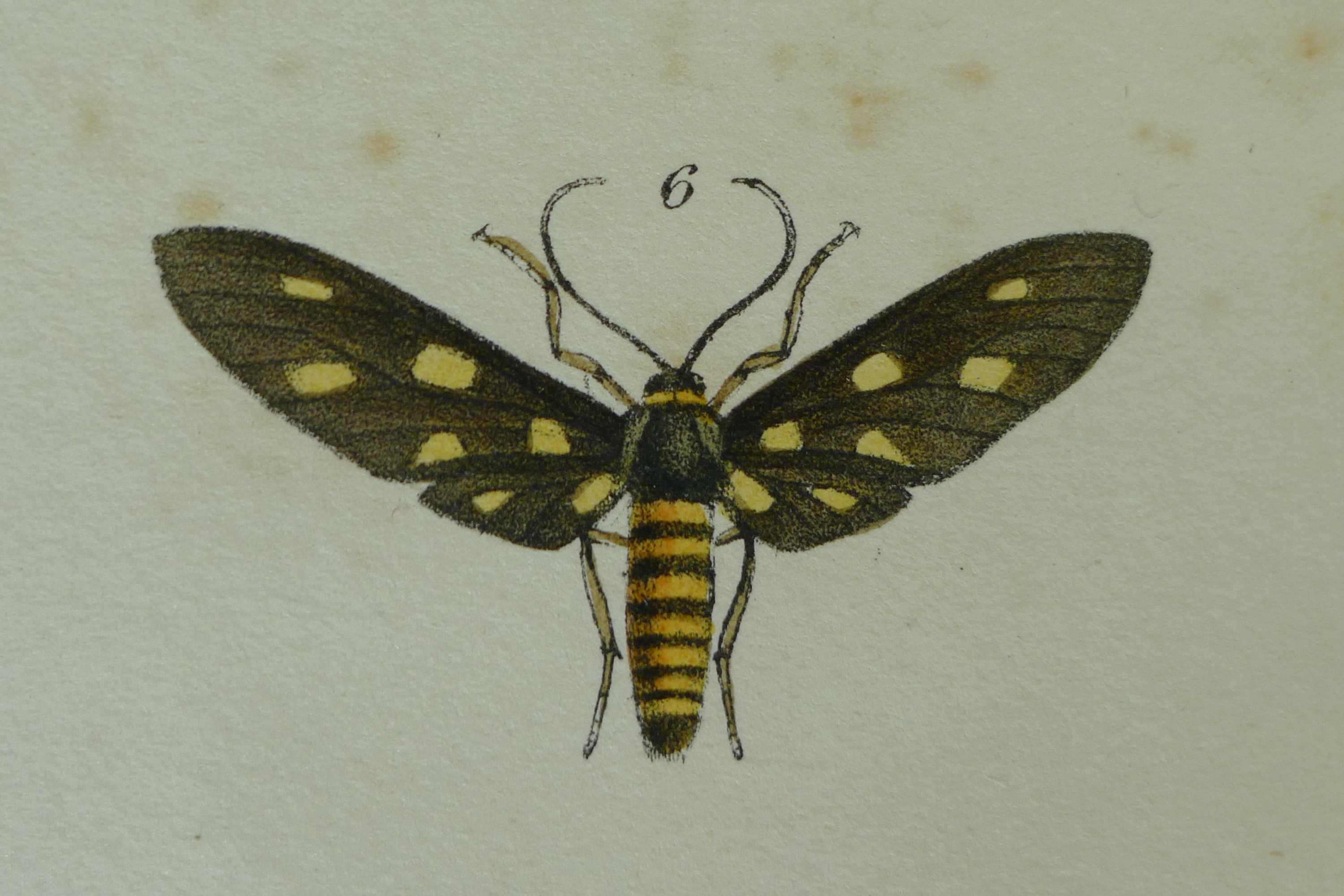

Scientific classification
- Domain: Eukaryota
- Kingdom: Animalia
- Phylum: Arthropoda
- Class: Insecta
- Order: Lepidoptera
- Superfamily: Noctuoidea
- Family: Erebidae
- Subfamily: Arctiinae
- Genus: Amata
- Species: A. wallacei

Binomial name
- Amata wallacei (Moore, 1859)

Synonyms
- Syntomis wallacei Moore, 1859

= Amata wallacei =

Species of moth

Amata wallacei is a species of moth in the family Erebidae first described by Frederic Moore in 1859. It is found on Java, Sumatra, Peninsular Malaysia and Borneo.

The length of the forewings is 15–16 mm.

== Subspecies ==
- Amata wallacei wallacei (Java)
- Amata wallacei paucicincta Holloway, 1988 (Java, Sumatra, Peninsular Malaysia, Borneo)
