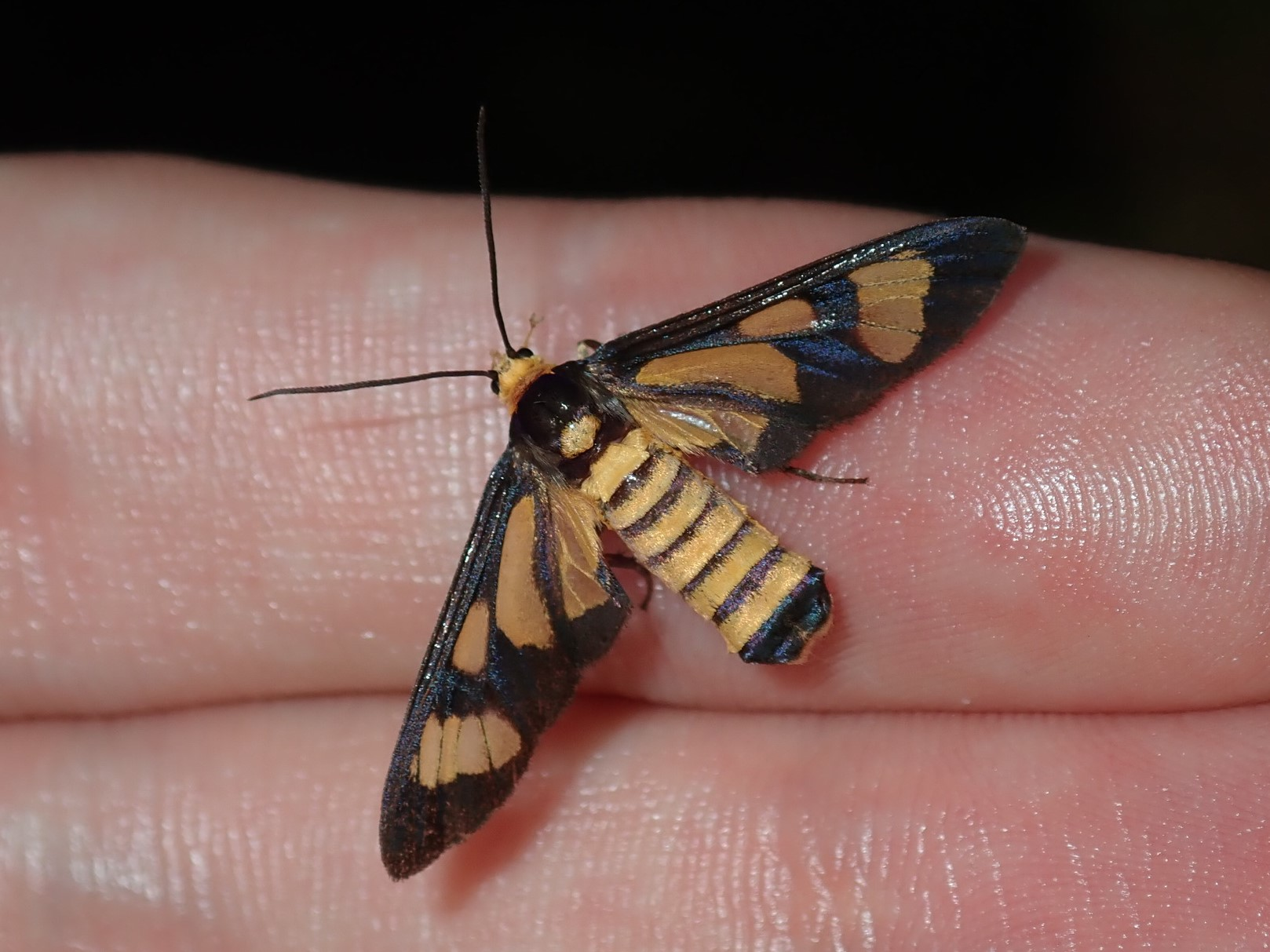

Scientific classification
- Domain: Eukaryota
- Kingdom: Animalia
- Phylum: Arthropoda
- Class: Insecta
- Order: Lepidoptera
- Superfamily: Noctuoidea
- Family: Erebidae
- Subfamily: Arctiinae
- Genus: Amata
- Species: A. lampetis

Binomial name
- Amata lampetis (Turner, 1898)

Synonyms
- Hydrusa lampetis Turner, 1898

= Amata lampetis =

Species of moth

Amata lampetis is a species of moth in the family Erebidae. It was first described by Alfred Jefferis Turner in 1898 and is found in Australia.
