= Amata decorata =

Scientific classification
- Kingdom: Animalia
- Phylum: Arthropoda
- Class: Insecta
- Order: Lepidoptera
- Superfamily: Noctuoidea
- Family: Erebidae
- Subfamily: Arctiinae
- Genus: Amata
- Species: A. decorata

Binomial name
- Amata decorata (Walker, 1862)

Synonyms
- Syntomis decorata Walker, 1862; Syntomis florina Butler, 1876; Syntomis fata Swinhoe, 1892; Ceryx decorata; Ceryx fata

Species of moth

Amata decorata is a species of moth of the family Erebidae first described by Francis Walker in 1862. It is found on Borneo. The habitat consists of lowland areas.

Adults are day-flying.
