= Amata humeralis =

Scientific classification
- Domain: Eukaryota
- Kingdom: Animalia
- Phylum: Arthropoda
- Class: Insecta
- Order: Lepidoptera
- Superfamily: Noctuoidea
- Family: Erebidae
- Subfamily: Arctiinae
- Genus: Amata
- Species: A. humeralis

Binomial name
- Amata humeralis (Butler, 1876)

Synonyms
- Hydrusa humeralis Butler, 1876

Species of moth

Amata humeralis is a species of moth of the family Erebidae first described by Arthur Gardiner Butler in 1876. It is found in Australia, where it has been recorded from Western Australia, the Northern Territory, Queensland and New South Wales.
