= Amata xanthopleura =

Scientific classification
- Kingdom: Animalia
- Phylum: Arthropoda
- Class: Insecta
- Order: Lepidoptera
- Superfamily: Noctuoidea
- Family: Erebidae
- Subfamily: Arctiinae
- Genus: Amata
- Species: A. xanthopleura

Binomial name
- Amata xanthopleura Hampson, 1914

Species of moth

Amata xanthopleura is a moth of the family Erebidae. It was described by George Hampson in 1914. It is found in Uganda.
