= Amata borneogena =

Scientific classification
- Domain: Eukaryota
- Kingdom: Animalia
- Phylum: Arthropoda
- Class: Insecta
- Order: Lepidoptera
- Superfamily: Noctuoidea
- Family: Erebidae
- Subfamily: Arctiinae
- Genus: Amata
- Species: A. borneogena

Binomial name
- Amata borneogena Obraztsov, 1955

Species of moth

Amata borneogena is a species of moth of the subfamily Arctiinae first described by Obraztsov in 1955. It is found on Borneo and the Natuna Islands.
