= Amata mjobergi =

Scientific classification
- Domain: Eukaryota
- Kingdom: Animalia
- Phylum: Arthropoda
- Class: Insecta
- Order: Lepidoptera
- Superfamily: Noctuoidea
- Family: Erebidae
- Subfamily: Arctiinae
- Genus: Amata
- Species: A. mjobergi

Binomial name
- Amata mjobergi (Talbot, 1926)

Synonyms
- Callitomis mjobergi Talbot, 1926

Species of moth

Amata mjobergi is a species of moth in the family Erebidae first described by George Talbot in 1926. It is found on Borneo.
