= Amata phaeozona =

Scientific classification
- Kingdom: Animalia
- Phylum: Arthropoda
- Class: Insecta
- Order: Lepidoptera
- Superfamily: Noctuoidea
- Family: Erebidae
- Subfamily: Arctiinae
- Genus: Amata
- Species: A. phaeozona

Binomial name
- Amata phaeozona (Zerny, 1912)

Synonyms
- Syntomis phaeozona Zerny, 1912

Species of moth

Amata phaeozona is a moth of the family Erebidae. It was described by Zerny in 1912. It is found in Tanzania.
