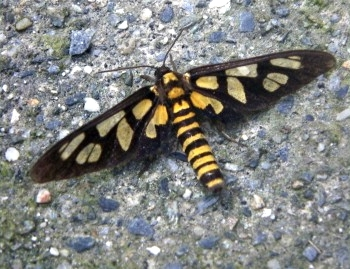

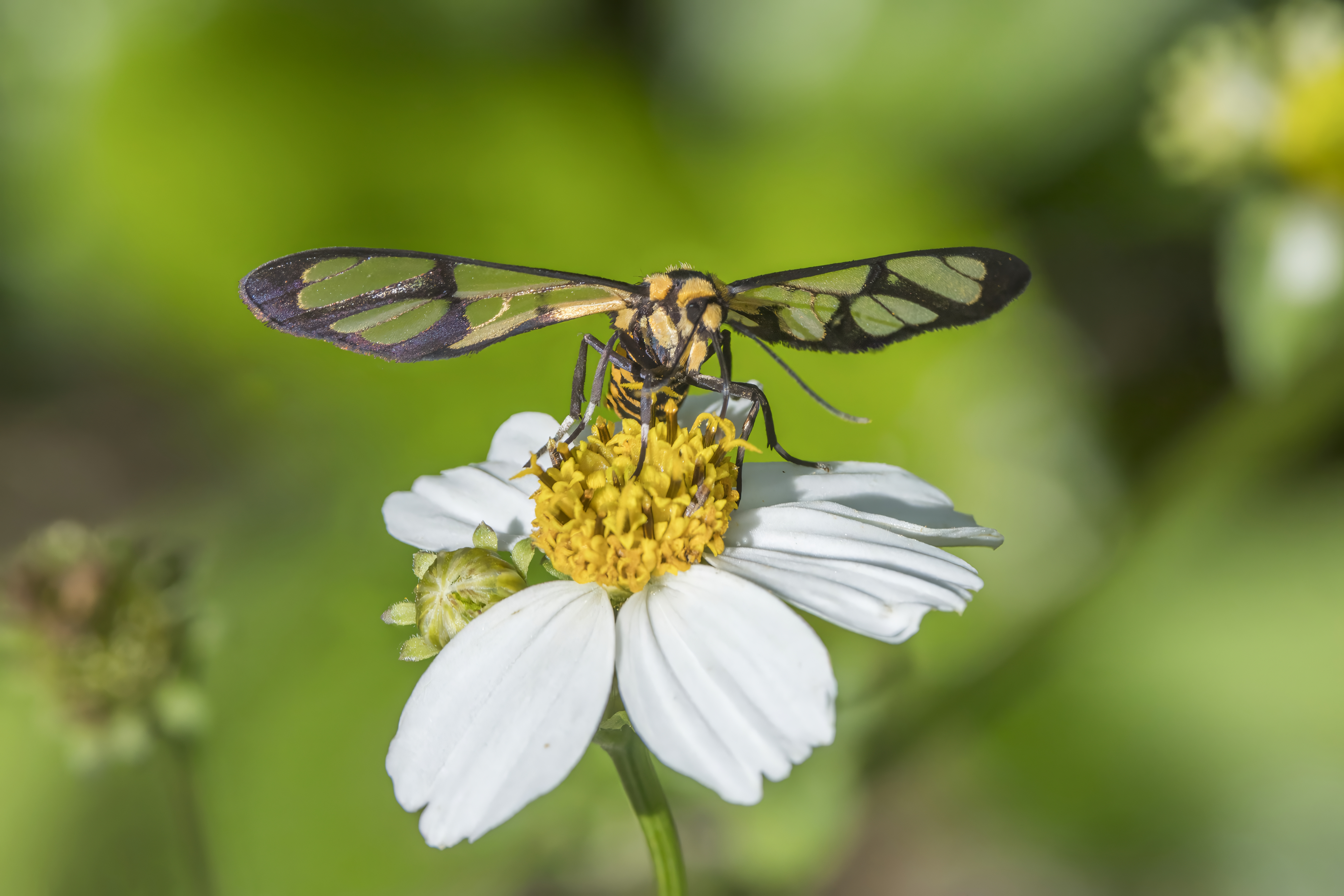
- In Taiwan

Scientific classification
- Kingdom: Animalia
- Phylum: Arthropoda
- Clade: Pancrustacea
- Class: Insecta
- Order: Lepidoptera
- Superfamily: Noctuoidea
- Family: Erebidae
- Subfamily: Arctiinae
- Genus: Amata
- Species: A. perixanthia

Binomial name
- Amata perixanthia (Hampson, 1898)

Synonyms
- Syntomis perixanthia Hampson, 1898; Syntomis perixanthia Leech, 1898; Syntomis perisimilis Leech, 1898

= Amata perixanthia =

Species of moth

Amata perixanthia is a moth of the family Erebidae first described by George Hampson in 1898. It is found in Taiwan, Tibet and eastern China.
