= Amata stanleyi =

Scientific classification
- Kingdom: Animalia
- Phylum: Arthropoda
- Class: Insecta
- Order: Lepidoptera
- Superfamily: Noctuoidea
- Family: Erebidae
- Subfamily: Arctiinae
- Genus: Amata
- Species: A. stanleyi

Binomial name
- Amata stanleyi (Kiriakoff, 1965)

Synonyms
- Syntomis stanleyi Kiriakoff, 1965

Species of moth

Amata stanleyi is a moth of the family Erebidae. It was described by Sergius G. Kiriakoff in 1965. It is found in the Democratic Republic of the Congo.
