= Amata syntomoides =

Scientific classification
- Domain: Eukaryota
- Kingdom: Animalia
- Phylum: Arthropoda
- Class: Insecta
- Order: Lepidoptera
- Superfamily: Noctuoidea
- Family: Erebidae
- Subfamily: Arctiinae
- Genus: Amata
- Species: A. syntomoides

Binomial name
- Amata syntomoides (Butler, 1876)

Synonyms
- Callitomis syntomoides Butler, 1876

Species of moth

Amata syntomoides is a moth of the subfamily Arctiinae. It was described by Arthur Gardiner Butler in 1876. It is found in Kashmir and the north-western Himalayas.
