= Amata atricornuta =

Scientific classification
- Domain: Eukaryota
- Kingdom: Animalia
- Phylum: Arthropoda
- Class: Insecta
- Order: Lepidoptera
- Superfamily: Noctuoidea
- Family: Erebidae
- Subfamily: Arctiinae
- Genus: Amata
- Species: A. atricornuta

Binomial name
- Amata atricornuta Gaede, 1926

Species of moth

Amata atricornuta is a species of moth of the family Erebidae first described by Max Gaede in 1926. It is found in Australia.
