= Amata symphona =

Scientific classification
- Domain: Eukaryota
- Kingdom: Animalia
- Phylum: Arthropoda
- Class: Insecta
- Order: Lepidoptera
- Superfamily: Noctuoidea
- Family: Erebidae
- Subfamily: Arctiinae
- Genus: Amata
- Species: A. symphona

Binomial name
- Amata symphona (C. Swinhoe, 1907)

Synonyms
- Syntomis symphona C. Swinhoe, 1907

Species of moth

Amata symphona is a species of moth of the family Erebidae first described by Charles Swinhoe in 1907. It is found on Borneo.
