= Amata multifasciata =

Scientific classification
- Kingdom: Animalia
- Phylum: Arthropoda
- Class: Insecta
- Order: Lepidoptera
- Superfamily: Noctuoidea
- Family: Erebidae
- Subfamily: Arctiinae
- Genus: Amata
- Species: A. multifasciata

Binomial name
- Amata multifasciata (Hampson, 1892)

Synonyms
- Callitomis multifasciata Hampson, 1892

Species of moth

Amata multifasciata is a moth of the subfamily Arctiinae. It was described by George Hampson in 1892. It is found in the Indian states of Sikkim and Assam.
