= Amata discata =

Scientific classification
- Kingdom: Animalia
- Phylum: Arthropoda
- Class: Insecta
- Order: Lepidoptera
- Superfamily: Noctuoidea
- Family: Erebidae
- Subfamily: Arctiinae
- Genus: Amata
- Species: A. discata

Binomial name
- Amata discata (H. Druce, 1898)

Synonyms
- Syntomis discata H. Druce, 1898; Myopsyche discata (H. Druce, 1898)

Species of moth

Amata discata is a moth of the family Erebidae. It was described by Herbert Druce in 1898. It is found in Tanzania.
