= Amata prepuncta =

Scientific classification
- Kingdom: Animalia
- Phylum: Arthropoda
- Clade: Pancrustacea
- Class: Insecta
- Order: Lepidoptera
- Superfamily: Noctuoidea
- Family: Erebidae
- Subfamily: Arctiinae
- Genus: Amata
- Species: A. prepuncta

Binomial name
- Amata prepuncta Holloway, 1988

Species of moth

Amata prepuncta is a species of moth of the family Erebidae first described by Jeremy Daniel Holloway in 1988. It is found on Borneo.
