= Amata exapta =

Scientific classification
- Domain: Eukaryota
- Kingdom: Animalia
- Phylum: Arthropoda
- Class: Insecta
- Order: Lepidoptera
- Superfamily: Noctuoidea
- Family: Erebidae
- Subfamily: Arctiinae
- Genus: Amata
- Species: A. exapta

Binomial name
- Amata exapta (C. Swinhoe, 1892)

Synonyms
- Syntomis exapta C. Swinhoe, 1892; Ceryx exapta; Amata everetti Rothschild, 1919

Species of moth

Amata exapta is a moth of the family Erebidae. It was described by Charles Swinhoe in 1892. It is found on Sumbawa, Flores, Lombok, Java and Pulo Laut.
