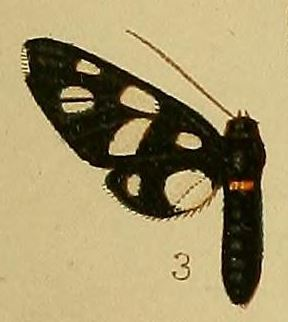

Scientific classification
- Kingdom: Animalia
- Phylum: Arthropoda
- Class: Insecta
- Order: Lepidoptera
- Superfamily: Noctuoidea
- Family: Erebidae
- Subfamily: Arctiinae
- Genus: Amata
- Species: A. croceizona

Binomial name
- Amata croceizona (Hampson, 1910)

Synonyms
- Syntomis croceizona Hampson, 1910

= Amata croceizona =

Species of moth

Amata croceizona is a moth of the subfamily Arctiinae. It was described by George Hampson in 1910. It is found in Zambia and Zimbabwe.
