= Amata nigrobasalis =

Scientific classification
- Kingdom: Animalia
- Phylum: Arthropoda
- Clade: Pancrustacea
- Class: Insecta
- Order: Lepidoptera
- Superfamily: Noctuoidea
- Family: Erebidae
- Subfamily: Arctiinae
- Genus: Amata
- Species: A. nigrobasalis

Binomial name
- Amata nigrobasalis Rothschild, 1910

Species of moth

Amata nigrobasalis is a moth of the family Erebidae. It was described by Rothschild in 1910. It is found in Ghana and Uganda.
