= Amata rufina =

Scientific classification
- Domain: Eukaryota
- Kingdom: Animalia
- Phylum: Arthropoda
- Class: Insecta
- Order: Lepidoptera
- Superfamily: Noctuoidea
- Family: Erebidae
- Subfamily: Arctiinae
- Genus: Amata
- Species: A. rufina

Binomial name
- Amata rufina (Oberthür, 1878)

Synonyms
- Syntomis rufina Oberthür, 1878

Species of moth

Amata rufina is a moth of the family Erebidae. It was described by Oberthür in 1878. It is found in Eritrea and Ethiopia.
