= Amata phaeososma =

Scientific classification
- Kingdom: Animalia
- Phylum: Arthropoda
- Class: Insecta
- Order: Lepidoptera
- Superfamily: Noctuoidea
- Family: Erebidae
- Subfamily: Arctiinae
- Genus: Amata
- Species: A. phaeososma

Binomial name
- Amata phaeososma (Hampson, 1914)

Synonyms
- Callitomis phaeososma Hampson, 1914

Species of moth

Amata phaeososma is a moth of the subfamily Arctiinae. It was described by George Hampson in 1914. It is found on Java.
