= Amata annulata =

Scientific classification
- Domain: Eukaryota
- Kingdom: Animalia
- Phylum: Arthropoda
- Class: Insecta
- Order: Lepidoptera
- Superfamily: Noctuoidea
- Family: Erebidae
- Subfamily: Arctiinae
- Genus: Amata
- Species: A. annulata

Binomial name
- Amata annulata (Fabricius, 1775)

Synonyms
- Zygaena annulata Fabricius, 1775

Species of moth

Amata annulata is a species of moth of the subfamily Arctiinae first described by Johan Christian Fabricius in 1775. It is found in Australia (Queensland, New South Wales and Victoria), New Guinea and the Philippines.

The wingspan is about 40 mm.
