= Amata vicarians =

Scientific classification
- Kingdom: Animalia
- Phylum: Arthropoda
- Clade: Pancrustacea
- Class: Insecta
- Order: Lepidoptera
- Superfamily: Noctuoidea
- Family: Erebidae
- Subfamily: Arctiinae
- Genus: Amata
- Species: A. vicarians

Binomial name
- Amata vicarians Holloway, 1988

Synonyms
- Amanta vicarians pagon Holloway, 1988

Species of moth

Amata vicarians is a species of moth of the family Erebidae first described by Jeremy Daniel Holloway in 1988. It is found on Borneo.

== Subspecies ==
- Amata vicarians vicarians
- Amata vicarians api Holloway, 1988 (Sarawak)
- Amata vicarians pagon (Holloway, 1988) (Brunei)
