= Amata cholmlei =

Scientific classification
- Kingdom: Animalia
- Phylum: Arthropoda
- Class: Insecta
- Order: Lepidoptera
- Superfamily: Noctuoidea
- Family: Erebidae
- Subfamily: Arctiinae
- Genus: Amata
- Species: A. cholmlei

Binomial name
- Amata cholmlei (Hampson, 1907)

Synonyms
- Syntomis cholmlei Hampson, 1907

Species of moth

Amata cholmlei is a moth of the subfamily Arctiinae. Described by George Hampson in 1907, it is found in Kenya.
