= Amata marella =

Scientific classification
- Domain: Eukaryota
- Kingdom: Animalia
- Phylum: Arthropoda
- Class: Insecta
- Order: Lepidoptera
- Superfamily: Noctuoidea
- Family: Erebidae
- Subfamily: Arctiinae
- Genus: Amata
- Species: A. marella

Binomial name
- Amata marella (Butler, 1876)

Synonyms
- Syntomis marella Butler, 1876; Hydrusa ecliptis Meyrick, 1886

Species of moth

Amata marella is a species of moth of the family Erebidae first described by Arthur Gardiner Butler in 1876. It is found in Australia, where it has been recorded from Queensland.
