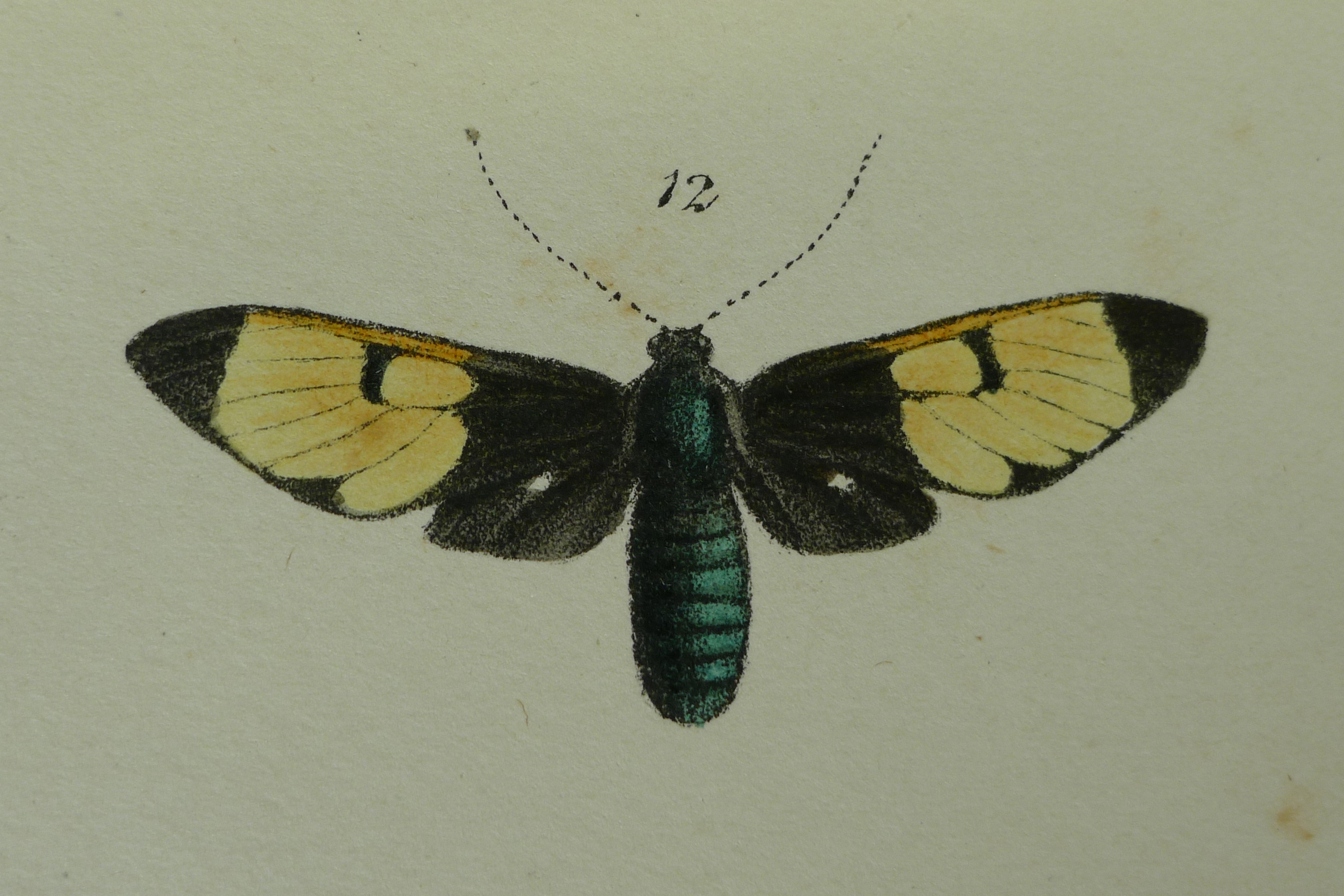

Scientific classification
- Domain: Eukaryota
- Kingdom: Animalia
- Phylum: Arthropoda
- Class: Insecta
- Order: Lepidoptera
- Superfamily: Noctuoidea
- Family: Erebidae
- Subfamily: Arctiinae
- Genus: Amata
- Species: A. cantori

Binomial name
- Amata cantori (Moore, 1859)

Synonyms
- Syntomis cantori Moore, 1859

= Amata cantori =

Species of moth

Amata cantori is a moth in the genus Amata (or Syntomis) of the subfamily Arctiinae ("woolly bears" or "tiger moths"). The species was first described by Frederic Moore in 1859. It is found on Peninsular Malaysia and Borneo.
