= Amata chroma =

Scientific classification
- Domain: Eukaryota
- Kingdom: Animalia
- Phylum: Arthropoda
- Class: Insecta
- Order: Lepidoptera
- Superfamily: Noctuoidea
- Family: Erebidae
- Subfamily: Arctiinae
- Genus: Amata
- Species: A. chroma

Binomial name
- Amata chroma (C. Swinhoe, 1892)

Synonyms
- Hydrusa chroma C. Swinhoe, 1892; Syntomis clementsi Hampson, 1901; Syntomis attenuata Hampson, 1901; Syntomis amoenaria C. Swinhoe, 1902

Species of moth

Amata chroma is a species of moth of the family Erebidae first described by Charles Swinhoe in 1892. It is found in Australia.
