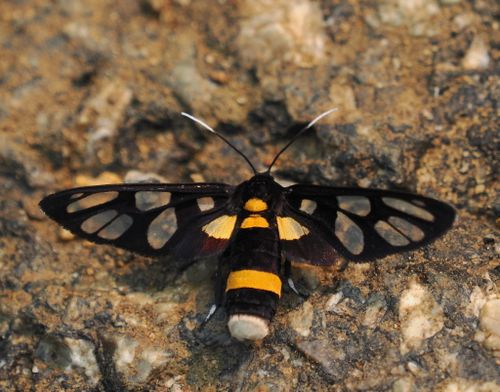

Scientific classification
- Kingdom: Animalia
- Phylum: Arthropoda
- Clade: Pancrustacea
- Class: Insecta
- Order: Lepidoptera
- Superfamily: Noctuoidea
- Family: Erebidae
- Subfamily: Arctiinae
- Genus: Amata
- Species: A. sperbius

Binomial name
- Amata sperbius Fabricius, 1787

= Amata sperbius =

Species of moth

Amata sperbius is a moth in the subfamily Arctiinae which was first described by Johan Christian Fabricius in 1787.

== Range ==
It can be found in India, Thailand, and most parts of South and Southeast Asia.
