= Amata dohertyi =

Scientific classification
- Kingdom: Animalia
- Phylum: Arthropoda
- Class: Insecta
- Order: Lepidoptera
- Superfamily: Noctuoidea
- Family: Erebidae
- Subfamily: Arctiinae
- Genus: Amata
- Species: A. dohertyi

Binomial name
- Amata dohertyi (Hampson, 1898)

Synonyms
- Callitomis dohertyi Hampson, 1898

Species of moth

Amata dohertyi is a moth of the subfamily Arctiinae. It was described by George Hampson in 1898. It is found on Java.
