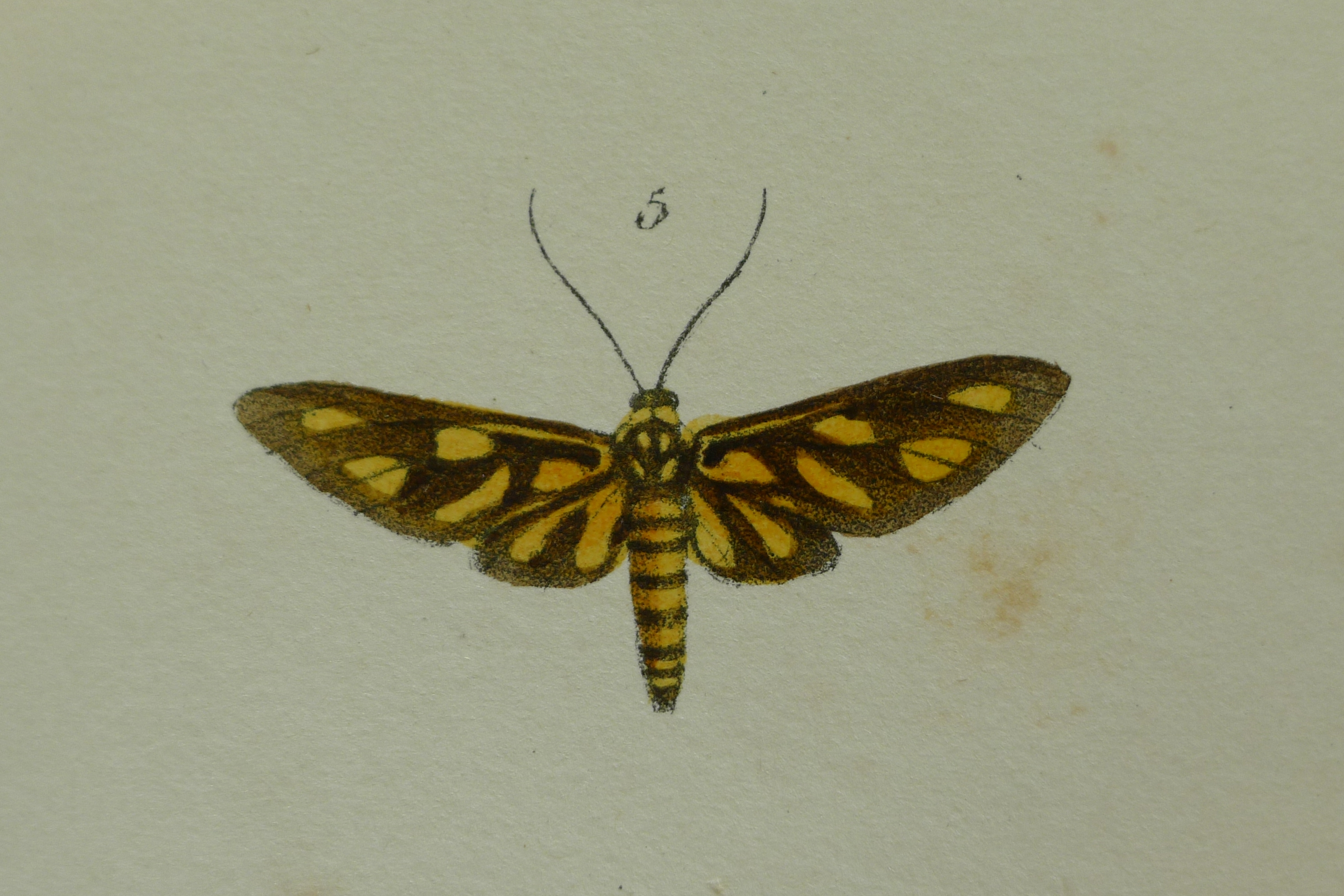

Scientific classification
- Domain: Eukaryota
- Kingdom: Animalia
- Phylum: Arthropoda
- Class: Insecta
- Order: Lepidoptera
- Superfamily: Noctuoidea
- Family: Erebidae
- Subfamily: Arctiinae
- Genus: Amata
- Species: A. pfeifferae

Binomial name
- Amata pfeifferae (Moore, 1859)

Synonyms
- Syntomis pfeifferae Moore, 1859; Zygaena pfeifferae; Syntomis acuminata Snellen, 1880

= Amata pfeifferae =

Species of moth

Amata pfeifferae is a species of moth in the family Erebidae first described by Frederic Moore in 1859. It is found on Sumatra and Java.
