= Amata ploetzi =

Scientific classification
- Domain: Eukaryota
- Kingdom: Animalia
- Phylum: Arthropoda
- Class: Insecta
- Order: Lepidoptera
- Superfamily: Noctuoidea
- Family: Erebidae
- Subfamily: Arctiinae
- Genus: Amata
- Species: A. ploetzi

Binomial name
- Amata ploetzi (Strand, 1912)

Synonyms
- Syntomis ploetzi Strand, 1912

Species of moth

Amata ploetzi is a moth of the family Erebidae. It was described by Embrik Strand in 1912. It is found in Equatorial Guinea. It is named after Carl Plötz.

The wingspan is about 33 mm (1.3 in) (holotype, a female).
