= Amata phaeobasis =

Scientific classification
- Kingdom: Animalia
- Phylum: Arthropoda
- Class: Insecta
- Order: Lepidoptera
- Superfamily: Noctuoidea
- Family: Erebidae
- Subfamily: Arctiinae
- Genus: Amata
- Species: A. phaeobasis

Binomial name
- Amata phaeobasis (Hampson, 1907)

Synonyms
- Syntomis phaeobasis Hampson, 1907

Species of moth

Amata phaeobasis is a moth of the family Erebidae. It was described by George Hampson in 1907. It is found in the Democratic Republic of the Congo and Uganda.
