= Amata luzonensis =

Scientific classification
- Domain: Eukaryota
- Kingdom: Animalia
- Phylum: Arthropoda
- Class: Insecta
- Order: Lepidoptera
- Superfamily: Noctuoidea
- Family: Erebidae
- Subfamily: Arctiinae
- Genus: Amata
- Species: A. luzonensis

Binomial name
- Amata luzonensis (Wileman & West, 1925)

Synonyms
- Callitomis luzonensis Wileman & West, 1925

Species of moth

Amata luzonensis is a moth of the subfamily Arctiinae. It was described by Wileman and West in 1925. It is found in the Philippines.
