= Amata dimorpha =

Scientific classification
- Domain: Eukaryota
- Kingdom: Animalia
- Phylum: Arthropoda
- Class: Insecta
- Order: Lepidoptera
- Superfamily: Noctuoidea
- Family: Erebidae
- Subfamily: Arctiinae
- Genus: Amata
- Species: A. dimorpha

Binomial name
- Amata dimorpha (Bytinsky-Salz, 1939)

Synonyms
- Callitomis dimorpha Bytinsky-Salz, 1939; Callitomis dimorpha f. nigerrima Bytinski-Salz, 1939

Species of moth

Amata dimorpha is a moth of the subfamily Arctiinae. It was described by Hans Bytinsky-Salz in 1939. It is found in Armenia and Turkey.
