= Amata kinensis =

Scientific classification
- Kingdom: Animalia
- Phylum: Arthropoda
- Class: Insecta
- Order: Lepidoptera
- Superfamily: Noctuoidea
- Family: Erebidae
- Subfamily: Arctiinae
- Genus: Amata
- Species: A. kinensis

Binomial name
- Amata kinensis (Hampson, 1898)

Synonyms
- Syntomis kinensis Hampson, 1898

Species of moth

Amata kinensis is a species of moth of the family Erebidae first described by George Hampson in 1898. It is found on Borneo.
