= Amata orphnaea =

Scientific classification
- Domain: Eukaryota
- Kingdom: Animalia
- Phylum: Arthropoda
- Class: Insecta
- Order: Lepidoptera
- Superfamily: Noctuoidea
- Family: Erebidae
- Subfamily: Arctiinae
- Genus: Amata
- Species: A. orphnaea

Binomial name
- Amata orphnaea (Turner, 1898)

Synonyms
- Hydrusa orphnaea Turner, 1898

Species of moth

Amata orphnaea is a species of moth of the family Erebidae first described by Alfred Jefferis Turner in 1898. It is found in Australia.
