= Amata alenicola =

Scientific classification
- Domain: Eukaryota
- Kingdom: Animalia
- Phylum: Arthropoda
- Class: Insecta
- Order: Lepidoptera
- Superfamily: Noctuoidea
- Family: Erebidae
- Subfamily: Arctiinae
- Genus: Amata
- Species: A. alenicola

Binomial name
- Amata alenicola (Strand, 1912)

Synonyms
- Syntomis alenicola Strand, 1912

Species of moth

Amata alenicola is a moth of the family Erebidae. It was described by Strand in 1912. It is found in the Democratic Republic of Congo and Equatorial Guinea.
