= Amata leucosoma =

Scientific classification
- Domain: Eukaryota
- Kingdom: Animalia
- Phylum: Arthropoda
- Class: Insecta
- Order: Lepidoptera
- Superfamily: Noctuoidea
- Family: Erebidae
- Subfamily: Arctiinae
- Genus: Amata
- Species: A. leucosoma

Binomial name
- Amata leucosoma (Butler, 1876)

Synonyms
- Callitomis leucosoma Butler, 1876

Species of moth

Amata leucosoma is a moth of the subfamily Arctiinae. It was described by Arthur Gardiner Butler in 1876. It is found in Kashmir.
