= Amata nigriceps =

Scientific classification
- Domain: Eukaryota
- Kingdom: Animalia
- Phylum: Arthropoda
- Class: Insecta
- Order: Lepidoptera
- Superfamily: Noctuoidea
- Family: Erebidae
- Subfamily: Arctiinae
- Genus: Amata
- Species: A. nigriceps

Binomial name
- Amata nigriceps (Butler, 1876)

Synonyms
- Hydrusa nigriceps Butler, 1876; Hydrusa cingulata Butler, 1876; Hydrusa intensa Butler, 1876

Species of moth

Amata nigriceps is a species of moth of the family Erebidae first described by Arthur Gardiner Butler in 1876. It is found in Australia, where it has been recorded from Queensland and New South Wales.
