= Amata melitospila =

Scientific classification
- Domain: Eukaryota
- Kingdom: Animalia
- Phylum: Arthropoda
- Class: Insecta
- Order: Lepidoptera
- Superfamily: Noctuoidea
- Family: Erebidae
- Subfamily: Arctiinae
- Genus: Amata
- Species: A. melitospila

Binomial name
- Amata melitospila (Turner, 1905)

Synonyms
- Syntomis melitospila Turner, 1905

Species of moth

Amata melitospila is a species of moth of the family Erebidae first described by Alfred Jefferis Turner in 1905. It is found in Australia, where it has been recorded from Queensland.

The wingspan is about 35 mm.
