= Amata recedens =

Scientific classification
- Domain: Eukaryota
- Kingdom: Animalia
- Phylum: Arthropoda
- Class: Insecta
- Order: Lepidoptera
- Superfamily: Noctuoidea
- Family: Erebidae
- Subfamily: Arctiinae
- Genus: Amata
- Species: A. recedens

Binomial name
- Amata recedens (H. Lucas, 1891)

Synonyms
- Hydrusa recedens H. Lucas, 1891

Species of moth

Amata recedens is a species of moth of the family Erebidae first described by Hippolyte Lucas in 1891. It is found in Australia.
