= Amata rendalli =

Scientific classification
- Domain: Eukaryota
- Kingdom: Animalia
- Phylum: Arthropoda
- Class: Insecta
- Order: Lepidoptera
- Superfamily: Noctuoidea
- Family: Erebidae
- Subfamily: Arctiinae
- Genus: Amata
- Species: A. rendalli

Binomial name
- Amata rendalli (Distant, 1897)

Synonyms
- Syntomis rendalli Distant, 1897

Species of moth

Amata rendalli is a moth of the family Erebidae. It was described by William Lucas Distant in 1897. It is found in South Africa.
