= Amata leucacma =

Scientific classification
- Kingdom: Animalia
- Phylum: Arthropoda
- Class: Insecta
- Order: Lepidoptera
- Superfamily: Noctuoidea
- Family: Erebidae
- Subfamily: Arctiinae
- Genus: Amata
- Species: A. leucacma

Binomial name
- Amata leucacma (Meyrick, 1886)

Synonyms
- Hydrusa leucacma Meyrick, 1886

Species of moth

Amata leucacma is a species of moth of the family Erebidae first described by Edward Meyrick in 1886. It is found in Queensland, Australia.
