= Amata shirakii =

Scientific classification
- Domain: Eukaryota
- Kingdom: Animalia
- Phylum: Arthropoda
- Class: Insecta
- Order: Lepidoptera
- Superfamily: Noctuoidea
- Family: Erebidae
- Subfamily: Arctiinae
- Genus: Amata
- Species: A. shirakii

Binomial name
- Amata shirakii (Sonan, 1941)

Synonyms
- Callitomis shirakii Sonan, 1941

Species of moth

Amata shirakii is a moth of the subfamily Arctiinae. It was described by Jinhaku Sonan in 1941. It is found in Taiwan.
