= Amata flavoanalis =

Scientific classification
- Kingdom: Animalia
- Phylum: Arthropoda
- Class: Insecta
- Order: Lepidoptera
- Superfamily: Noctuoidea
- Family: Erebidae
- Subfamily: Arctiinae
- Genus: Amata
- Species: A. flavoanalis

Binomial name
- Amata flavoanalis (Seitz, 1926)

Synonyms
- Syntomis flavoanalis Seitz, 1926

Species of moth

Amata flavoanalis is a moth of the family Erebidae. It was described by Seitz in 1926. It is found in Cameroon.
