= Amata caerulescens =

Scientific classification
- Domain: Eukaryota
- Kingdom: Animalia
- Phylum: Arthropoda
- Class: Insecta
- Order: Lepidoptera
- Superfamily: Noctuoidea
- Family: Erebidae
- Subfamily: Arctiinae
- Genus: Amata
- Species: A. caerulescens

Binomial name
- Amata caerulescens (H. Druce, 1898)

Synonyms
- Syntomis caerulescens H. Druce, 1898

Species of moth

Amata caerulescens is a moth of the subfamily Arctiinae. It was described by Herbert Druce in 1898. It is found in Mozambique.
