= List of moths of Australia (Arctiinae) =

Partial list of Australian moths

This is a list of the Australian species of the subfamily Arctiinae. It also acts as an index to the species articles and forms part of the full List of moths of Australia.

== Tribe Arctiini ==
- Aloa costalis Walker, 1865
- Aloa gangara Swinhoe, 1892
- Aloa marginata (Donovan, 1805)
- Amerila alberti (Rothschild, 1910)
- Amerila crokeri (W.S. Macleay, 1826)
- Amerila nigropunctata (Bethune-Baker, 1908)
- Amerila rubripes Walker, 1865
- Amerila serica Meyrick, 1886
- Amerila simillima (Rothschild, 1917)
- Amerila timolis (Rothschild, 1914)
- Argina astraea (Drury, 1773)
- Cheliosea cosmeta (Lower, 1907)
- Creatonotos gangis (Linnaeus, 1763)
- Nyctemera amicus (White, 1841)
- Nyctemera baulus (Boisduval, 1832)
- Nyctemera luctuosa (Vollenhoven, 1863)
- Nyctemera secundiana T.P. Lucas, 1891
- Paralacydes maculifascia (Walker, 1855)
- Phaos aglaophara Turner, 1926
- Phaos interfixa Walker, 1855
- Spilosoma canescens (Butler, 1875)
- Spilosoma curvata (Donovan, 1805)
- Spilosoma erythrastis Meyrick, 1886
- Spilosoma glatignyi (Le Guillou, 1841)
- Spilosoma nobilis Turner, 1940
- Tyria jacobaeae (Linnaeus, 1758)
- Utetheisa aegrotum (Swinhoe, 1892)
- Utetheisa lotrix (Cramer, 1777)
- Utetheisa pectinata Hampson, 1907
- Utetheisa pellex (Linnaeus, 1758)
- Utetheisa pulchelloides Hampson, 1907

=== Subtribe Euchromiina ===
- Euchromia aemulina Butler, 1877
- Euchromia creusa (Linnaeus, 1758)
- Euchromia lurlina Butler, 1888
- Euchromia polymena (Linnaeus, 1758)

== Tribe Syntomini ==
- Amata annulata (Fabricius, 1775)
- Amata antitheta (Meyrick, 1886)
- Amata aperta (Walker, 1865)
- Amata atricornuta Gaede, 1926
- Amata bicolor (Walker, 1854)
- Amata chlorometis (Meyrick, 1886)
- Amata choneutospila (Turner, 1905)
- Amata chroma (Swinhoe, 1892)
- Amata chromatica (Turner, 1905)
- Amata cyanura (Meyrick, 1886)
- Amata dyschlaena (Turner, 1905)
- Amata heptaspila (Turner, 1905)
- Amata hesperitis (Meyrick, 1886)
- Amata huebneri (Boisduval, 1828)
- Amata humeralis (Butler, 1876)
- Amata hyalota (Meyrick, 1886)
- Amata insularis (Butler, 1876)
- Amata lampetis (Turner, 1898)
- Amata leucacma (Meyrick, 1886)
- Amata lucta (T.P. Lucas, 1901)
- Amata macroplaca (Meyrick, 1886)
- Amata magistri (Turner, 1905)
- Amata marella (Butler, 1876)
- Amata melitospila (Turner, 1905)
- Amata nigriceps (Butler, 1876)
- Amata ochrospila (Turner, 1922)
- Amata olinda (Swinhoe, 1892)
- Amata orphnaea (Turner, 1898)
- Amata pactolina (Walker, 1865)
- Amata paradelpha (Turner, 1905)
- Amata paraula (Meyrick, 1886)
- Amata phaeochyta (Turner, 1907)
- Amata phepsalotis (Meyrick, 1886)
- Amata prosomoea (Turner, 1905)
- Amata pyrocoma (Meyrick, 1886)
- Amata recedens (T.P. Lucas, 1891)
- Amata trigonophora (Turner, 1898)
- Amata xanthosoma (Turner, 1898)
- Amata xanthura (Turner, 1905)
- Ceryx guttulosa (Walker, 1865)
- Ceryx sphenodes (Meyrick, 1886)
- Eressa angustipenna (T.P. Lucas, 1890)
- Eressa geographica (Meyrick, 1886)
- Eressa megalospilia Turner, 1922
- Eressa megatorna Hampson, 1898
- Eressa paurospila Turner, 1922
- Eressa rhysoptila (Turner, 1922)
- Eressa strepsimeris (Meyrick, 1886)

== Tribe Lithosiini ==
- Aedoea decreta (Butler, 1877)
- Ameleta panochra Turner, 1940
- Anestia ombrophanes Meyrick, 1886
- Anestia semiochrea (Butler, 1886)
- Arrhythmica semifusca Turner, 1940
- Asura bipars (Walker, 1865)
- Asura catameces Turner, 1940
- Asura cervicalis Walker, 1854
- Asura coccinocosma Turner, 1940
- Asura compsodes Turner, 1940
- Asura crocopepla Turner, 1940
- Asura crocoptera Turner, 1940
- Asura lydia (Donovan, 1805)
- Asura monospila Turner, 1940
- Asura obliterans Draudt, 1914
- Asura polyspila Turner, 1940
- Asura semivitrea (Rothschild, 1913)
- Asura zebrina (Hampson, 1914)
- Atelophleps tridesma Turner, 1940
- Ateucheta zatesima (Hampson, 1914)
- Calamidia hirta (Walker, 1854)
- Castulo doubledayi Newman, 1857
- Castulo plagiata Walker, 1854
- Chamaita barnardi (T.P. Lucas, 1894)
- Chrysomesia lophoptera (Turner, 1940)
- Chrysoscota tanyphara Turner, 1940
- Ctenosia infuscata Lower, 1902
- Cyana asticta (Hampson, 1909)
- Cyana meyricki (Rothschild, 1901)
- Cyana obscura (Hampson, 1900)
- Damias catarrhoa (Meyrick, 1886)
- Damias elegans Boisduval, 1832
- Damias leptosema (Turner, 1940)
- Damias pelochroa (Hampson, 1914)
- Damias procrena (Meyrick, 1886)
- Damias scripta (Lower, 1902)
- Damias sicciodes (Hampson, 1914)
- Diduga flavicostata (Snellen, 1878)
- Eilema plana (Boisduval, 1832)
- Eilema pseudoluteola Strand, 1922
- Eutane terminalis Walker, 1854
- Eutane trimochla Turner, 1940
- Goniosema anguliscripta (T.P. Lucas, 1890)
- Goniosema euraphota Turner, 1940
- Graphosia lophopyga (Turner, 1940)
- Graphosia stenopepla Hampson, 1914
- Gymnasura flavia (Hampson, 1900)
- Gymnasura prionosticha (Turner, 1940)
- Gymnasura saginaea (Turner, 1899)
- Halone consolatrix (Rosenstock, 1885)
- Halone coryphoea Hampson, 1914
- Halone ebaea Hampson, 1914
- Halone epiopsis Turner, 1940
- Halone interspersa (T.P. Lucas, 1890)
- Halone ophiodes (Meyrick, 1886)
- Halone prosenes Turner, 1940
- Halone pteridaula (Turner, 1922)
- Halone sejuncta (R. Felder & Rogenhofer, 1875)
- Halone servilis (Meyrick, 1886)
- Halone sinuata (Wallengren, 1860)
- Halone sobria Walker, 1854
- Hectobrocha adoxa (Meyrick, 1886)
- Hectobrocha multilinea T.P. Lucas, 1890
- Hectobrocha pentacyma Meyrick, 1886
- Hectobrocha subnigra T.P. Lucas, 1890
- Heliosia charopa Turner, 1904
- Heliosia jucunda (Walker, 1854)
- Heliosia micra Hampson, 1903
- Heliosia perichares Turner, 1944
- Hemonia micrommata (Turner, 1899)
- Hemonia pallida Hampson, 1914
- Hemonia simillima Rothschild, 1913
- Hestiarcha pyrrhopa Meyrick, 1886
- Hesychopa chionora (Meyrick, 1886)
- Hesychopa molybdica Turner, 1940
- Heterallactis euchrysa Meyrick, 1886
- Heterallactis microchrysa Turner, 1940
- Heterallactis niphocephala Turner, 1940
- Heterallactis phlogozona (Turner, 1904)
- Heterallactis stenochrysa Turner, 1940
- Heterallactis trigonochrysa Turner, 1940
- Heterotropa fastosa Turner, 1940
- Hobapromea cleta (Turner, 1940)
- Hyposhada pellopis (Bethune-Baker, 1908)
- Ionthas ataracta Hampson, 1914
- Ionthas thirkelli (Fraser, 1961)
- Lambula obliquilinea Hampson, 1900
- Lambula phyllodes (Meyrick, 1886)
- Lambula pleuroptycha Turner, 1940
- Lambula pristina (Walker, 1866)
- Lambula transcripta (T.P. Lucas, 1890)
- Lepista pulverulenta (T.P. Lucas, 1890)
- Lyclene pyraula (Meyrick, 1886)
- Lyclene quadrilineata (Pagenstecher, 1886)
- Lyclene reticulata (C. Felder, 1861)
- Lyclene serratilinea (Turner, 1940)
- Lyclene structa (Walker, 1854)
- Macaduma pallicosta Rothschild, 1912
- Macaduma strongyla Turner, 1922
- Macaduma toxophora (Turner, 1899)
- Manulea dorsalis (Walker, 1866)
- Manulea replana (Lewin, 1805)
- Melastrota nigrisquamata (Swinhoe, 1901)
- Meteura cervina (T.P. Lucas, 1890)
- Microstola ammoscia Lower, 1920
- Notata modicus (T.P. Lucas, 1892)
- Oeonistis altica (Linnaeus, 1768)
- Oreopola athola Turner, 1940
- Padenodes cuprizona (Hampson, 1914)
- Palaeosia bicosta (Walker, 1854)
- Panachranta lirioleuca Turner, 1922
- Parascaptia biplagata Bethune-Baker, 1908
- Parascaptia dochmoschema (Turner, 1940)
- Parelictis saleuta Meyrick, 1886
- Phaeophlebosia furcifera (Walker, 1854)
- Phenacomorpha bisecta (T.P. Lucas, 1891)
- Philenora aspectalella (Walker, 1864)
- Philenora cataplex Turner, 1940
- Philenora chionastis (Meyrick, 1886)
- Philenora elegans (Butler, 1877)
- Philenora irregularis (T.P. Lucas, 1890)
- Philenora lunata (T.P. Lucas, 1890)
- Philenora malthaca Turner, 1944
- Philenora nudaridia Hampson, 1900
- Philenora omophanes (Meyrick, 1886)
- Philenora placochrysa (Turner, 1899)
- Philenora pteridopola Turner, 1922
- Philenora undulosa (Walker, 1858)
- Poliodule melanotricha Turner, 1941
- Poliodule poliotricha Turner, 1940
- Poliodule xanthodelta (Lower, 1897)
- Poliosia fragilis (T.P. Lucas, 1890)
- Pseudophanes melanoptera Turner, 1940
- Psilopepla mollis (T.P. Lucas, 1894)
- Scaphidriotis camptopleura (Turner, 1940)
- Scaphidriotis xylogramma Turner, 1899
- Scaptesyle dichotoma (Meyrick, 1886)
- Scaptesyle dictyota (Meyrick, 1886)
- Scaptesyle equidistans (T.P. Lucas, 1890)
- Scaptesyle middletoni (Turner, 1941)
- Scaptesyle monogrammaria (Walker, 1863)
- Scaptesyle tetramita Turner, 1940
- Schistophleps albida (Walker, 1865)
- Schistophleps obducta (T.P. Lucas, 1894)
- Scoliacma adrasta (Turner, 1940)
- Scoliacma bicolora (Boisduval, 1832)
- Scoliacma fasciata (Aurivillius, 1920)
- Scoliacma nana (Walker, 1854)
- Scoliacma pactolias Meyrick, 1886
- Scoliacma pasteophara Turner, 1940
- Scoliacma xuthopis Hampson, 1914
- Stenarcha stenopa (Meyrick, 1886)
- Stenoscaptia venusta (T.P. Lucas, 1890)
- Symmetrodes platymelas Turner, 1940
- Symmetrodes sciocosma Meyrick, 1888
- Teratopora acosma (Turner, 1899)
- Termessa catocalina (Walker, 1865)
- Termessa congrua (Walker, 1865)
- Termessa conographa (Meyrick, 1886)
- Termessa diplographa Turner, 1899
- Termessa discrepans (Walker, 1865)
- Termessa gratiosa (Walker, 1865)
- Termessa laeta (Walker, 1856)
- Termessa nivosa (Walker, 1865)
- Termessa orthocrossa Turner, 1922
- Termessa shepherdi Newman, 1856
- Termessa xanthomelas (Lower, 1892)
- Termessa zonophanes (Meyrick, 1888)
- Teulisna bipunctata (Walker, 1866)
- Teulisna chiloides Walker, 1862
- Thallarcha albicollis (R. Felder & Rogenhofer, 1875)
- Thallarcha catasticta Lower, 1915
- Thallarcha chrysochares Meyrick, 1886
- Thallarcha chrysochoa (Meyrick, 1886)
- Thallarcha cosmodes Turner, 1940
- Thallarcha epicela Turner, 1922
- Thallarcha epigypsa (Lower, 1902)
- Thallarcha epileuca Turner, 1922
- Thallarcha epiostola Turner, 1926
- Thallarcha eremicola Pescott, 1951
- Thallarcha erotis Turner, 1914
- Thallarcha fusa Hampson, 1900
- Thallarcha homoschema Turner, 1940
- Thallarcha isophragma (Meyrick, 1886)
- Thallarcha jocularis (Rosenstock, 1885)
- Thallarcha lechrioleuca Turner, 1940
- Thallarcha leptographa Turner, 1899
- Thallarcha levis Turner, 1943
- Thallarcha lochaga (Meyrick, 1886)
- Thallarcha macilenta (T.P. Lucas, 1894)
- Thallarcha mochlina (Turner, 1899)
- Thallarcha oblita (R. Felder & Rogenhofer, 1875)
- Thallarcha partita (Walker, 1869)
- Thallarcha pellax Turner, 1940
- Thallarcha phalarota Meyrick, 1886
- Thallarcha polystigma Turner, 1943
- Thallarcha rhaptophora Lower, 1915
- Thallarcha sparsana (Walker, 1863)
- Thallarcha staurocola (Meyrick, 1886)
- Thallarcha stramenticolor Turner, 1940
- Thallarcha trissomochla Turner, 1940
- Thallarcha zophophanes Turner, 1940
- Thermeola tasmanica Hampson, 1900
- Threnosia agraphes Turner, 1940
- Threnosia heminephes (Meyrick, 1886)
- Threnosia hypopolia Turner, 1940
- Threnosia myochroa Turner, 1940
- Thumatha fuscescens Walker, 1866
- Tigrioides alterna (Walker, 1854)
- Tigrioides nitens (Walker, 1865)
- Trischalis aureoplagiata (Rothschild, 1913)
- Trissobrocha eugraphica Turner, 1914
- Tylanthes ptochias Meyrick, 1889
