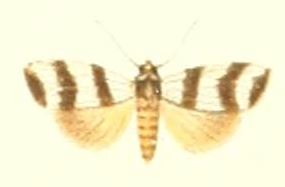
- Eutane triplagata

Scientific classification
- Kingdom: Animalia
- Phylum: Arthropoda
- Class: Insecta
- Order: Lepidoptera
- Superfamily: Noctuoidea
- Family: Erebidae
- Subfamily: Arctiinae
- Tribe: Lithosiini
- Genus: Eutane; Walker, 1854

= Eutane =

Genus of moths

Eutane is a genus of moths in the subfamily Arctiinae. The genus was erected by Francis Walker in 1854.

== Species ==
- Eutane alba Hampson, 1900 (Borneo)
- Eutane nivea Hampson, 1905 (Borneo)
- Eutane terminalis Walker, 1854 (Australia)
- Eutane trimochla Turner, 1940 (Australia)
- Eutane triplagata Pagenstecher, 1900 (Papua New Guinea)
