= Scaphidriotis =

Scientific classification
- Domain: Eukaryota
- Kingdom: Animalia
- Phylum: Arthropoda
- Class: Insecta
- Order: Lepidoptera
- Superfamily: Noctuoidea
- Family: Erebidae
- Subfamily: Arctiinae
- Tribe: Lithosiini
- Genus: Scaphidriotis; Turner, 1899

Genus of moths

Scaphidriotis is a genus of moths in the subfamily Arctiinae.

== Species ==
- Scaphidriotis camptopleura (Turner, 1940)
- Scaphidriotis xylogramma Turner, 1899
