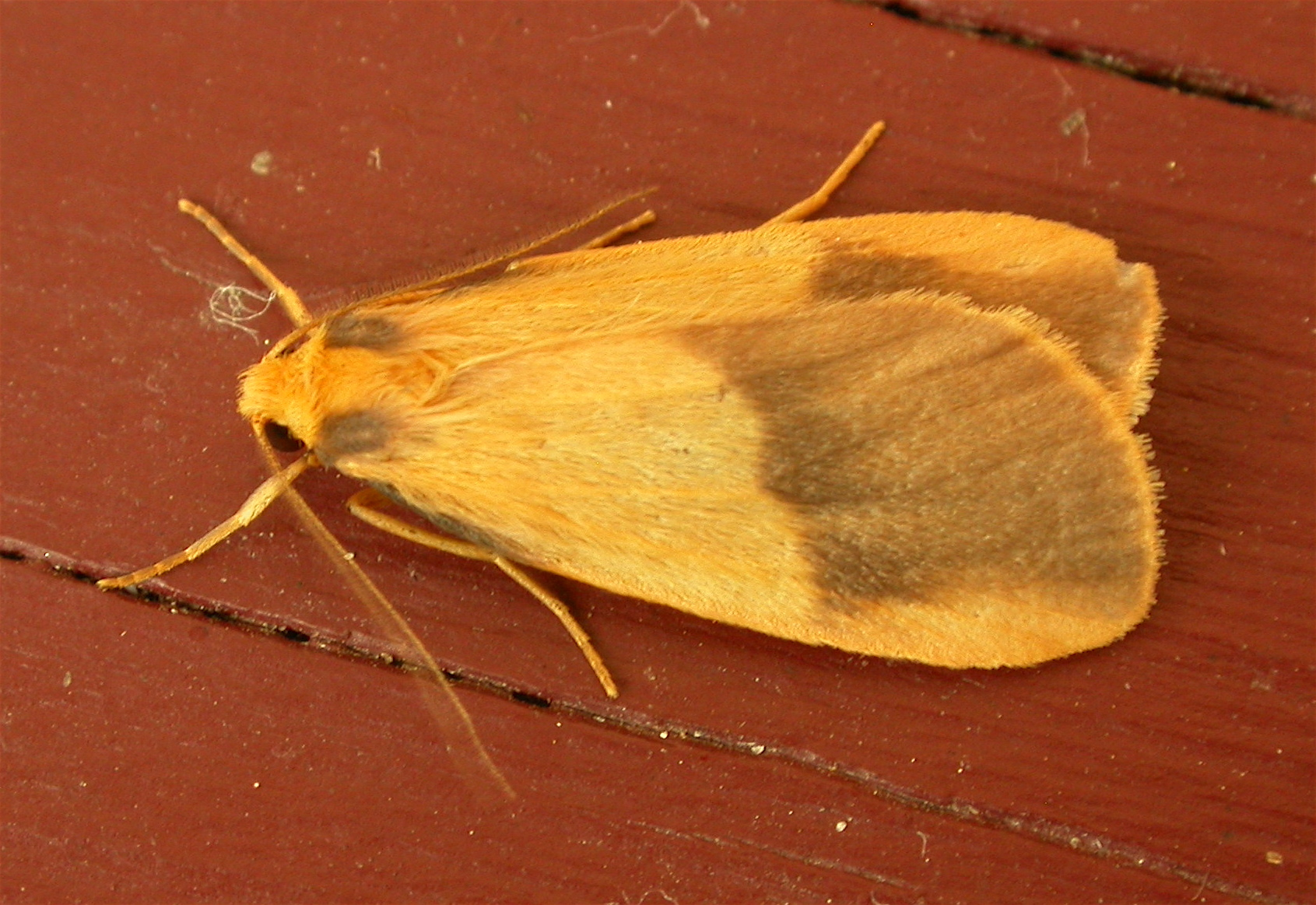
- Threnosia heminephes

Scientific classification
- Kingdom: Animalia
- Phylum: Arthropoda
- Class: Insecta
- Order: Lepidoptera
- Superfamily: Noctuoidea
- Family: Erebidae
- Subfamily: Arctiinae
- Tribe: Lithosiini
- Genus: Threnosia; Hampson, 1900

= Threnosia =

Genus of moths

Threnosia is a genus of moths in the subfamily Arctiinae.

== Species ==
- Threnosia agraphes Turner, 1940
- Threnosia heminephes Meyrick, 1886
- Threnosia hypopolia Turner, 1940
- Threnosia myochroa Turner, 1940

== Former species ==
- Threnosia adrasta Turner, 1940
