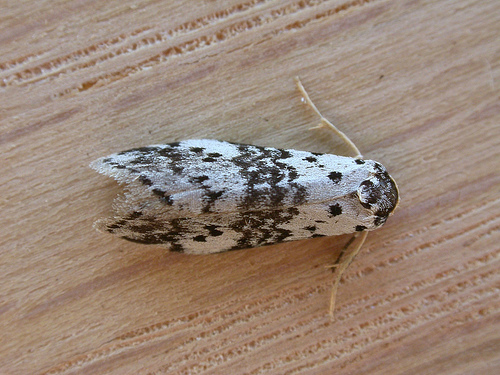
- Thallarcha fusa

Scientific classification
- Kingdom: Animalia
- Phylum: Arthropoda
- Class: Insecta
- Order: Lepidoptera
- Superfamily: Noctuoidea
- Family: Erebidae
- Subfamily: Arctiinae
- Tribe: Lithosiini
- Genus: Thallarcha; Meyrick, 1886

Synonyms
- Comarchis Meyrick, 1886

= Thallarcha =

Genus of moths

Thallarcha is a genus of moths in the subfamily Arctiinae.

== Species ==
- Thallarcha albicollis (R. Felder & Rogenhofer, 1875)
- Thallarcha catasticta Lower, 1915
- Thallarcha chrysochares Meyrick, 1886
- Thallarcha chrysochoa (Meyrick, 1886)
- Thallarcha cosmodes Turner, 1940
- Thallarcha epicela Turner, 1922
- Thallarcha epigypsa (Lower, 1902)
- Thallarcha epileuca Turner, 1922
- Thallarcha epiostola Turner, 1926
- Thallarcha eremicola Pescott, 1951
- Thallarcha erotis Turner, 1914
- Thallarcha fusa Hampson, 1900
- Thallarcha homoschema Turner, 1940
- Thallarcha isophragma (Meyrick, 1886)
- Thallarcha jocularis (Rosenstock, 1885)
- Thallarcha lechrioleuca Turner, 1940
- Thallarcha leptographa Turner, 1899
- Thallarcha levis Turner, 1943
- Thallarcha lochaga (Meyrick, 1886)
- Thallarcha macilenta (T.P. Lucas, 1894)
- Thallarcha mochlina (Turner, 1899)
- Thallarcha oblita (R. Felder & Rogenhofer, 1875)
- Thallarcha partita (Walker, 1869)
- Thallarcha pellax Turner, 1940
- Thallarcha phalarota Meyrick, 1886
- Thallarcha polystigma Turner, 1943
- Thallarcha rhaptophora Lower, 1915
- Thallarcha sparsana (Walker, 1863)
- Thallarcha staurocola (Meyrick, 1886)
- Thallarcha stramenticolor Turner, 1940
- Thallarcha trissomochla Turner, 1940
- Thallarcha zophophanes Turner, 1940
