= Goniosema =

Scientific classification
- Domain: Eukaryota
- Kingdom: Animalia
- Phylum: Arthropoda
- Class: Insecta
- Order: Lepidoptera
- Superfamily: Noctuoidea
- Family: Erebidae
- Subfamily: Arctiinae
- Tribe: Lithosiini
- Genus: Goniosema; Turner, 1899

Genus of moths

Goniosema is a genus of moths in the subfamily Arctiinae. The genus was described by Turner in 1899.

== Species ==
- Goniosema anguliscripta (Lucas, 1890)
- Goniosema euraphota Turner, 1940
