= Trischalis iridescens =

Scientific classification
- Domain: Eukaryota
- Kingdom: Animalia
- Phylum: Arthropoda
- Class: Insecta
- Order: Lepidoptera
- Superfamily: Noctuoidea
- Family: Erebidae
- Subfamily: Arctiinae
- Genus: Trischalis
- Species: T. iridescens

Binomial name
- Trischalis iridescens Rothschild, 1913

Synonyms
- Trischalis iridescens orientalis Rothschild, 1913

Species of moth

Trischalis iridescens is a moth in the family Erebidae. It was described by Walter Rothschild in 1913. It is found in New Guinea.
