= Chrysomesia barbicostata =

Scientific classification
- Kingdom: Animalia
- Phylum: Arthropoda
- Class: Insecta
- Order: Lepidoptera
- Superfamily: Noctuoidea
- Family: Erebidae
- Subfamily: Arctiinae
- Genus: Chrysomesia
- Species: C. barbicostata

Binomial name
- Chrysomesia barbicostata Hampson, 1903

Species of moth

Chrysomesia barbicostata is a moth of the family Erebidae first described by George Hampson in 1903. It is found in New Guinea.
