= Hesychopa =

Scientific classification
- Domain: Eukaryota
- Kingdom: Animalia
- Phylum: Arthropoda
- Class: Insecta
- Order: Lepidoptera
- Superfamily: Noctuoidea
- Family: Erebidae
- Subfamily: Arctiinae
- Tribe: Lithosiini
- Genus: Hesychopa; Turner, 1940

Genus of moths

Hesychopa is a genus of moths in the subfamily Arctiinae. The genus was described by Turner in 1940.

== Species ==
- Hesychopa chionora (Meyrick, 1886)
- Hesychopa molybdica Turner, 1940
