= Parascaptia variegata =

Scientific classification
- Domain: Eukaryota
- Kingdom: Animalia
- Phylum: Arthropoda
- Class: Insecta
- Order: Lepidoptera
- Superfamily: Noctuoidea
- Family: Erebidae
- Subfamily: Arctiinae
- Genus: Parascaptia
- Species: P. variegata

Binomial name
- Parascaptia variegata Rothschild, 1912

Synonyms
- Stictosia variegata Rothschild, 1912; Garudinistis variegata

Species of moth

Parascaptia variegata is a moth of the subfamily Arctiinae. It was described by Rothschild in 1912. It is found in New Guinea.
