= Padenodes unifascia =

Scientific classification
- Domain: Eukaryota
- Kingdom: Animalia
- Phylum: Arthropoda
- Class: Insecta
- Order: Lepidoptera
- Superfamily: Noctuoidea
- Family: Erebidae
- Subfamily: Arctiinae
- Genus: Padenodes
- Species: P. unifascia

Binomial name
- Padenodes unifascia Rothschild, 1912

Species of moth

Padenodes unifascia is a moth of the family Erebidae. It was described by Walter Rothschild in 1912. It is found in New Guinea.
