= Parascaptia =

Scientific classification
- Domain: Eukaryota
- Kingdom: Animalia
- Phylum: Arthropoda
- Class: Insecta
- Order: Lepidoptera
- Superfamily: Noctuoidea
- Family: Erebidae
- Subfamily: Arctiinae
- Subtribe: Cisthenina
- Genus: Parascaptia; Bethune-Baker, 1908

Synonyms
- Porphyrochrysa Turner, 1940

Genus of moths

Parascaptia is a genus of moths in the subfamily Arctiinae.

== Species ==
- Parascaptia biplagata Bethune-Baker, 1908
- Parascaptia dochmoschema (Turner, 1940)
- Parascaptia insignifica Rothschild, 1916
- Parascaptia variegata Rothschild, 1912
