= Parascaptia insignifica =

Scientific classification
- Domain: Eukaryota
- Kingdom: Animalia
- Phylum: Arthropoda
- Class: Insecta
- Order: Lepidoptera
- Superfamily: Noctuoidea
- Family: Erebidae
- Subfamily: Arctiinae
- Genus: Parascaptia
- Species: P. insignifica

Binomial name
- Parascaptia insignifica Rothschild, 1916

Species of moth

Parascaptia insignifica is a moth of the subfamily Arctiinae. It was described by Rothschild in 1916. It is found in Papua New Guinea.
