= Hectobrocha =

Scientific classification
- Kingdom: Animalia
- Phylum: Arthropoda
- Class: Insecta
- Order: Lepidoptera
- Superfamily: Noctuoidea
- Family: Erebidae
- Subfamily: Arctiinae
- Tribe: Lithosiini
- Genus: Hectobrocha; Meyrick, 1886

Genus of moths

Hectobrocha is a genus of moths in the subfamily Arctiinae. The genus was erected by Edward Meyrick in 1886.

== Species ==
- Hectobrocha adoxa (Meyrick, 1886)
- Hectobrocha multilinea T. P. Lucas, 1890
- Hectobrocha pentacyma Meyrick, 1886
- Hectobrocha subnigra T. P. Lucas, 1890
