= Ionthas =

Scientific classification
- Kingdom: Animalia
- Phylum: Arthropoda
- Clade: Pancrustacea
- Class: Insecta
- Order: Lepidoptera
- Superfamily: Noctuoidea
- Family: Erebidae
- Subfamily: Arctiinae
- Tribe: Lithosiini
- Genus: Ionthas; Hampson, 1914

Genus of moths

Ionthas is a genus of moths in the subfamily Arctiinae.

== Species ==
- Ionthas ataracta Hampson, 1914
- Ionthas thirkelli (Fraser, 1961)
