= Cheliosea =

Scientific classification
- Domain: Eukaryota
- Kingdom: Animalia
- Phylum: Arthropoda
- Class: Insecta
- Order: Lepidoptera
- Superfamily: Noctuoidea
- Family: Erebidae
- Subfamily: Arctiinae
- Subtribe: Spilosomina
- Genus: Cheliosea; Watson, 1980

Type species
- Spilosoma cosmeta Lower, 1907

Synonyms
- Heliocaes Turner, 1940 (preocc. Bedel, 1906)

Genus of moths

Cheliosea is a genus of tiger moths in the family Erebidae described by Watson in 1980. The moths in the genus are found in Australia.

== Species ==
- Cheliosea cosmeta (Lower, 1907)

== Unknown status ==
- Cheliosea xanthotypa, described as Heliocaes xanthotypa Turner, 1940 from northern Australia is a species inquirenda.
