= Trischalis =

Scientific classification
- Kingdom: Animalia
- Phylum: Arthropoda
- Class: Insecta
- Order: Lepidoptera
- Superfamily: Noctuoidea
- Family: Erebidae
- Subfamily: Arctiinae
- Tribe: Lithosiini
- Genus: Trischalis; Hampson, 1894

Genus of moths

Trischalis is a genus of moths in the family Erebidae erected by George Hampson in 1894.

== Description ==
Palpi slight and porrect (extending forward). Antennae minutely ciliated in male. Forewings short, broad and rounded with arched costa. Veins 4,5 and 6,7 and 8,9 stalked. Hindwings with stalked veins 4,5 and 6,7. Vein 8 from middle of cell.

== Species ==
- Trischalis absconditana (Walker, 1863)
- Trischalis aureoplagiata (Rothschild, 1913)
- Trischalis convoluta Hampson, 1918
- Trischalis iridescens Rothschild, 1913
- Trischalis purpurastriata De Vos & van Mastrigt, 2007
- Trischalis splendens De Vos & van Mastrigt, 2007
- Trischalis stomata Holloway, 2001
- Trischalis subaurana (Walker, 1863)
- Trischalis zahrae De Vos & van Mastrigt, 2007
