= Eutane nivea =

Scientific classification
- Kingdom: Animalia
- Phylum: Arthropoda
- Class: Insecta
- Order: Lepidoptera
- Superfamily: Noctuoidea
- Family: Erebidae
- Subfamily: Arctiinae
- Genus: Eutane
- Species: E. nivea

Binomial name
- Eutane nivea Hampson, 1905

Species of moth

Eutane nivea is a moth of the subfamily Arctiinae. It was described by George Hampson in 1905. It is known to originate from Borneo. The habitat consists of lowland forests, including coastal and swamp forests.

Adults are a satiny white colour; the forewings with a black discal dot.
