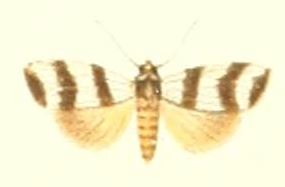

Scientific classification
- Domain: Eukaryota
- Kingdom: Animalia
- Phylum: Arthropoda
- Class: Insecta
- Order: Lepidoptera
- Superfamily: Noctuoidea
- Family: Erebidae
- Subfamily: Arctiinae
- Genus: Eutane
- Species: E. triplagata

Binomial name
- Eutane triplagata Pagenstecher, 1900

= Eutane triplagata =

Species of moth

Eutane triplagata is a moth of the subfamily Arctiinae first described by Pagenstecher in 1900. It is found in Papua New Guinea.
