= Symmetrodes =

Scientific classification
- Kingdom: Animalia
- Phylum: Arthropoda
- Class: Insecta
- Order: Lepidoptera
- Superfamily: Noctuoidea
- Family: Erebidae
- Subfamily: Arctiinae
- Tribe: Lithosiini
- Genus: Symmetrodes; Meyrick, 1886

Synonyms
- Habrochroma Turner, 1940

Genus of moths

Symmetrodes is a genus of moth in the subfamily Arctiinae.

== Species ==
- Symmetrodes sciocosma Meyrick, 1888
- Symmetrodes platymelas Turner, 1940
