= Poliodule =

Scientific classification
- Kingdom: Animalia
- Phylum: Arthropoda
- Class: Insecta
- Order: Lepidoptera
- Superfamily: Noctuoidea
- Family: Erebidae
- Subfamily: Arctiinae
- Tribe: Lithosiini
- Genus: Poliodule; Hampson, 1900

Genus of moths

Poliodule is a genus of moths in the subfamily Arctiinae. The genus was erected by George Hampson in 1900.

== Species ==
- Poliodule melanotricha Turner, 1941
- Poliodule poliotricha Turner, 1940
- Poliodule xanthodelta Lower, 1897
