= Trischalis zahrae =

Scientific classification
- Kingdom: Animalia
- Phylum: Arthropoda
- Class: Insecta
- Order: Lepidoptera
- Superfamily: Noctuoidea
- Family: Erebidae
- Subfamily: Arctiinae
- Genus: Trischalis
- Species: T. zahrae

Binomial name
- Trischalis zahrae De Vos & van Mastrigt, 2007

Species of moth

Trischalis zahrae is a moth in the family Erebidae. It was described by Rob de Vos and Henricus Jacobus Gerardus van Mastrigt in 2007. It is found in New Guinea.
