= Trischalis subaurana =

Scientific classification
- Kingdom: Animalia
- Phylum: Arthropoda
- Class: Insecta
- Order: Lepidoptera
- Superfamily: Noctuoidea
- Family: Erebidae
- Subfamily: Arctiinae
- Genus: Trischalis
- Species: T. subaurana

Binomial name
- Trischalis subaurana (Walker, 1863)

Synonyms
- Tospitis subaurana Walker, 1863; Pallene metalligera Butler, 1882

Species of moth

Trischalis subaurana is a moth in the family Erebidae. It was described by Francis Walker in 1863. It is found in the Indo-Australian tropics, from the north-eastern Himalayas and Hainan, China to the Bismarck Archipelago. The habitat consists of forests, ranging from the lowlands to the lower montane zone at about 1,000 meters.
