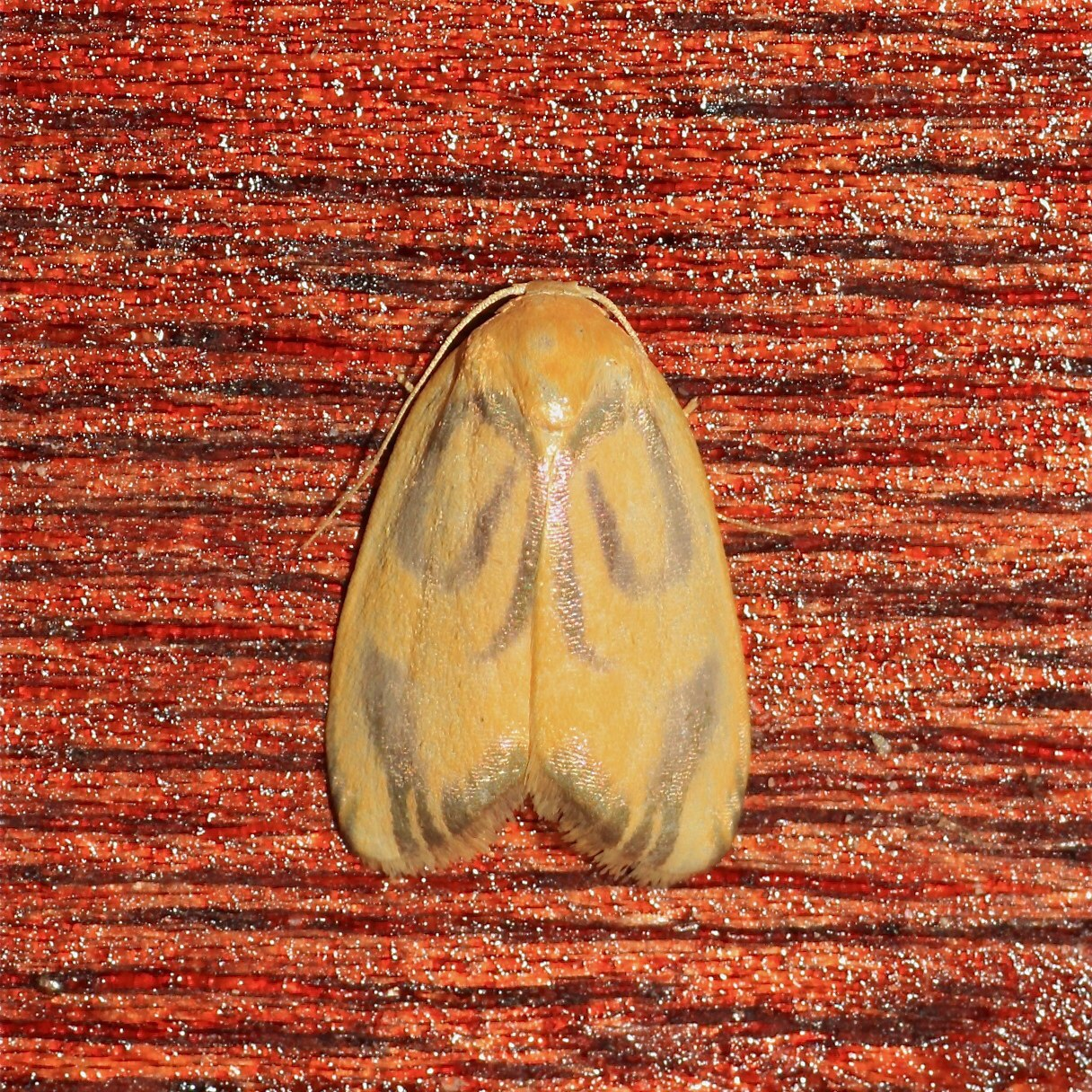

Scientific classification
- Kingdom: Animalia
- Phylum: Arthropoda
- Clade: Pancrustacea
- Class: Insecta
- Order: Lepidoptera
- Superfamily: Noctuoidea
- Family: Erebidae
- Subfamily: Arctiinae
- Genus: Trischalis
- Species: T. stomata

Binomial name
- Trischalis stomata Holloway, 2001

= Trischalis stomata =

Species of moth

Trischalis stomata is a moth in the family Erebidae. It was described by Jeremy Daniel Holloway in 2001. It is found on Borneo, Bali and in Singapore.

The length of the forewings is 7–8 mm.
