= Trischalis absconditana =

Scientific classification
- Kingdom: Animalia
- Phylum: Arthropoda
- Clade: Pancrustacea
- Class: Insecta
- Order: Lepidoptera
- Superfamily: Noctuoidea
- Family: Erebidae
- Subfamily: Arctiinae
- Genus: Trischalis
- Species: T. absconditana

Binomial name
- Trischalis absconditana (Walker, 1863)

Synonyms
- Tospitis absconditana Walker, 1863; Hemonia flava Hampson, 1893

Species of moth

Trischalis absconditana is a moth in the family Erebidae. It was described by Francis Walker in 1863. It is found in Assam in India and in Sri Lanka.

== Description ==
The head, thorax and abdomen are yellowish. Forewings yellow with a broad fuscous band below the costa which commencing as a patch on the inner basal area and curving round to outer angle. Hindwings are pale yellow.
