= Meteura =

Scientific classification
- Kingdom: Animalia
- Phylum: Arthropoda
- Class: Insecta
- Order: Lepidoptera
- Superfamily: Noctuoidea
- Family: Erebidae
- Subfamily: Arctiinae
- Tribe: Lithosiini
- Genus: Meteura; Hampson, 1900

Genus of moths

Meteura is a genus of moths in the subfamily Arctiinae erected by George Hampson in 1900.

== Species ==
- Meteura albicosta Hampson, 1914
- Meteura cervina T. P. Lucas, 1890
