= Chrysomesia =

Scientific classification
- Kingdom: Animalia
- Phylum: Arthropoda
- Class: Insecta
- Order: Lepidoptera
- Superfamily: Noctuoidea
- Family: Erebidae
- Subfamily: Arctiinae
- Tribe: Lithosiini
- Genus: Chrysomesia; Hampson, 1903

Genus of moths

Chrysomesia is a genus of moths in the family Erebidae.

== Species ==
- Chrysomesia barbicostata (Hampson, 1903)
- Chrysomesia lophoptera (Turner, 1940)
