= Padenodes =

Scientific classification
- Domain: Eukaryota
- Kingdom: Animalia
- Phylum: Arthropoda
- Class: Insecta
- Order: Lepidoptera
- Superfamily: Noctuoidea
- Family: Erebidae
- Subfamily: Arctiinae
- Subtribe: Nudariina
- Genus: Padenodes; Rothschild, 1912

Synonyms
- Padenodes Hampson, 1914

Genus of moths

Padenodes is a genus of moths in the family Erebidae.

== Species ==
- Padenodes cuprizona Hampson, 1914
- Padenodes unifascia Rothschild, 1912
