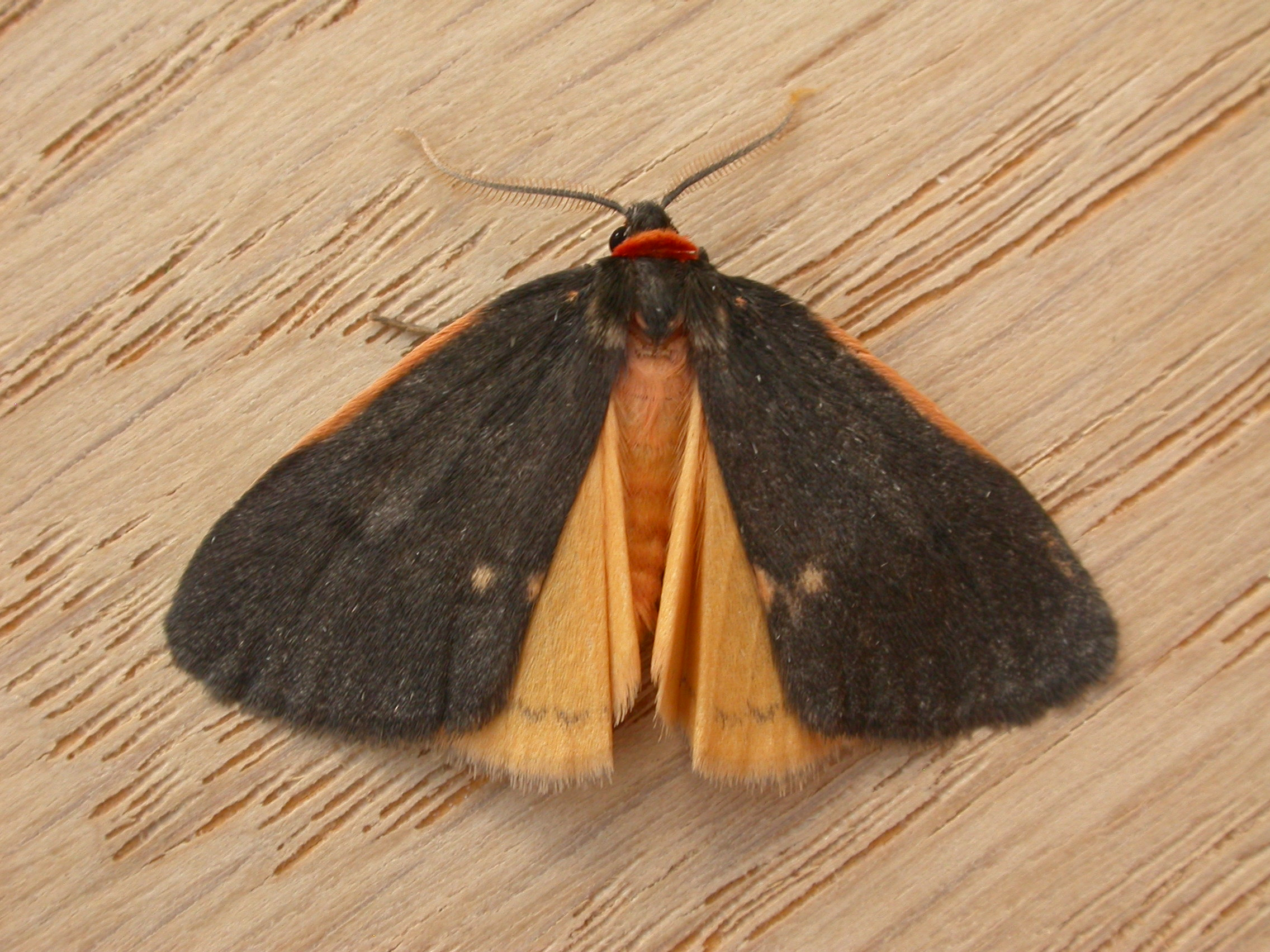
- Castulo doubledayi

Scientific classification
- Kingdom: Animalia
- Phylum: Arthropoda
- Class: Insecta
- Order: Lepidoptera
- Superfamily: Noctuoidea
- Family: Erebidae
- Subfamily: Arctiinae
- Tribe: Lithosiini
- Genus: Castulo; Walker, 1854

Synonyms
- Castula Walker, 1854; Cluaca Walker, 1865

= Castulo (moth) =

Genus of moths

Castulo is a genus of moths in the subfamily Arctiinae erected by Francis Walker in 1854. The genus consists of two species, both found in Australia.

== Species ==
- Castulo doubledayi
- Castulo plagiata
