= Thallarcha phalarota =

Scientific classification
- Kingdom: Animalia
- Phylum: Arthropoda
- Class: Insecta
- Order: Lepidoptera
- Superfamily: Noctuoidea
- Family: Erebidae
- Subfamily: Arctiinae
- Genus: Thallarcha
- Species: T. phalarota

Binomial name
- Thallarcha phalarota Meyrick, 1886

Synonyms
- Thallarcha phaedropa Meyrick, 1886; Thallarcha aurantiacea T. P. Lucas, 1890

Species of moth

Thallarcha phalarota, the adorned footman, is a moth in the subfamily Arctiinae. It was described by Edward Meyrick in 1886. It is found in Australia, where it has been recorded from the Australian Capital Territory, New South Wales, Queensland and Victoria.

The wingspan is about 10 mm. The forewings are black with two white bands.
