= Ionthas thirkelli =

Scientific classification
- Domain: Eukaryota
- Kingdom: Animalia
- Phylum: Arthropoda
- Class: Insecta
- Order: Lepidoptera
- Superfamily: Noctuoidea
- Family: Erebidae
- Subfamily: Arctiinae
- Genus: Ionthas
- Species: I. thirkelli

Binomial name
- Ionthas thirkelli (Fraser, 1961)

Synonyms
- Castulo thirkelli Fraser, 1961

Species of moth

Ionthas thirkelli is a moth of the subfamily Arctiinae first described by Fraser in 1961. It is found in Australia (New South Wales).
