= Scaphidriotis camptopleura =

Scientific classification
- Domain: Eukaryota
- Kingdom: Animalia
- Phylum: Arthropoda
- Class: Insecta
- Order: Lepidoptera
- Superfamily: Noctuoidea
- Family: Erebidae
- Subfamily: Arctiinae
- Genus: Scaphidriotis
- Species: S. camptopleura

Binomial name
- Scaphidriotis camptopleura (Turner, 1940)

Synonyms
- Psapharacis camptopleura Turner, 1940

Species of moth

Scaphidriotis camptopleura is a moth of the subfamily Arctiinae. It was described by Turner in 1940. It is found in the Australian state of Queensland.
