= Scaphidriotis xylogramma =

Scientific classification
- Domain: Eukaryota
- Kingdom: Animalia
- Phylum: Arthropoda
- Class: Insecta
- Order: Lepidoptera
- Superfamily: Noctuoidea
- Family: Erebidae
- Subfamily: Arctiinae
- Genus: Scaphidriotis
- Species: S. xylogramma

Binomial name
- Scaphidriotis xylogramma Turner, 1899

Species of moth

Scaphidriotis xylogramma is a moth of the subfamily Arctiinae. It was described by Alfred Jefferis Turner in 1899. It is found in the Australian state of Queensland.
