= Parascaptia dochmoschema =

Scientific classification
- Domain: Eukaryota
- Kingdom: Animalia
- Phylum: Arthropoda
- Class: Insecta
- Order: Lepidoptera
- Superfamily: Noctuoidea
- Family: Erebidae
- Subfamily: Arctiinae
- Genus: Parascaptia
- Species: P. dochmoschema

Binomial name
- Parascaptia dochmoschema (Turner, 1940)

Synonyms
- Porphyrochrysa dochmoschema Turner, 1940

Species of moth

Parascaptia dochmoschema is a moth of the subfamily Arctiinae. It was described by Turner in 1940. It is found in Australia.
