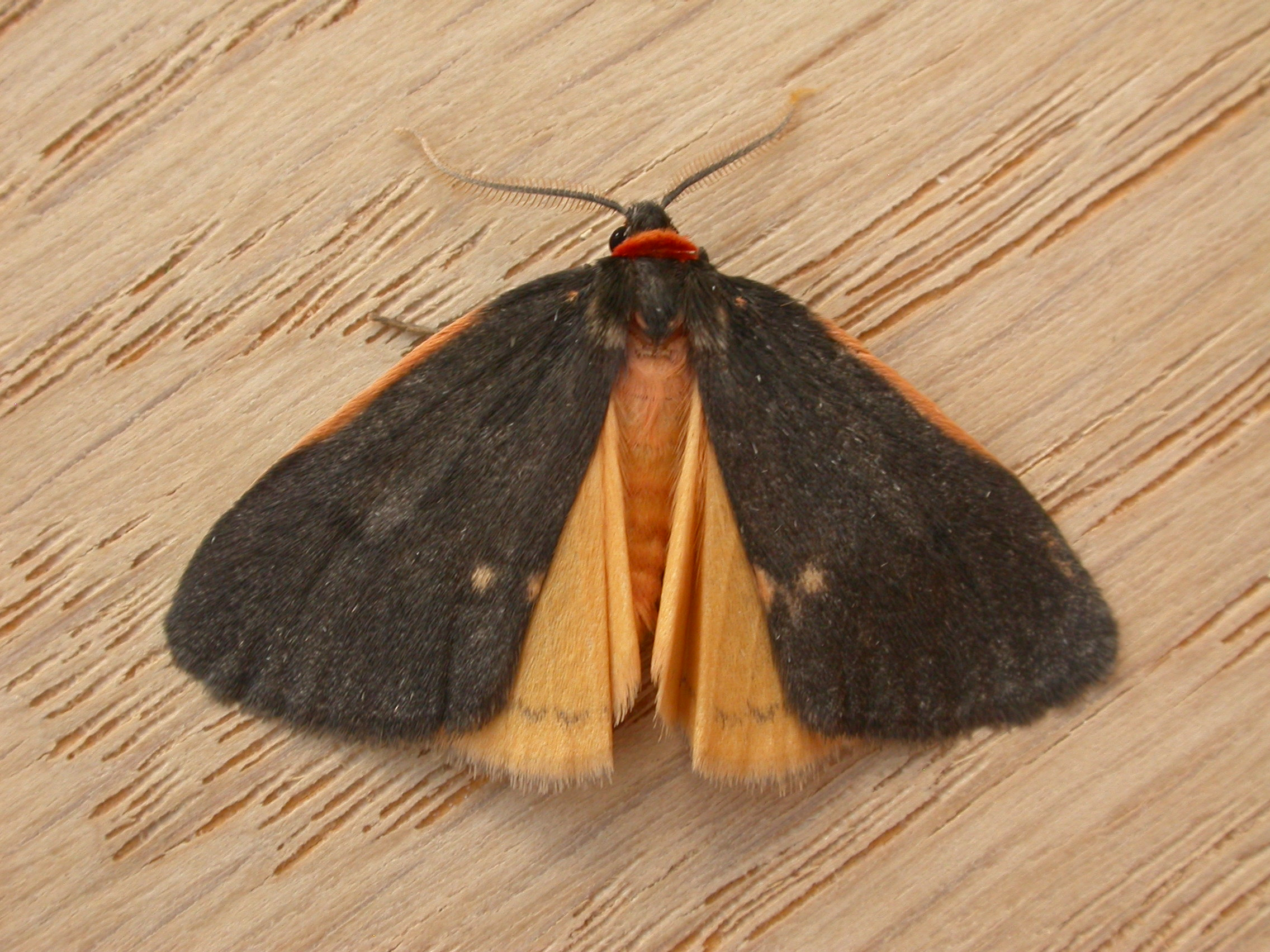

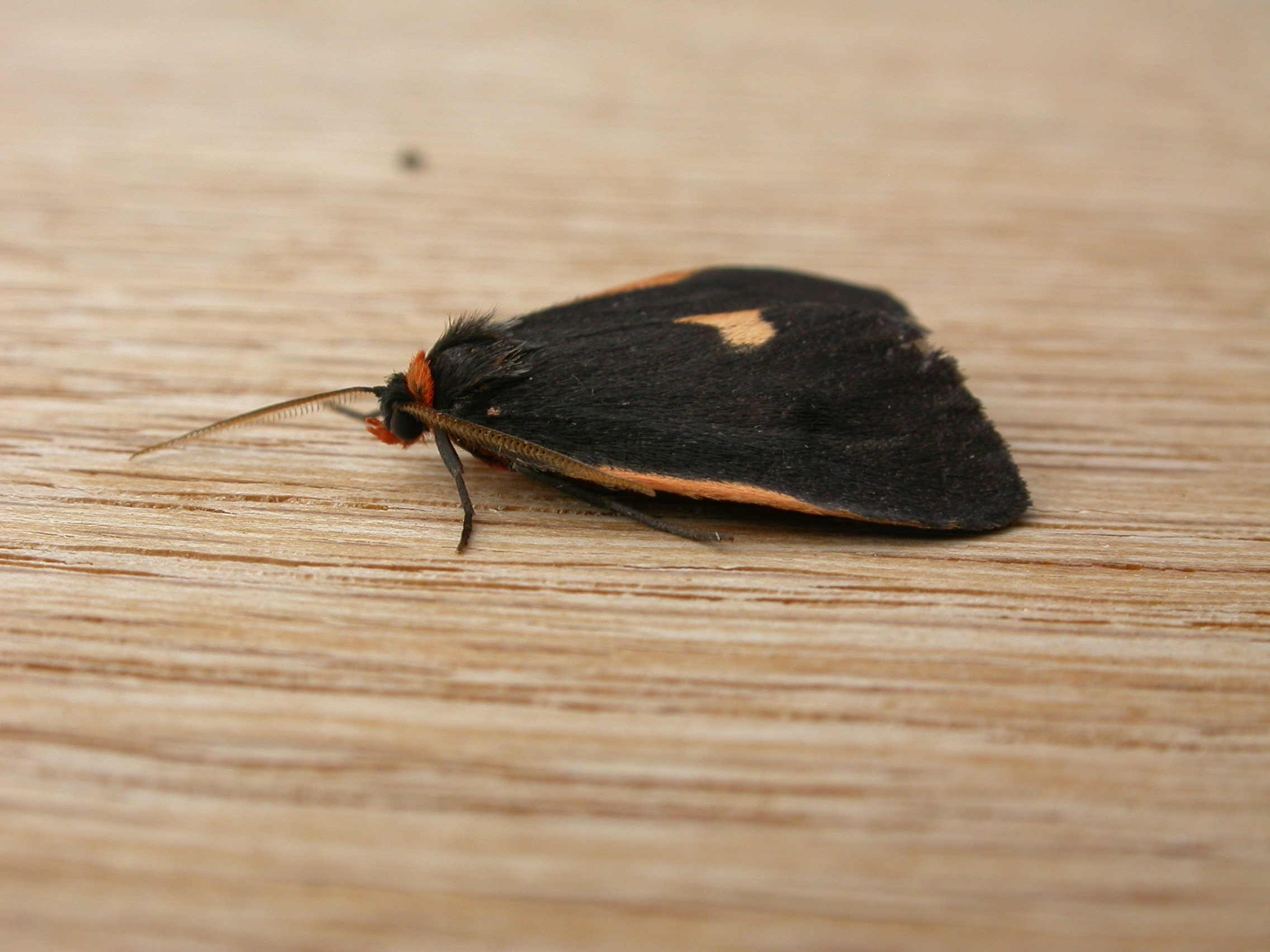

Scientific classification
- Domain: Eukaryota
- Kingdom: Animalia
- Phylum: Arthropoda
- Class: Insecta
- Order: Lepidoptera
- Superfamily: Noctuoidea
- Family: Erebidae
- Subfamily: Arctiinae
- Genus: Castulo
- Species: C. doubledayi

Binomial name
- Castulo doubledayi Newman, 1857

Synonyms
- Cluaca rubricosta Walker, [1865]; Castula binotata Walker, 1869

= Castulo doubledayi =

Species of moth

Castulo doubledayi is a moth of the subfamily Arctiinae first described by Edward Newman in 1857. It is found in the Australian states of Victoria and Tasmania.
