= Padenodes cuprizona =

Scientific classification
- Kingdom: Animalia
- Phylum: Arthropoda
- Class: Insecta
- Order: Lepidoptera
- Superfamily: Noctuoidea
- Family: Erebidae
- Subfamily: Arctiinae
- Genus: Padenodes
- Species: P. cuprizona

Binomial name
- Padenodes cuprizona Hampson, 1914

Synonyms
- Padenia unifasciana Strand, 1922; Padenia unifascia Rothschild, 1916 (preocc. Rothschild, 1912)

Species of moth

Padenodes cuprizona is a moth of the family Erebidae. It was described by George Hampson in 1914. It is found on New Guinea and Australia.
