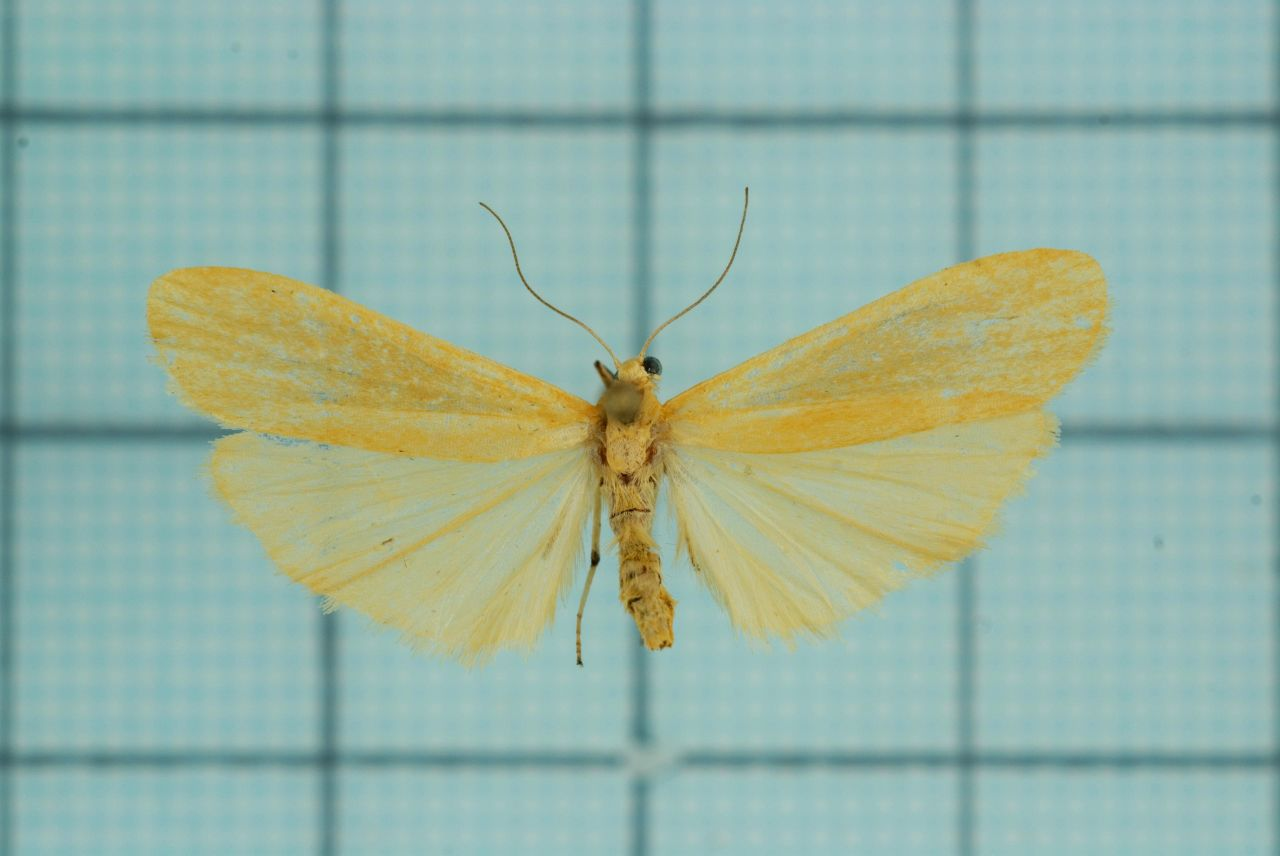

Scientific classification
- Kingdom: Animalia
- Phylum: Arthropoda
- Class: Insecta
- Order: Lepidoptera
- Superfamily: Noctuoidea
- Family: Erebidae
- Subfamily: Arctiinae
- Tribe: Lithosiini
- Genus: Aedoea; Turner, 1899
- Species: A. monochroa

Binomial name
- Aedoea monochroa Turner, 1899

Synonyms
- Aedoea monochroa Turner, 1899; Eilema decreta pulolautensis Strand, 1922; Eilema pulolautensis Strand, 1922

= Aedoea =

Genus of moths

Aedoea is a genus of moth in the subfamily Arctiinae. It contains only one species, Aedoea monochroa, which is found in Borneo (more precisely, Laut Island) and Australia.
