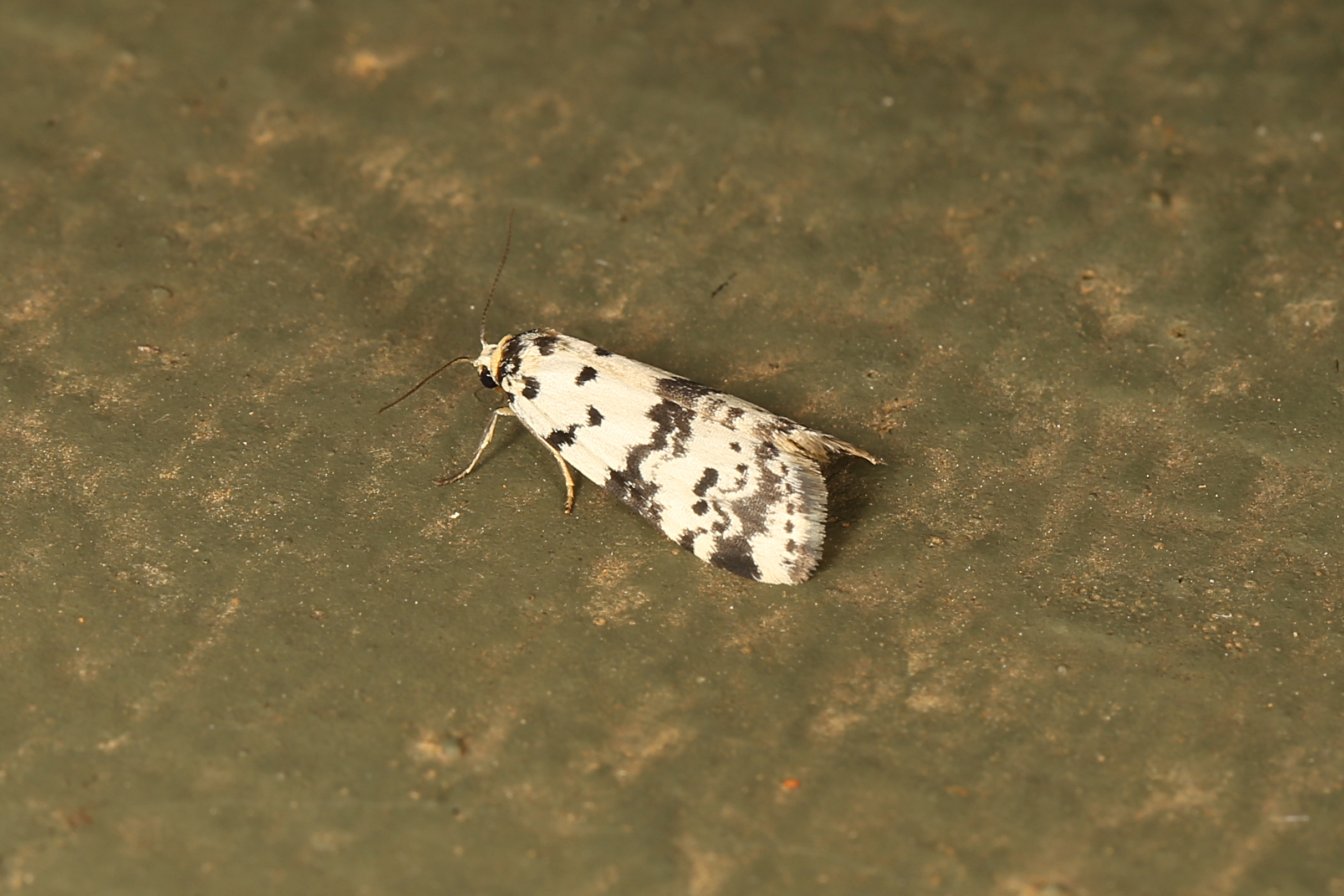
- In Little Desert National Park, Victoria, Australia

Scientific classification
- Domain: Eukaryota
- Kingdom: Animalia
- Phylum: Arthropoda
- Class: Insecta
- Order: Lepidoptera
- Superfamily: Noctuoidea
- Family: Erebidae
- Subfamily: Arctiinae
- Genus: Thallarcha
- Species: T. rhaptophora

Binomial name
- Thallarcha rhaptophora Lower, 1915

= Thallarcha rhaptophora =

Species of moth

Thallarcha rhaptophora is a moth in the subfamily Arctiinae. It was described by Oswald Bertram Lower in 1915. It is found in Australia, where it has been recorded from New South Wales, Victoria and Western Australia.
