= Thallarcha epileuca =

Scientific classification
- Domain: Eukaryota
- Kingdom: Animalia
- Phylum: Arthropoda
- Class: Insecta
- Order: Lepidoptera
- Superfamily: Noctuoidea
- Family: Erebidae
- Subfamily: Arctiinae
- Genus: Thallarcha
- Species: T. epileuca

Binomial name
- Thallarcha epileuca Turner, 1922

Species of moth

Thallarcha epileuca is a moth in the subfamily Arctiinae. It was described by Alfred Jefferis Turner in 1922. It is found in Australia, where it has been recorded from Queensland.

The forewings are brown with white patches.
