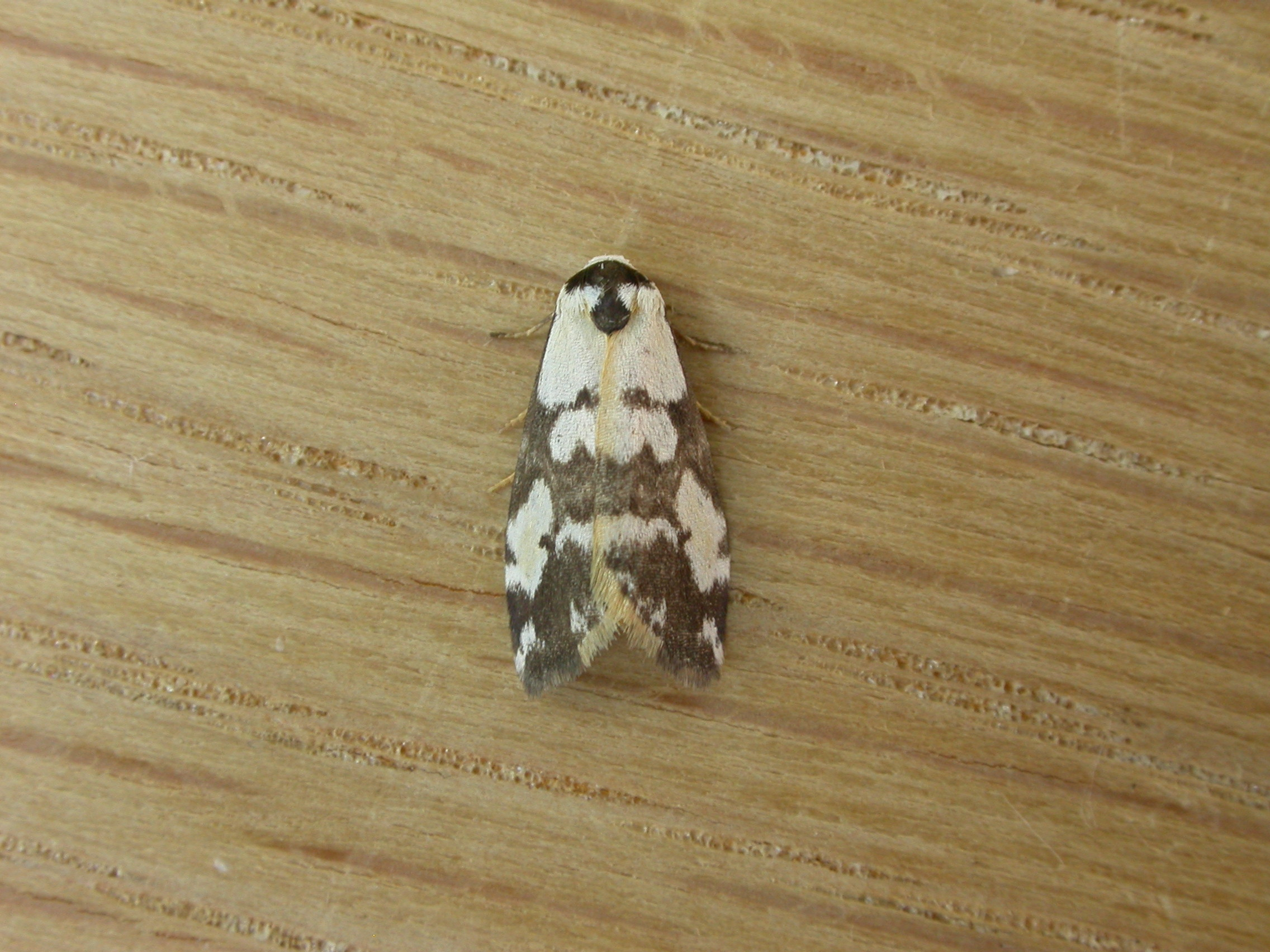

Scientific classification
- Domain: Eukaryota
- Kingdom: Animalia
- Phylum: Arthropoda
- Class: Insecta
- Order: Lepidoptera
- Superfamily: Noctuoidea
- Family: Erebidae
- Subfamily: Arctiinae
- Genus: Thallarcha
- Species: T. pellax

Binomial name
- Thallarcha pellax Turner, 1940

= Thallarcha pellax =

Species of moth

Thallarcha pellax is a moth of the subfamily Arctiinae first described by Alfred Jefferis Turner in 1940. It is found in Australia.
