= Poliodule xanthodelta =

Scientific classification
- Domain: Eukaryota
- Kingdom: Animalia
- Phylum: Arthropoda
- Class: Insecta
- Order: Lepidoptera
- Superfamily: Noctuoidea
- Family: Erebidae
- Subfamily: Arctiinae
- Genus: Poliodule
- Species: P. xanthodelta

Binomial name
- Poliodule xanthodelta (Lower, 1897)

Synonyms
- Scoliacma xanthodelta Lower, 1897

Species of moth

Poliodule xanthodelta is a moth in the subfamily Arctiinae. It was described by Oswald Bertram Lower in 1897. It is found in Australia.
