= Poliodule melanotricha =

Scientific classification
- Domain: Eukaryota
- Kingdom: Animalia
- Phylum: Arthropoda
- Class: Insecta
- Order: Lepidoptera
- Superfamily: Noctuoidea
- Family: Erebidae
- Subfamily: Arctiinae
- Genus: Poliodule
- Species: P. melanotricha

Binomial name
- Poliodule melanotricha Turner, 1941

Species of moth

Poliodule melanotricha is a moth in the subfamily Arctiinae. It was described by Alfred Jefferis Turner in 1941. It is found in Australia.
