= Ionthas ataracta =

Scientific classification
- Kingdom: Animalia
- Phylum: Arthropoda
- Class: Insecta
- Order: Lepidoptera
- Superfamily: Noctuoidea
- Family: Erebidae
- Subfamily: Arctiinae
- Genus: Ionthas
- Species: I. ataracta

Binomial name
- Ionthas ataracta Hampson, 1914

Species of moth

Ionthas ataracta is a moth of the subfamily Arctiinae first described by George Hampson in 1914. It is found in Queensland, Australia.
