= Hectobrocha subnigra =

Scientific classification
- Domain: Eukaryota
- Kingdom: Animalia
- Phylum: Arthropoda
- Class: Insecta
- Order: Lepidoptera
- Superfamily: Noctuoidea
- Family: Erebidae
- Subfamily: Arctiinae
- Genus: Hectobrocha
- Species: H. subnigra

Binomial name
- Hectobrocha subnigra T. P. Lucas, 1890

Species of moth

Hectobrocha subnigra is a moth of the subfamily Arctiinae. It was described by Thomas Pennington Lucas in 1890. It is found in Australia, where it has been recorded from south-eastern Queensland.
