= Cheliosea cosmeta =

Scientific classification
- Domain: Eukaryota
- Kingdom: Animalia
- Phylum: Arthropoda
- Class: Insecta
- Order: Lepidoptera
- Superfamily: Noctuoidea
- Family: Erebidae
- Subfamily: Arctiinae
- Genus: Cheliosea
- Species: C. cosmeta

Binomial name
- Cheliosea cosmeta (Lower, 1907)

Synonyms
- Spilosoma cosmeta Lower, 1907; Heliocaes cosmeta

Species of moth

Cheliosea cosmeta, the sombre tiger moth, is a moth of the family Erebidae. It was described by Oswald Bertram Lower in 1907. It is found in Australia in New South Wales, the Northern Territory, Victoria and South Australia).
