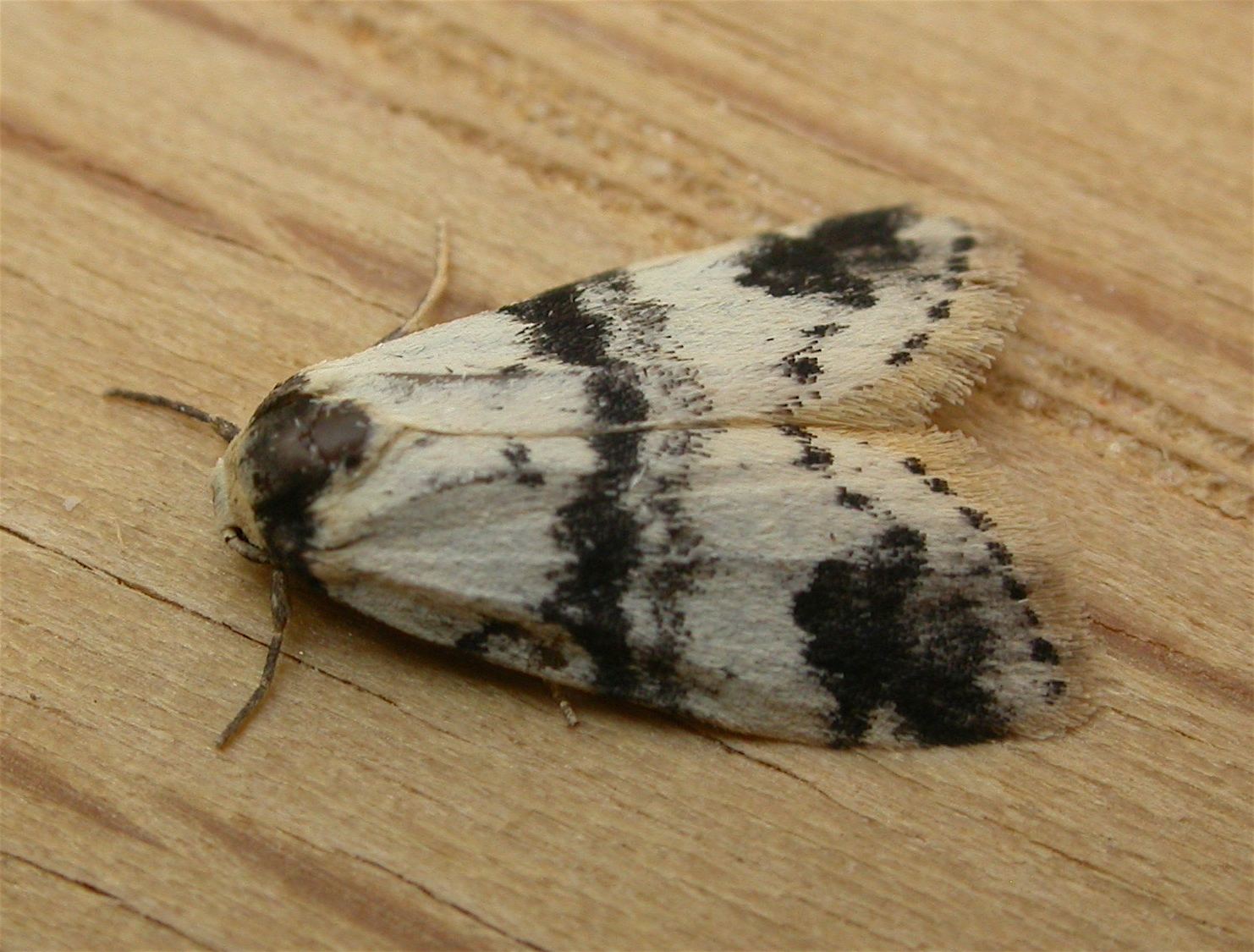

Scientific classification
- Kingdom: Animalia
- Phylum: Arthropoda
- Class: Insecta
- Order: Lepidoptera
- Superfamily: Noctuoidea
- Family: Erebidae
- Subfamily: Arctiinae
- Genus: Thallarcha
- Species: T. sparsana

Binomial name
- Thallarcha sparsana Walker, 1863

Synonyms
- Palene gracilis

= Thallarcha sparsana =

Species of moth

Thallarcha sparsana, the fair footman, is a moth of the subfamily Arctiinae. The species was first described by Francis Walker in 1863. It is found in the Australian states of Victoria, New South Wales and Queensland.
