= Hyposhada =

Scientific classification
- Kingdom: Animalia
- Phylum: Arthropoda
- Class: Insecta
- Order: Lepidoptera
- Superfamily: Noctuoidea
- Family: Erebidae
- Subfamily: Arctiinae
- Genus: Hyposhada; Hampson, 1909
- Species: H. pellopis

Binomial name
- Hyposhada pellopis (Bethune-Baker, 1908)

Synonyms
- Scoliacma pellopis Bethune-Baker, 1908

Genus of moths

Hyposhada is a genus of moths in the family Erebidae erected by George Hampson in 1909. Its only species, Hyposhada pellopis, was first described by George Thomas Bethune-Baker in 1908. It is found in Australia, where it has been recorded from Queensland.
