= Castulo plagiata =

Scientific classification
- Kingdom: Animalia
- Phylum: Arthropoda
- Class: Insecta
- Order: Lepidoptera
- Superfamily: Noctuoidea
- Family: Erebidae
- Subfamily: Arctiinae
- Genus: Castulo
- Species: C. plagiata

Binomial name
- Castulo plagiata Walker, 1854

Synonyms
- Cluaca struthias Meyrick, 1886

Species of moth

Castulo plagiata, the yellow-banded footman, is a moth of the subfamily Arctiinae. The species was first described by Francis Walker in 1854. It is found in the Australian states of New South Wales, Victoria and Tasmania.

The wingspan is about 30 mm. Adult males have black forewings with a yellow band across the middle. The hindwings are yellow with variable black margins.
