= Thallarcha isophragma =

Scientific classification
- Kingdom: Animalia
- Phylum: Arthropoda
- Class: Insecta
- Order: Lepidoptera
- Superfamily: Noctuoidea
- Family: Erebidae
- Subfamily: Arctiinae
- Genus: Thallarcha
- Species: T. isophragma

Binomial name
- Thallarcha isophragma (Meyrick, 1886)

Synonyms
- Comarchis isophragma Meyrick, 1886; Comarchis pallida T. P. Lucas, 1892

Species of moth

Thallarcha isophragma is a moth in the subfamily Arctiinae. It was described by Edward Meyrick in 1886. It is found in Australia, where it has been recorded from Tasmania.
