= Thallarcha epiostola =

Scientific classification
- Domain: Eukaryota
- Kingdom: Animalia
- Phylum: Arthropoda
- Class: Insecta
- Order: Lepidoptera
- Superfamily: Noctuoidea
- Family: Erebidae
- Subfamily: Arctiinae
- Genus: Thallarcha
- Species: T. epiostola

Binomial name
- Thallarcha epiostola Turner, 1926

Species of moth

Thallarcha epiostola is a moth in the subfamily Arctiinae. It was described by Alfred Jefferis Turner in 1926. It is found in Australia, where it has been recorded from Tasmania, New South Wales and Victoria.
