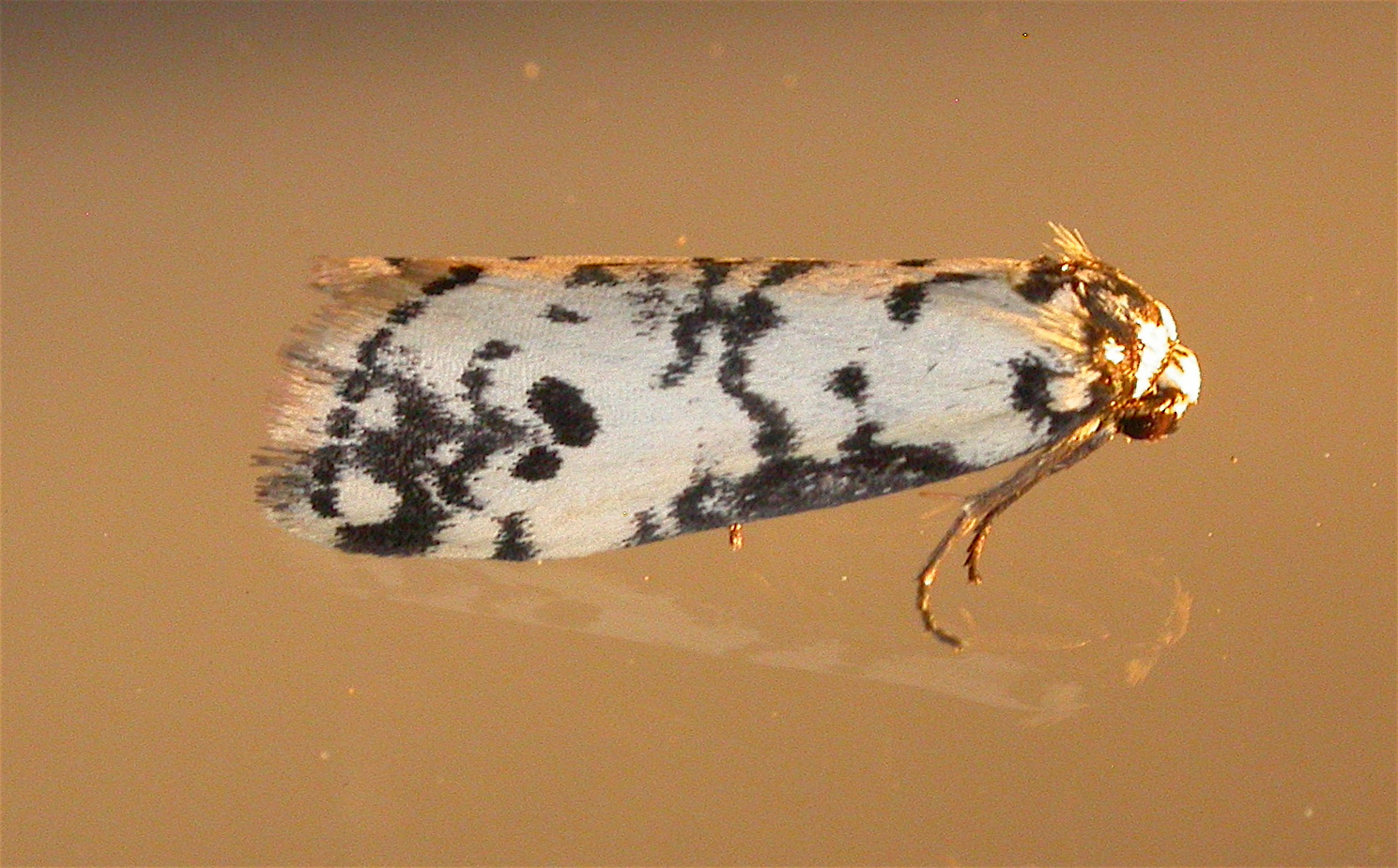

Scientific classification
- Domain: Eukaryota
- Kingdom: Animalia
- Phylum: Arthropoda
- Class: Insecta
- Order: Lepidoptera
- Superfamily: Noctuoidea
- Family: Erebidae
- Subfamily: Arctiinae
- Genus: Thallarcha
- Species: T. eremicola

Binomial name
- Thallarcha eremicola Pescott, 1951

= Thallarcha eremicola =

Species of moth

Thallarcha eremicola is a moth of the subfamily Arctiinae first described by Richard Thomas Martin Pescott in 1951. It is found in Australia.
