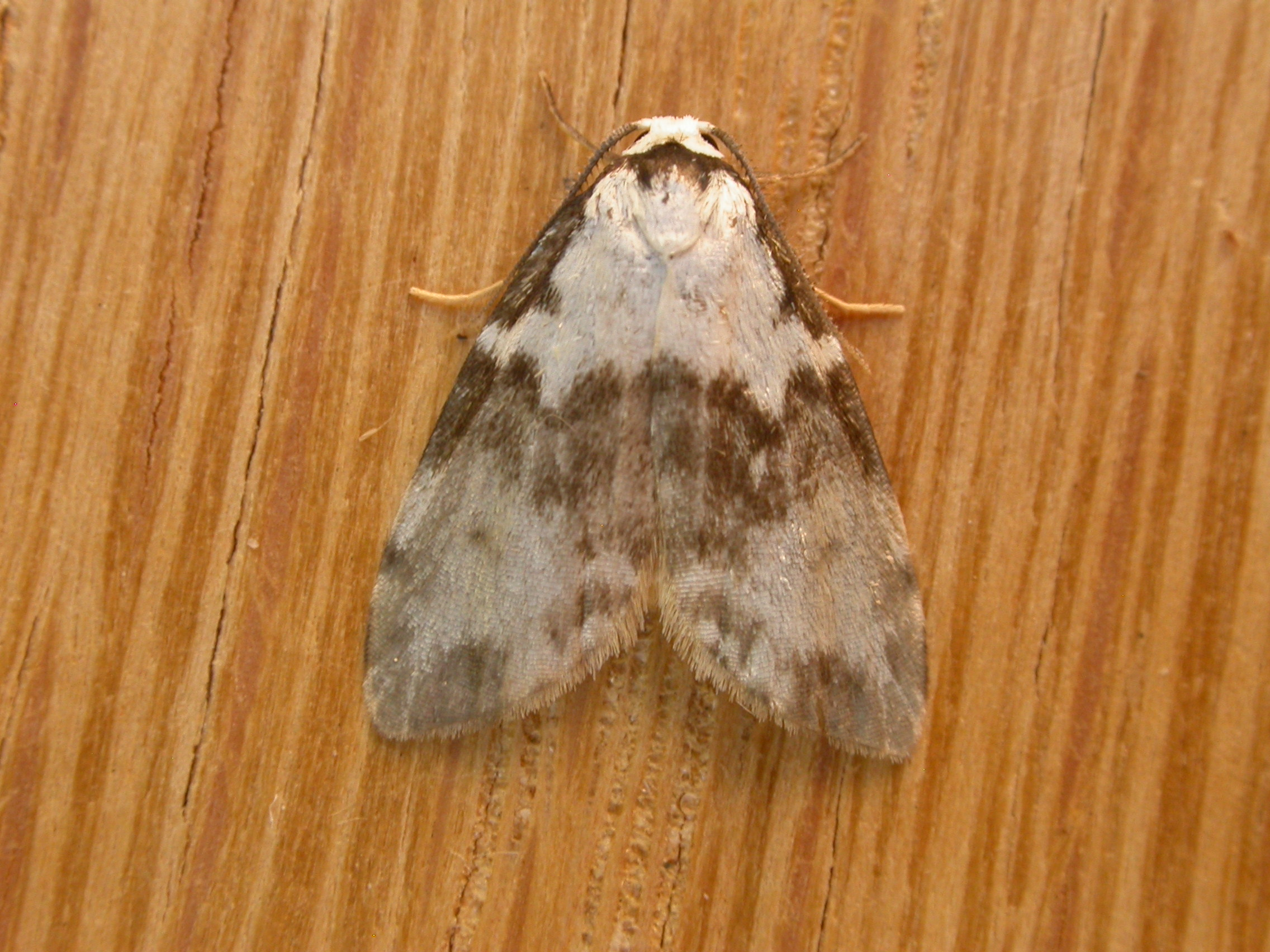

Scientific classification
- Domain: Eukaryota
- Kingdom: Animalia
- Phylum: Arthropoda
- Class: Insecta
- Order: Lepidoptera
- Superfamily: Noctuoidea
- Family: Erebidae
- Subfamily: Arctiinae
- Genus: Thallarcha
- Species: T. epicela

Binomial name
- Thallarcha epicela Turner, 1922

= Thallarcha epicela =

Species of moth

Thallarcha epicela is a moth of the subfamily Arctiinae first described by Alfred Jefferis Turner in 1922. It is found in Australia.
