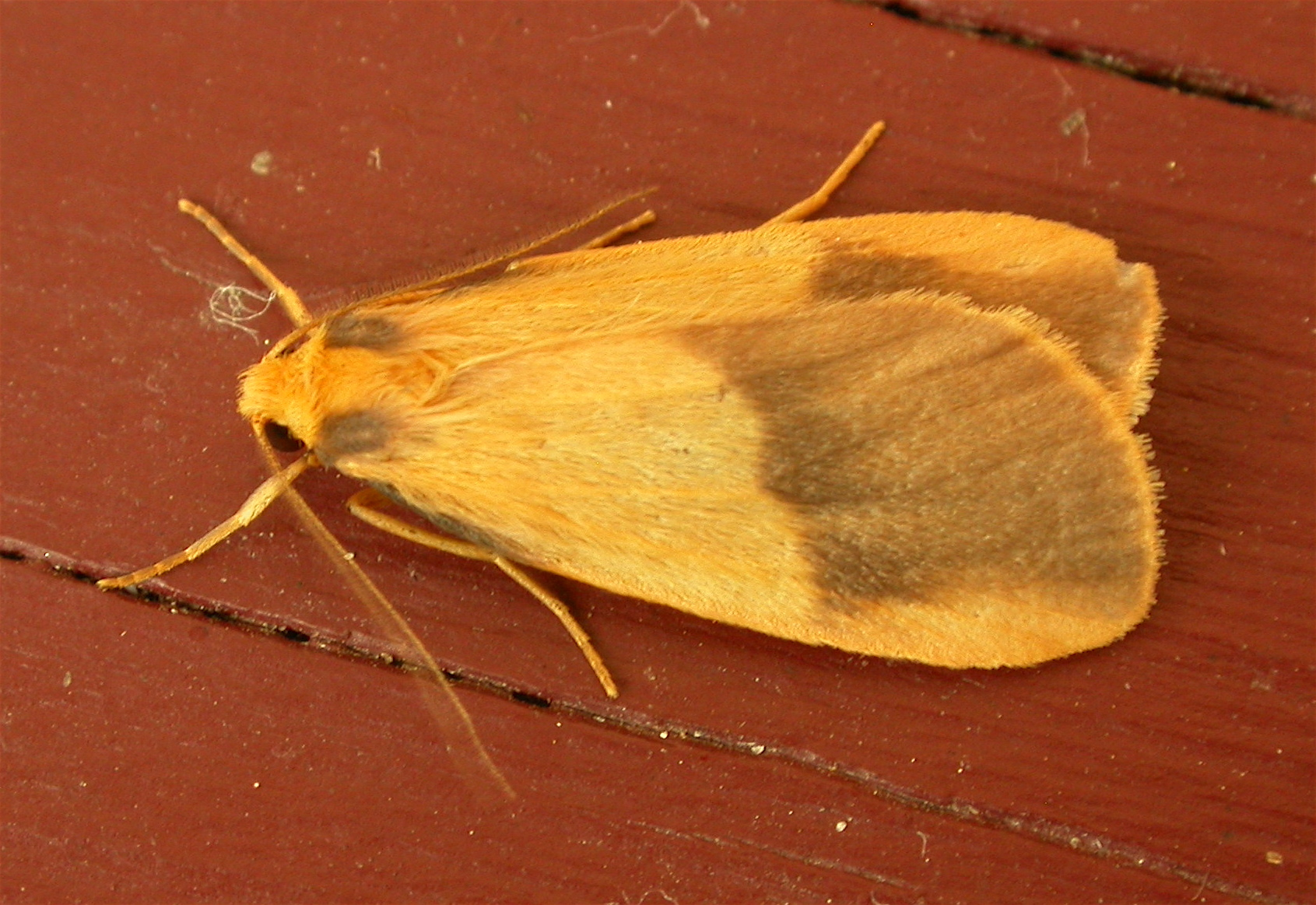

Scientific classification
- Kingdom: Animalia
- Phylum: Arthropoda
- Class: Insecta
- Order: Lepidoptera
- Superfamily: Noctuoidea
- Family: Erebidae
- Subfamily: Arctiinae
- Genus: Threnosia
- Species: T. heminephes

Binomial name
- Threnosia heminephes (Meyrick, 1886)

Synonyms
- Tigrioides heminephes Meyrick, 1886

= Threnosia heminephes =

Species of moth

Threnosia heminephes, commonly known as the halved footman, is a moth of the subfamily Arctiinae that was first described by Edward Meyrick in 1886.

It is found in Australia, where it has been recorded from the Australian Capital Territory, New South Wales and Victoria.
