= Thallarcha leptographa =

Scientific classification
- Domain: Eukaryota
- Kingdom: Animalia
- Phylum: Arthropoda
- Class: Insecta
- Order: Lepidoptera
- Superfamily: Noctuoidea
- Family: Erebidae
- Subfamily: Arctiinae
- Genus: Thallarcha
- Species: T. leptographa

Binomial name
- Thallarcha leptographa Turner, 1899

Species of moth

Thallarcha leptographa is a moth in the subfamily Arctiinae. It was described by Alfred Jefferis Turner in 1899. It is found in Australia, where it has been recorded from New South Wales and Queensland.
