= Thallarcha oblita =

Scientific classification
- Domain: Eukaryota
- Kingdom: Animalia
- Phylum: Arthropoda
- Class: Insecta
- Order: Lepidoptera
- Superfamily: Noctuoidea
- Family: Erebidae
- Subfamily: Arctiinae
- Genus: Thallarcha
- Species: T. oblita

Binomial name
- Thallarcha oblita (R. Felder & Rogenhofer, 1875)

Synonyms
- Pitane oblita R. Felder & Rogenhofer, 1875; Comarchis oblita

Species of moth

Thallarcha oblita, the hidden footman, is a moth in the subfamily Arctiinae. It was described by Rudolf Felder and Alois Friedrich Rogenhofer in 1875. It is found in Australia, where it has been recorded from the Australian Capital Territory, New South Wales and Victoria.

The wingspan is about 20 mm. The forewings are pale yellow with black zigzag lines and markings. The hindwings are yellow with a black band around the apex.
