= Thallarcha lechrioleuca =

Scientific classification
- Domain: Eukaryota
- Kingdom: Animalia
- Phylum: Arthropoda
- Class: Insecta
- Order: Lepidoptera
- Superfamily: Noctuoidea
- Family: Erebidae
- Subfamily: Arctiinae
- Genus: Thallarcha
- Species: T. lechrioleuca

Binomial name
- Thallarcha lechrioleuca Turner, 1940

Species of moth

Thallarcha lechrioleuca is a moth in the subfamily Arctiinae. It was described by Alfred Jefferis Turner in 1940. It is found in Australia, where it has been recorded from South Australia, Victoria and Western Australia.
