= Parascaptia biplagata =

Scientific classification
- Domain: Eukaryota
- Kingdom: Animalia
- Phylum: Arthropoda
- Class: Insecta
- Order: Lepidoptera
- Superfamily: Noctuoidea
- Family: Erebidae
- Subfamily: Arctiinae
- Genus: Parascaptia
- Species: P. biplagata

Binomial name
- Parascaptia biplagata Bethune-Baker, 1908

Synonyms
- Garudinia aureopurpurata Rothschild, 1912; Garudinia trifasciata Rothschild, 1912

Species of moth

Parascaptia biplagata is a moth of the subfamily Arctiinae. It was described by George Thomas Bethune-Baker in 1908. It is found in Papua New Guinea and Australia.
