= Meteura cervina =

Scientific classification
- Domain: Eukaryota
- Kingdom: Animalia
- Phylum: Arthropoda
- Class: Insecta
- Order: Lepidoptera
- Superfamily: Noctuoidea
- Family: Erebidae
- Subfamily: Arctiinae
- Genus: Meteura
- Species: M. cervina

Binomial name
- Meteura cervina (T. P. Lucas, 1890)

Synonyms
- Scoliacma cervina T. P. Lucas, 1890

Species of moth

Meteura cervina is a moth of the subfamily Arctiinae. It was described by Thomas Pennington Lucas in 1890. It is found in Australia, where it is known from south-eastern Queensland.
