= Trischalis aureoplagiata =

Scientific classification
- Domain: Eukaryota
- Kingdom: Animalia
- Phylum: Arthropoda
- Class: Insecta
- Order: Lepidoptera
- Superfamily: Noctuoidea
- Family: Erebidae
- Subfamily: Arctiinae
- Genus: Trischalis
- Species: T. aureoplagiata

Binomial name
- Trischalis aureoplagiata (Rothschild, 1913)

Synonyms
- Eugoa aureoplagiata Rothschild, 1913

Species of moth

Trischalis aureoplagiata is a moth in the family Erebidae. It was described by Walter Rothschild in 1913. It is found in New Guinea.
