= Eutane trimochla =

Scientific classification
- Domain: Eukaryota
- Kingdom: Animalia
- Phylum: Arthropoda
- Class: Insecta
- Order: Lepidoptera
- Superfamily: Noctuoidea
- Family: Erebidae
- Subfamily: Arctiinae
- Genus: Eutane
- Species: E. trimochla

Binomial name
- Eutane trimochla Turner, 1940

Species of moth

Eutane trimochla is a moth of the subfamily Arctiinae. It was described by Alfred Jefferis Turner in 1940. It is known from Queensland, Australia.
