= Thallarcha macilenta =

Scientific classification
- Domain: Eukaryota
- Kingdom: Animalia
- Phylum: Arthropoda
- Class: Insecta
- Order: Lepidoptera
- Superfamily: Noctuoidea
- Family: Erebidae
- Subfamily: Arctiinae
- Genus: Thallarcha
- Species: T. macilenta

Binomial name
- Thallarcha macilenta (T. P. Lucas, 1894)

Synonyms
- Nudaria macilenta T. P. Lucas, 1894

Species of moth

Thallarcha macilenta is a moth in the subfamily Arctiinae. It was described by Thomas Pennington Lucas in 1894. It is found in Australia, where it has been recorded from New South Wales and Queensland.

The wingspan is about 20 mm. The forewings are white with black zigzag markings. The hindwings are also white.
