= Hectobrocha pentacyma =

Scientific classification
- Kingdom: Animalia
- Phylum: Arthropoda
- Class: Insecta
- Order: Lepidoptera
- Superfamily: Noctuoidea
- Family: Erebidae
- Subfamily: Arctiinae
- Genus: Hectobrocha
- Species: H. pentacyma

Binomial name
- Hectobrocha pentacyma Meyrick, 1886

Species of moth

Hectobrocha pentacyma, the five-banded footman, is a moth of the subfamily Arctiinae. It was described by Edward Meyrick in 1886. It is found in the Australian states of Queensland, New South Wales and Victoria.
