= Eutane terminalis =

Scientific classification
- Kingdom: Animalia
- Phylum: Arthropoda
- Class: Insecta
- Order: Lepidoptera
- Superfamily: Noctuoidea
- Family: Erebidae
- Subfamily: Arctiinae
- Genus: Eutane
- Species: E. terminalis

Binomial name
- Eutane terminalis Walker, 1854

Synonyms
- Eutane maculata Butler, 1877; Comarchis gradata Lucas, 1890

Species of moth

Eutane terminalis, the banded lichen moth, is a moth of the subfamily Arctiinae. It was described by Francis Walker in 1854. It is known from the Australian states of Queensland and New South Wales.

The wingspan is about 15 mm. Adults are black and yellow.

The larvae feed on lichen. They are dark grey and yellow and reach a length of about 15 mm when full grown. They live communally.
