= Chrysomesia lophoptera =

Scientific classification
- Domain: Eukaryota
- Kingdom: Animalia
- Phylum: Arthropoda
- Class: Insecta
- Order: Lepidoptera
- Superfamily: Noctuoidea
- Family: Erebidae
- Subfamily: Arctiinae
- Genus: Chrysomesia
- Species: C. lophoptera

Binomial name
- Chrysomesia lophoptera (Turner, 1940)

Synonyms
- Heterallactis lophoptera Turner, 1940

Species of moth

Chrysomesia lophoptera is a moth of the family Erebidae first described by Alfred Jefferis Turner in 1940. It is found in Queensland, Australia.
