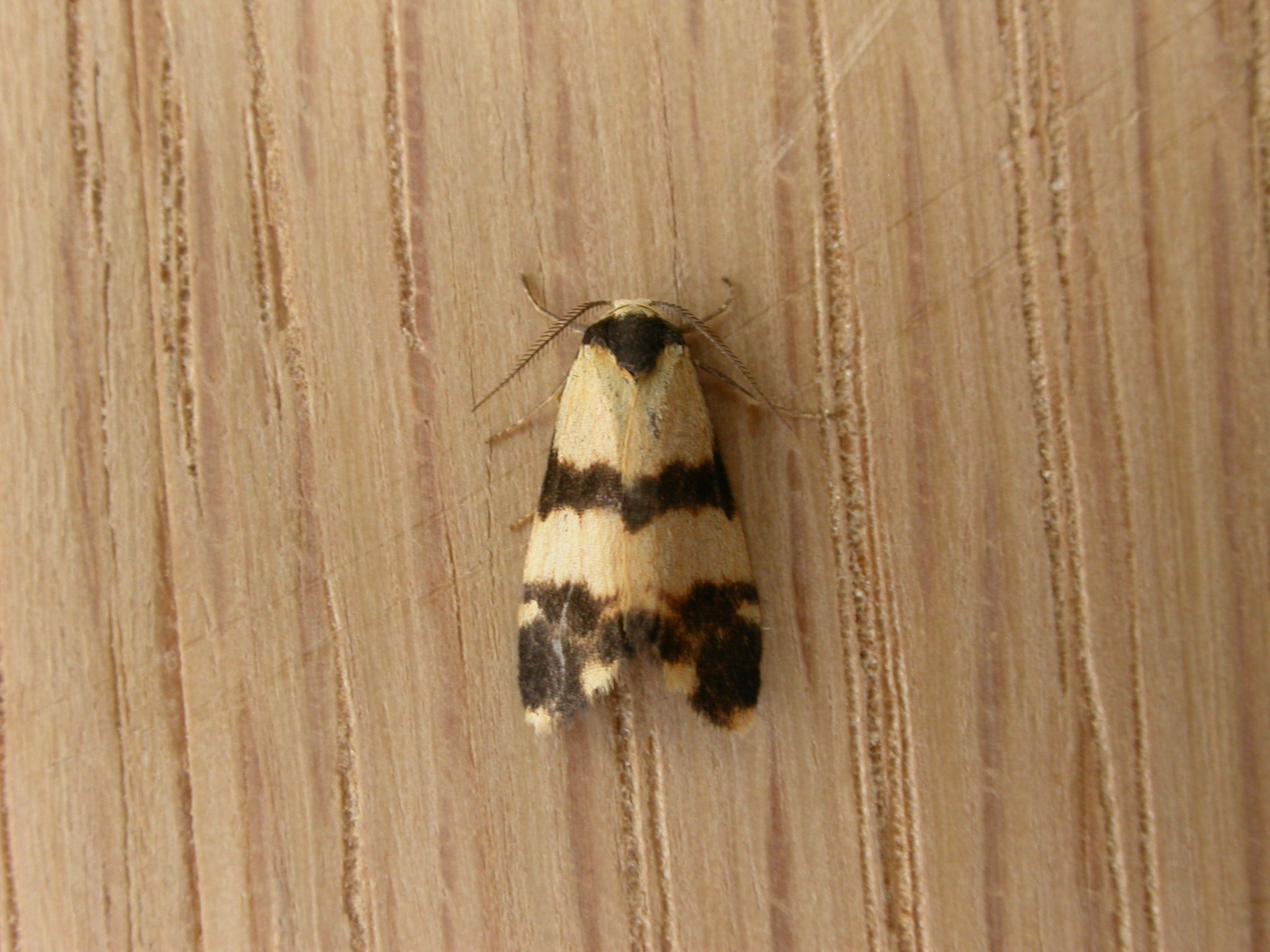

Scientific classification
- Kingdom: Animalia
- Phylum: Arthropoda
- Class: Insecta
- Order: Lepidoptera
- Superfamily: Noctuoidea
- Family: Erebidae
- Subfamily: Arctiinae
- Genus: Thallarcha
- Species: T. chrysochares

Binomial name
- Thallarcha chrysochares Meyrick, 1886

= Thallarcha chrysochares =

Species of moth

Thallarcha chrysochares is a species of moth of the subfamily Arctiinae first described by Edward Meyrick in 1886. It is found in Australia.
