= Thallarcha epigypsa =

Scientific classification
- Domain: Eukaryota
- Kingdom: Animalia
- Phylum: Arthropoda
- Class: Insecta
- Order: Lepidoptera
- Superfamily: Noctuoidea
- Family: Erebidae
- Subfamily: Arctiinae
- Genus: Thallarcha
- Species: T. epigypsa

Binomial name
- Thallarcha epigypsa (Lower, 1902)

Synonyms
- Comarchis epigypsa Lower, 1902

Species of moth

Thallarcha epigypsa is a moth in the subfamily Arctiinae. It was described by Oswald Bertram Lower in 1902. It is found in Australia, where it has been recorded from South Australia.
