= Thallarcha staurocola =

Scientific classification
- Kingdom: Animalia
- Phylum: Arthropoda
- Class: Insecta
- Order: Lepidoptera
- Superfamily: Noctuoidea
- Family: Erebidae
- Subfamily: Arctiinae
- Genus: Thallarcha
- Species: T. staurocola

Binomial name
- Thallarcha staurocola (Meyrick, 1886)

Synonyms
- Comarchis staurocola Meyrick, 1886

Species of moth

Thallarcha staurocola is a moth in the subfamily Arctiinae. It was described by Edward Meyrick in 1886. It is found in Australia, where it has been recorded from New South Wales, Queensland and Victoria.
