= Goniosema euraphota =

Scientific classification
- Domain: Eukaryota
- Kingdom: Animalia
- Phylum: Arthropoda
- Class: Insecta
- Order: Lepidoptera
- Superfamily: Noctuoidea
- Family: Erebidae
- Subfamily: Arctiinae
- Genus: Goniosema
- Species: G. euraphota

Binomial name
- Goniosema euraphota Turner, 1940

Synonyms
- Licnoptera euraphota

Species of moth

Goniosema euraphota is a moth of the subfamily Arctiinae. It was described by Alfred Jefferis Turner in 1940. It is found in Australia, where it has been recorded from Queensland.
