= Thallarcha chrysochoa =

Scientific classification
- Kingdom: Animalia
- Phylum: Arthropoda
- Class: Insecta
- Order: Lepidoptera
- Superfamily: Noctuoidea
- Family: Erebidae
- Subfamily: Arctiinae
- Genus: Thallarcha
- Species: T. chrysochoa

Binomial name
- Thallarcha chrysochoa (Meyrick, 1886)

Synonyms
- Comarchis chrysochoa Meyrick, 1886

Species of moth

Thallarcha chrysochoa, the golden footman, is a moth in the subfamily Arctiinae. It was described by Edward Meyrick in 1886. It is found in Australia, where it has been recorded from the Australian Capital Territory, New South Wales and Victoria.
