= Thallarcha catasticta =

Scientific classification
- Domain: Eukaryota
- Kingdom: Animalia
- Phylum: Arthropoda
- Class: Insecta
- Order: Lepidoptera
- Superfamily: Noctuoidea
- Family: Erebidae
- Subfamily: Arctiinae
- Genus: Thallarcha
- Species: T. catasticta

Binomial name
- Thallarcha catasticta Lower, 1915

Species of moth

Thallarcha catasticta, the four-lined footman, is a moth in the subfamily Arctiinae. It was described by Oswald Bertram Lower in 1915. It is found in Australia, where it has been recorded from New South Wales, South Australia, Victoria and Western Australia.
