= Hesychopa molybdica =

Scientific classification
- Domain: Eukaryota
- Kingdom: Animalia
- Phylum: Arthropoda
- Class: Insecta
- Order: Lepidoptera
- Superfamily: Noctuoidea
- Family: Erebidae
- Subfamily: Arctiinae
- Genus: Hesychopa
- Species: H. molybdica

Binomial name
- Hesychopa molybdica Turner, 1940

Species of moth

Hesychopa molybdica is a moth of the subfamily Arctiinae. It was described by Alfred Jefferis Turner in 1940. It is found in Australia, where it has been recorded from Queensland.
