= Amata lucta =

Scientific classification
- Domain: Eukaryota
- Kingdom: Animalia
- Phylum: Arthropoda
- Class: Insecta
- Order: Lepidoptera
- Superfamily: Noctuoidea
- Family: Erebidae
- Subfamily: Arctiinae
- Genus: Amata
- Species: A. lucta

Binomial name
- Amata lucta (H. Lucas, 1901)

Synonyms
- Syntomis lucta H. Lucas, 1901

Species of moth

Amata lucta is a species of moth of the family Erebidae first described by Hippolyte Lucas in 1901. It is found in Australia.
