= Thallarcha levis =

Scientific classification
- Domain: Eukaryota
- Kingdom: Animalia
- Phylum: Arthropoda
- Class: Insecta
- Order: Lepidoptera
- Superfamily: Noctuoidea
- Family: Erebidae
- Subfamily: Arctiinae
- Genus: Thallarcha
- Species: T. levis

Binomial name
- Thallarcha levis Turner, 1943

Species of moth

Thallarcha levis is a moth in the subfamily Arctiinae. It was described by Alfred Jefferis Turner in 1943. It is found in Australia, where it has been recorded from the Northern Territory and Queensland.

The wingspan is about 15 mm.
