= Threnosia hypopolia =

Scientific classification
- Domain: Eukaryota
- Kingdom: Animalia
- Phylum: Arthropoda
- Class: Insecta
- Order: Lepidoptera
- Superfamily: Noctuoidea
- Family: Erebidae
- Subfamily: Arctiinae
- Genus: Threnosia
- Species: T. hypopolia

Binomial name
- Threnosia hypopolia Turner, 1940

Species of moth

Threnosia hypopolia, the dull footman, is a moth in the subfamily Arctiinae. It was described by Alfred Jefferis Turner in 1940. It is found in Australia, where it has been recorded from Victoria.

The wingspan is about 20 mm. The forewings are brown and the hindwings are paler brown.
