= Symmetrodes sciocosma =

Scientific classification
- Kingdom: Animalia
- Phylum: Arthropoda
- Class: Insecta
- Order: Lepidoptera
- Superfamily: Noctuoidea
- Family: Erebidae
- Subfamily: Arctiinae
- Genus: Symmetrodes
- Species: S. sciocosma

Binomial name
- Symmetrodes sciocosma Meyrick, 1888

Synonyms
- Asura ectophaea Hampson, 1900; Asura atrifusa Hampson, 1900; Asura reducta Draudt, 1914 (nec Rothschild, 1913); Asura reductana Strand, 1922

Species of moth

Symmetrodes sciocosma is a moth belonging to the subfamily Arctiinae. It was first described by Edward Meyrick in 1888. This species is native to Australia, specifically found in the Northern Territory, Queensland and New South Wales.

The wingspan of this species measures approximately 20 mm. Its forewings display a brown coloration with yellow veins and edges.
