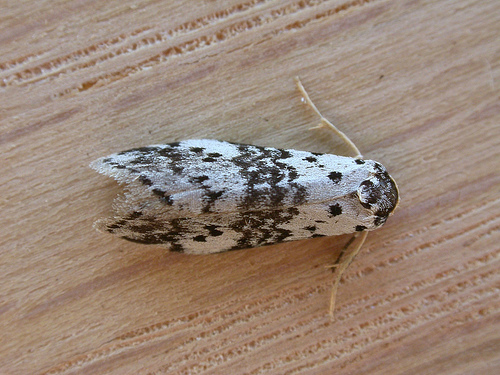
- Dorsal view
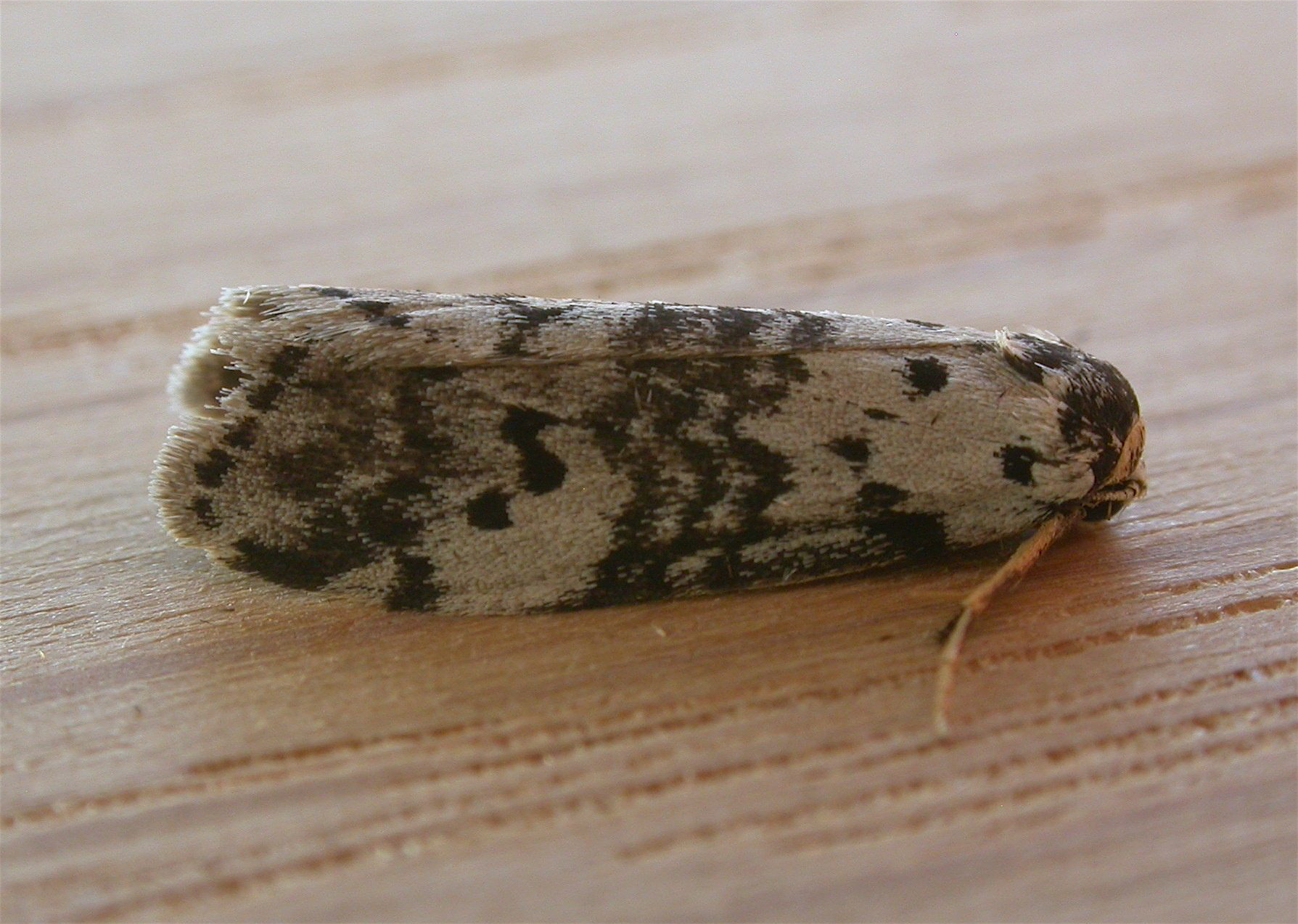
- Side view

Scientific classification
- Kingdom: Animalia
- Phylum: Arthropoda
- Class: Insecta
- Order: Lepidoptera
- Superfamily: Noctuoidea
- Family: Erebidae
- Subfamily: Arctiinae
- Genus: Thallarcha
- Species: T. fusa

Binomial name
- Thallarcha fusa Hampson, 1900

= Thallarcha fusa =

Species of moth

Thallarcha fusa is a species of moth of the subfamily Arctiinae. It was first described by George Hampson in 1900 and it is found in Australia.
