= Thallarcha jocularis =

Scientific classification
- Domain: Eukaryota
- Kingdom: Animalia
- Phylum: Arthropoda
- Class: Insecta
- Order: Lepidoptera
- Superfamily: Noctuoidea
- Family: Erebidae
- Subfamily: Arctiinae
- Genus: Thallarcha
- Species: T. jocularis

Binomial name
- Thallarcha jocularis (Rosenstock, 1885)

Synonyms
- Mosoda jocularis Rosenstock, 1885

Species of moth

Thallarcha jocularis is a moth of the subfamily Arctiinae first described by Rudolph Rosenstock in 1885. It is found in the Australian states of New South Wales and Victoria.
