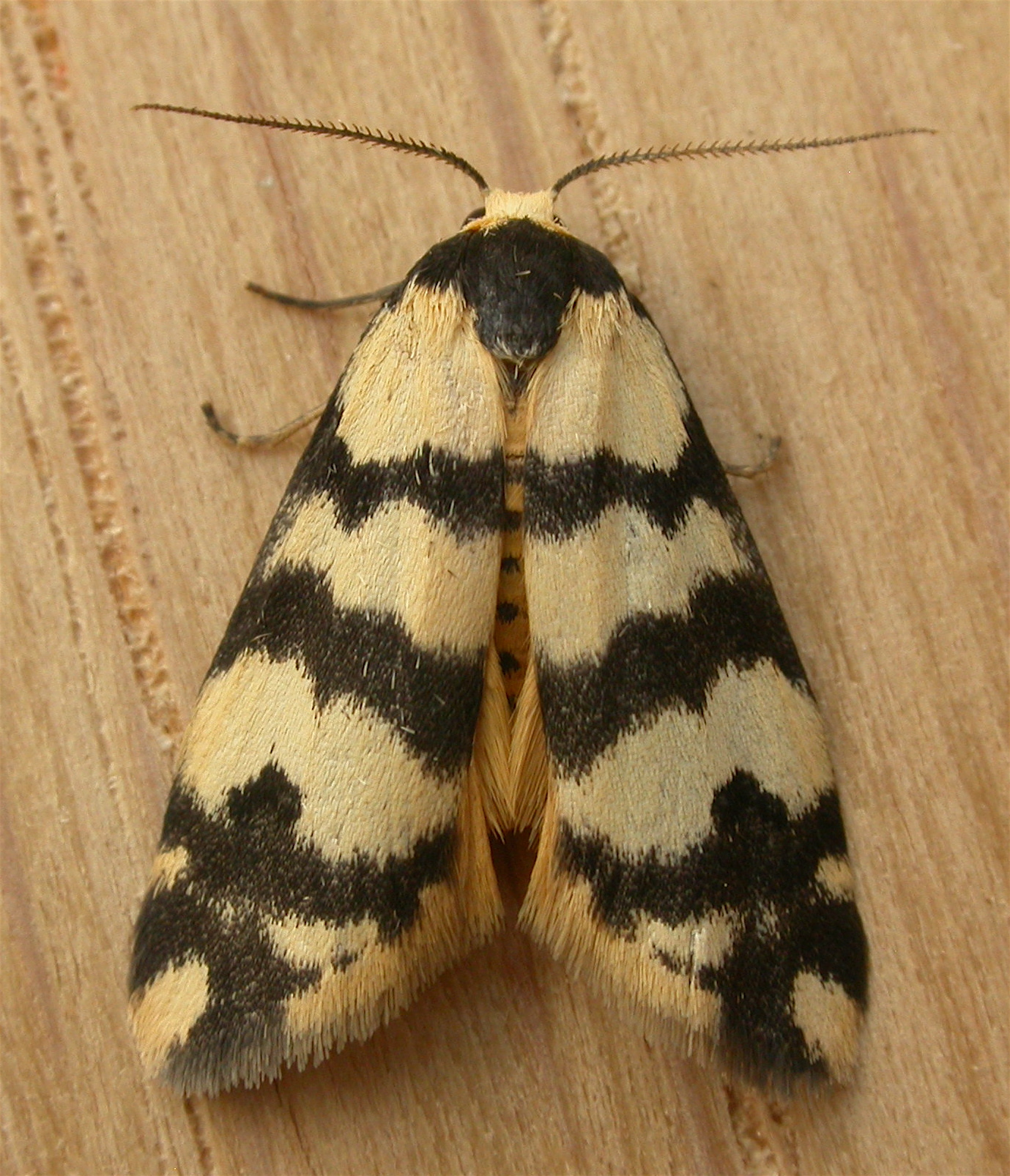

Scientific classification
- Kingdom: Animalia
- Phylum: Arthropoda
- Class: Insecta
- Order: Lepidoptera
- Superfamily: Noctuoidea
- Family: Erebidae
- Subfamily: Arctiinae
- Genus: Thallarcha
- Species: T. partita

Binomial name
- Thallarcha partita Walker, 1869

Synonyms
- Pitane amanda

= Thallarcha partita =

Species of moth

Thallarcha partita is a moth of the subfamily Arctiinae first described by Francis Walker in 1869. It is found in the Australian states of New South Wales, Queensland and Victoria.

The wingspan is about 15 mm.
