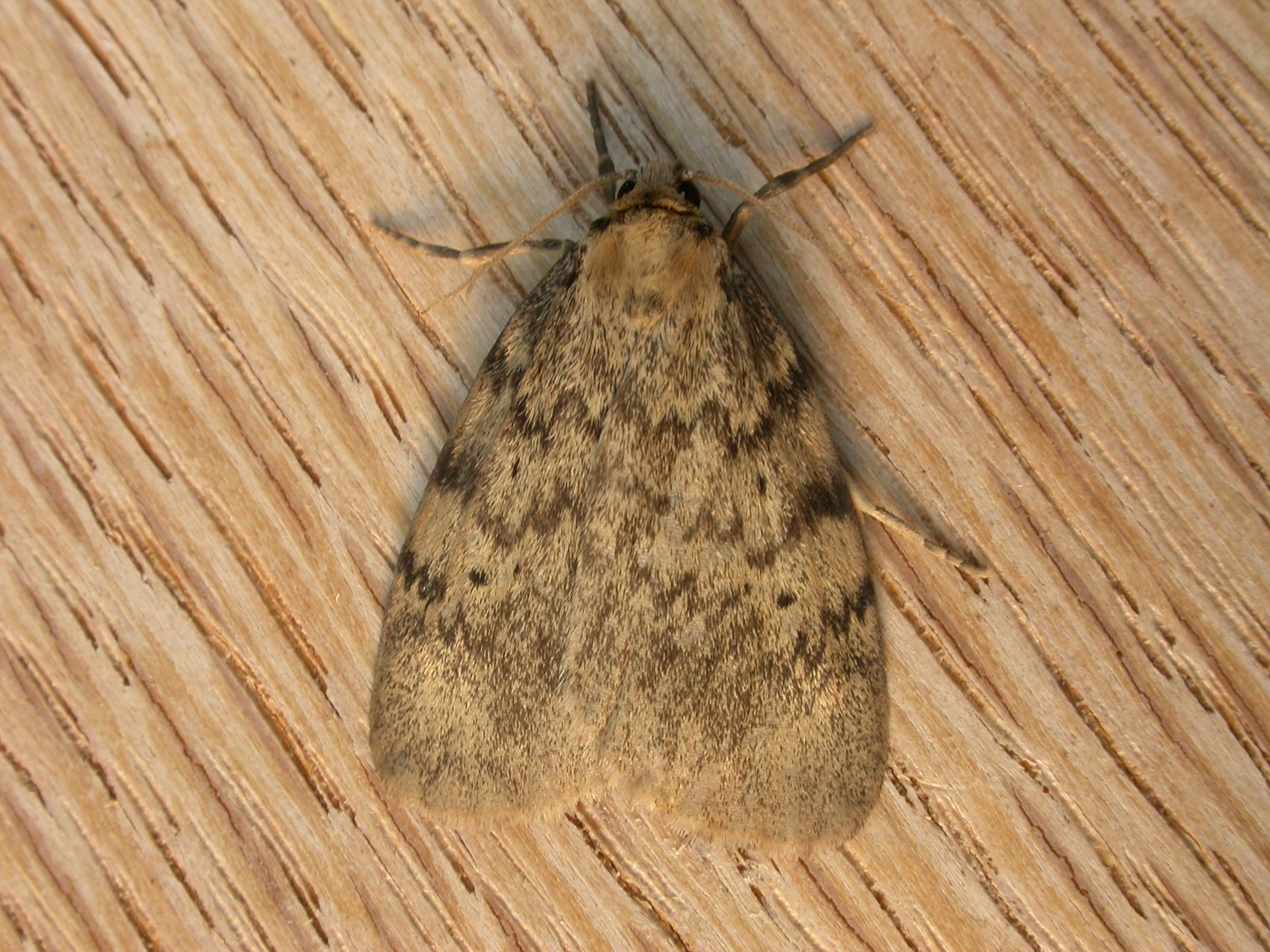

Scientific classification
- Kingdom: Animalia
- Phylum: Arthropoda
- Class: Insecta
- Order: Lepidoptera
- Superfamily: Noctuoidea
- Family: Erebidae
- Subfamily: Arctiinae
- Genus: Hectobrocha
- Species: H. adoxa

Binomial name
- Hectobrocha adoxa (Meyrick, 1886)

Synonyms
- Neobrocha adoxa Meyrick, 1886

= Hectobrocha adoxa =

Species of moth

Hectobrocha adoxa, the unadorned footman, is a species of moth of the subfamily Arctiinae first described by Edward Meyrick in 1886. It is known from the Australian states of New South Wales and Victoria.

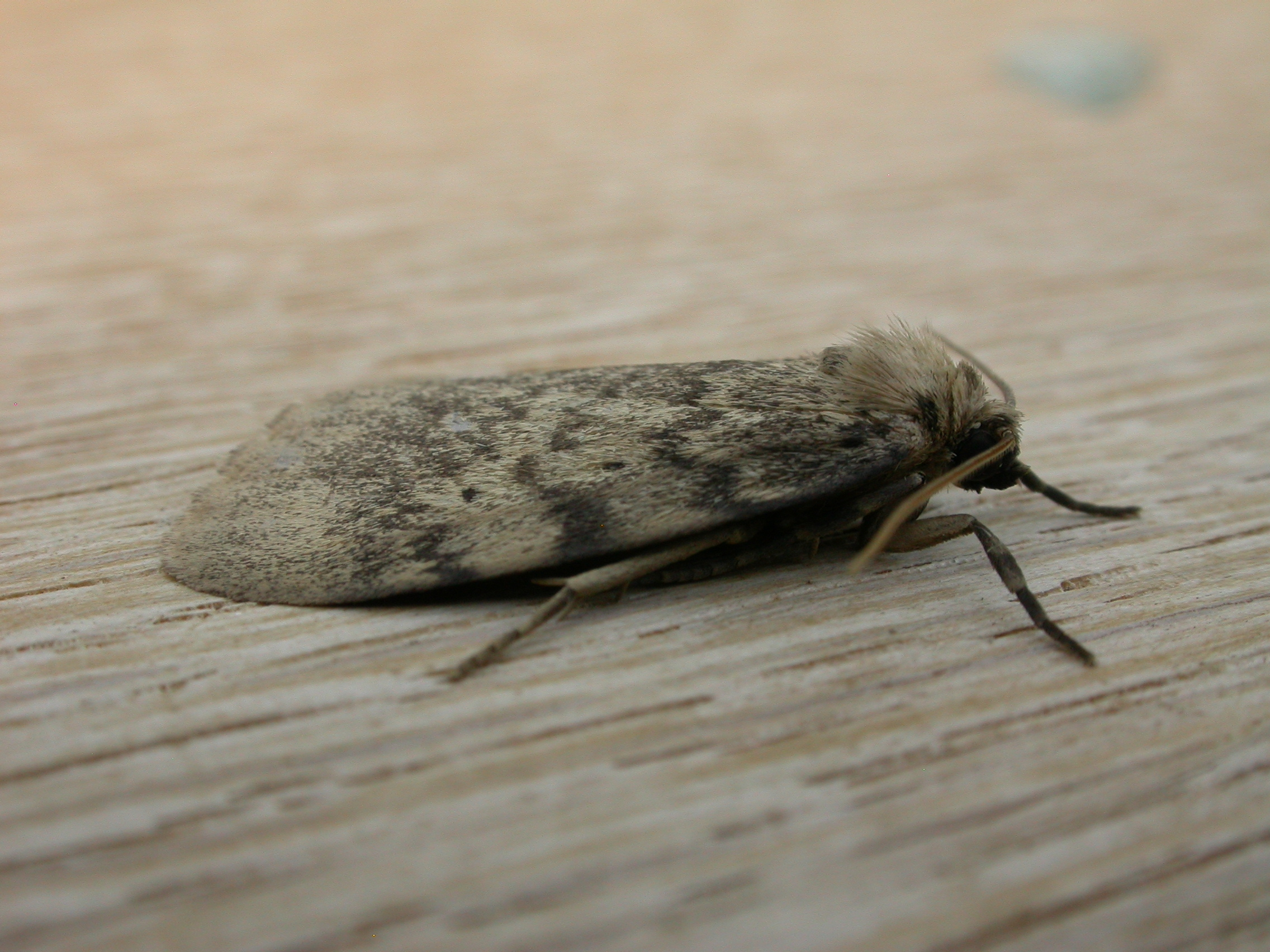
