= Threnosia agraphes =

Scientific classification
- Domain: Eukaryota
- Kingdom: Animalia
- Phylum: Arthropoda
- Class: Insecta
- Order: Lepidoptera
- Superfamily: Noctuoidea
- Family: Erebidae
- Subfamily: Arctiinae
- Genus: Threnosia
- Species: T. agraphes

Binomial name
- Threnosia agraphes Turner, 1940

Species of moth

Threnosia agraphes is a moth in the subfamily Arctiinae. It was described by Alfred Jefferis Turner in 1940. It is found in Australia, where it has been recorded from Victoria.
