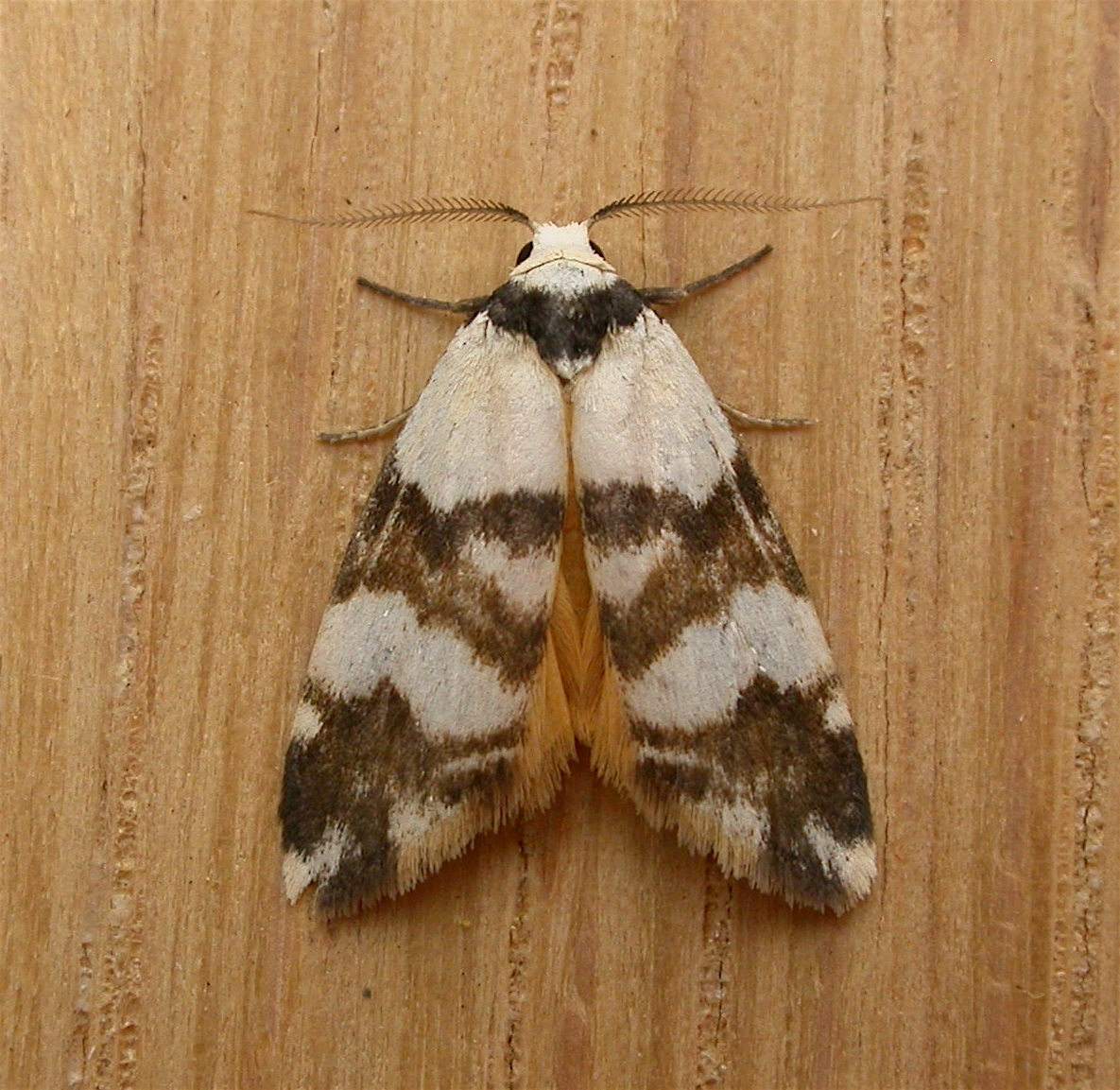

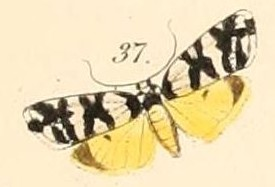

Scientific classification
- Domain: Eukaryota
- Kingdom: Animalia
- Phylum: Arthropoda
- Class: Insecta
- Order: Lepidoptera
- Superfamily: Noctuoidea
- Family: Erebidae
- Subfamily: Arctiinae
- Genus: Thallarcha
- Species: T. albicollis

Binomial name
- Thallarcha albicollis R. Felder & Rogenhofer, 1875

Synonyms
- Pitane albicollis Felder & Rogenhofer, 1875

= Thallarcha albicollis =

Species of moth

Thallarcha albicollis is a moth of the subfamily Arctiinae first described by Rudolf Felder and Alois Friedrich Rogenhofer in 1875. It is found in Australia, including Tasmania.
