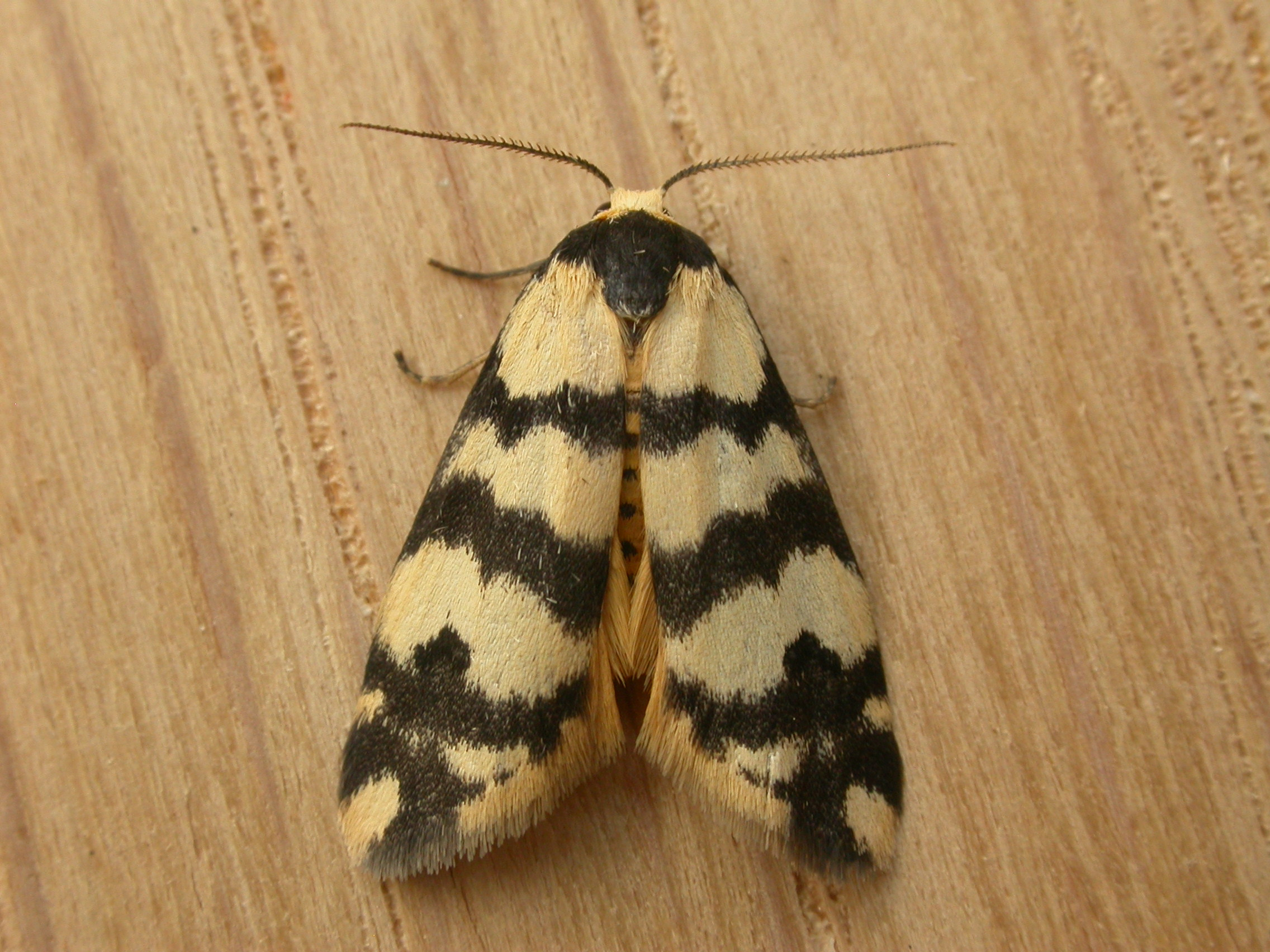

Scientific classification
- Kingdom: Animalia
- Phylum: Arthropoda
- Clade: Pancrustacea
- Class: Insecta
- Order: Lepidoptera
- Superfamily: Noctuoidea
- Family: Erebidae
- Subfamily: Arctiinae
- Genus: Thallarcha
- Species: T. trissomochla

Binomial name
- Thallarcha trissomochla Turner, 1940

= Thallarcha trissomochla =

Species of moth

Thallarcha trissomochla is a moth of the subfamily Arctiinae first described by Alfred Jefferis Turner in 1940. It is found from Townsville in Queensland to northern New South Wales.
