= Hesychopa chionora =

Scientific classification
- Kingdom: Animalia
- Phylum: Arthropoda
- Class: Insecta
- Order: Lepidoptera
- Superfamily: Noctuoidea
- Family: Erebidae
- Subfamily: Arctiinae
- Genus: Hesychopa
- Species: H. chionora

Binomial name
- Hesychopa chionora (Meyrick, 1886)

Synonyms
- Lithosia chionora Meyrick, 1886; Apistosia chionora

Species of moth

Hesychopa chionora, the white footman, is an Australian moth of the subfamily Arctiinae. It was described by Edward Meyrick in 1886. It lives in Victoria, Queensland and New South Wales.
