= Symmetrodes platymelas =

Scientific classification
- Domain: Eukaryota
- Kingdom: Animalia
- Phylum: Arthropoda
- Class: Insecta
- Order: Lepidoptera
- Superfamily: Noctuoidea
- Family: Erebidae
- Subfamily: Arctiinae
- Genus: Symmetrodes
- Species: S. platymelas

Binomial name
- Symmetrodes platymelas Turner, 1940

Species of moth

Symmetrodes platymelas is a moth in the subfamily Arctiinae. It was described by Turner in 1940. It is found in Australia.
