= Goniosema anguliscripta =

Scientific classification
- Domain: Eukaryota
- Kingdom: Animalia
- Phylum: Arthropoda
- Class: Insecta
- Order: Lepidoptera
- Superfamily: Noctuoidea
- Family: Erebidae
- Subfamily: Arctiinae
- Genus: Goniosema
- Species: G. anguliscripta

Binomial name
- Goniosema anguliscripta (T. P. Lucas, 1890)

Synonyms
- Chiriphe anguliscripta T. P. Lucas, 1890; Licnoptera anguliscripta

Species of moth

Goniosema anguliscripta is a moth of the subfamily Arctiinae. It was described by Thomas Pennington Lucas in 1890. It is found in Australia, where it has been recorded from New South Wales and Queensland.
