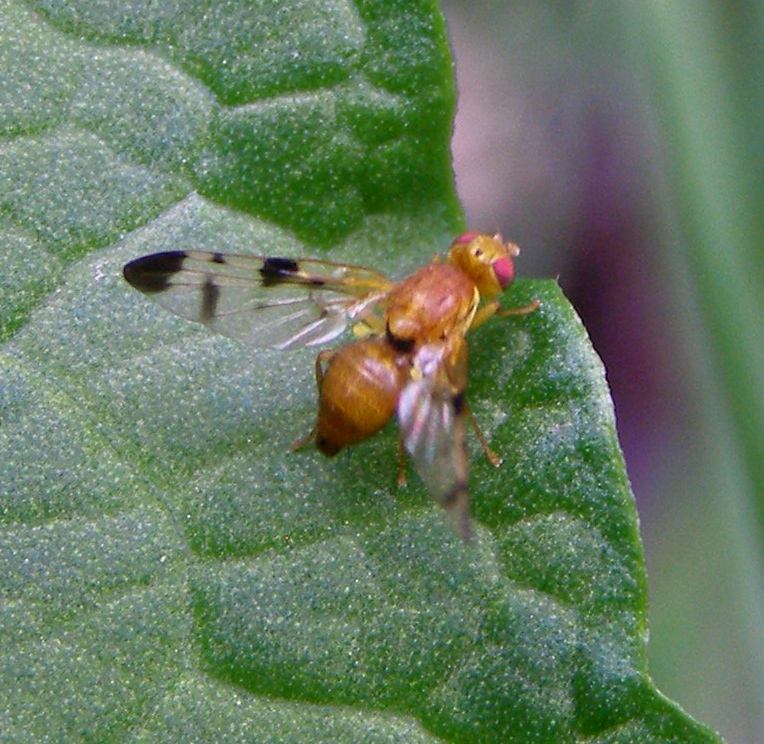
- Female Trypeta zoe

Scientific classification
- Kingdom: Animalia
- Phylum: Arthropoda
- Clade: Pancrustacea
- Class: Insecta
- Order: Diptera
- Family: Tephritidae
- Subfamily: Trypetinae
- Tribe: Trypetini
- Genus: Trypeta; Meigen, 1803

Type species
- Musca artemisiae Fabricius, 1794

Species
- See text

Synonyms
- Forellia Robineau-Desvoidy, 1830; Heliotrypeta Richter & Kandybina, 1985; Phorellia Rondani, 1870; Spilographa Loew, 1862; Tripeta Rondani, 1870; Tyrpeta Giebel, 1852; Spylographa Rondani, 1871

= Trypeta =

Genus of flies

Trypeta is a genus of tephritid, or fruit flies in the family Tephritidae.

== Species ==
- Trypeta aberrans Hardy, 1973
- Trypeta albida Walker, 1853
- Trypeta amanda Hering, 1938
- Trypeta anitra Korneyev, 1997
- Trypeta apicalis (Shinji, 1939)
- Trypeta apicefasciata Hering, 1938
- Trypeta arcifera Hering, 1938
- Trypeta artemisiae (Fabricius, 1794)
- Trypeta basifasciata Richter & Kandybina, 1985
- Trypeta basilaris Wiedemann, 1830
- Trypeta beatifica Ito, 1984
- Trypeta bifasciata Han & Norrbom, 2005
- Trypeta binotata Zia, 1938
- Trypeta bipunctata Portschinsky, 1891
- Trypeta bomiensis Wang, 1996
- Trypeta brevivitta Walker, 1865
- Trypeta buddha Hering, 1942
- Trypeta californiensis Han & Norrbom, 2005
- Trypeta caucasia Bigot, 1880
- Trypeta chalybeiventris Wiedemann 1830
- Trypeta chiapasensis Han & Norrbom, 2005
- Trypeta choui Chen, 1948
- Trypeta concolor (Wulp, 1899)
- Trypeta costaricana Han & Norrbom, 2005
- Trypeta cyanogaster Wiedemann, 1830
- Trypeta denticulata Han & Norrbom, 2005
- Trypeta digesta Ito, 1984
- Trypeta diversata Walker, 1865
- Trypeta divisa Walker, 1853
- Trypeta dorsocentralis Richter & Kandybina, 1985
- Trypeta excepta Walker, 1853
- Trypeta ferruginea Walker, 1853
- Trypeta flaveola Coquillett, 1899
- Trypeta flavifasciata Han & Norrbom, 2005
- Trypeta footei Han & Norrbom, 2005
- Trypeta fractura (Coquillett, 1902)
- Trypeta fujianica Wang, 1996
- Trypeta hostilis Hering, 1938
- Trypeta hysia Walker, 1849
- Trypeta immaculata (Macquart, 1835)
- Trypeta impleta Walker, 1859
- Trypeta inclinata Han & Norrbom, 2005
- Trypeta indica (Hendel, 1915)
- Trypeta intermissa Meigen, 1826
- Trypeta itoi Wang, 1996
- Trypeta laeta Walker, 1853
- Trypeta lineata Bezzi, 1913
- Trypeta longiseta Wang, 1996
- Trypeta luteonota Shiraki, 1933
- Trypeta maculata Han & Norrbom, 2005
- Trypeta maculosa (Coquillett, 1899)
- Trypeta mainlingensis Wang, 1996
- Trypeta melanoura Han & Norrbom, 2005
- Trypeta narytia Walker, 1849
- Trypeta novaeboracensis Fitch, 1855
- Trypeta oze Ito, 1984
- Trypeta pantherina Walker, 1853
- Trypeta parallela Walker, 1853
- Trypeta peltigrea Hering, 1938
- Trypeta pictiventris Chen, 1948
- Trypeta pseudozoe Hering, 1938
- Trypeta quadrangulifer Richter & Kandybina, 1985
- Trypeta quaesita Ito, 1984
- Trypeta quinquemaculata Wang, 1996
- Trypeta reducta Han & Norrbom, 2005
- Trypeta rufata (Wulp, 1899)
- Trypeta scutellata Walker, 1853
- Trypeta semipicta (Zia, 1939)
- Trypeta striata (Wulp, 1899)
- Trypeta submicans Zia, 1938
- Trypeta sumptuosa (Hering, 1938)
- Trypeta thoracalis Hendel, 1934
- Trypeta tortile Coquillett, 1894
- Trypeta tortilis Coquillett, 1894
- Trypeta trifasciata Shiraki, 1933
- Trypeta varia Walker, 1853
- Trypeta victrix Hering, 1938
- Trypeta wulpi Han & Norrbom, 2005
- Trypeta xingshana Wang, 1996
- Trypeta yushunica Wang, 1996
- Trypeta zayuensis Wang, 1996
- Trypeta zoe Meigen, 1826

The following are now synonyms:

- Trypeta actinobola: moved to Trupanea
- Trypeta acutangula: moved to Euarestoides
- Trypeta aesia: moved to Campiglossa
- Trypeta argyrocephala: moved to Campiglossa
- Trypeta avala: moved to Euxesta
- Trypeta biflexa: moved to Acinia
- Trypeta cincta: moved to Tephritis
- Trypeta cingulata: moved to Rhagoletis
- Trypeta fausta: moved to Rhagoletis
- Trypeta finalis: moved to Neotephritis
- Trypeta flexa: moved to Tritoxa
- Trypeta glauca: moved to Trupanea
- Trypeta grata: moved to Clinotaenia
- Trypeta guttatolimbata: moved to Platensina
- Trypeta indecora: moved to Asimoneura
- Trypeta longipennis: moved to Strauzia
- Trypeta lunifera: moved to Platomma
- Trypeta manto: moved to Rioxa
- Trypeta megacephala: moved to Euarestella
- Trypeta melanura: moved to Acidogona
- Trypeta misakiana: moved to Urophora
- Trypeta mixta: moved to Tephritis
- Trypeta multifasciata: moved to Oedaspis

== Database ==
- Tephritid Workers Database
