= T. laeta =

T. laeta may refer to:

- Termessa laeta, an Australian moth
- Teucholabis laeta, a crane fly
- Thaumaglossa laeta, a skin beetle
- Thienemannimyia laeta, a non-biting midge
- Tithrone laeta, a praying mantis
- Tmesorrhina laeta, a flower chafer
- Trypeta laeta, a fruit fly
