= T. albida =

T. albida may refer to:

- Terminalia albida, a tree species found in West Africa
- Tillandsia albida, a plant species endemic to Mexico
- Trypeta albida, a fruit fly species
