= A. aurata =

A. aurata may refer to:

- Acalolepta aurata, a species of longhorn beetle
- Acinia aurata, a species of fruit fly
- Acrodipsas aurata, a species of butterfly
- Admontia aurata, a species of tachinid fly
- Adoxophyes aurata, a species of leafroller moth
- Alchemilla aurata, a species of plant
- Allocosa aurata, a species of wolf spider
- Allocota aurata, a species of ground beetle
- Alloxysta aurata, a species of parasitoid wasp
- Amara aurata, a species of ground beetle
- Anadistichona aurata, a species of tachinid fly
- Artemisia aurata, a species of plant
- Artemita aurata, a species of soldier fly
- Atalophlebia aurata, a species of mayfly
- Augochlorella aurata, a species of sweat bee
