= T. ferruginea =

T. ferruginea may refer to:

- Tadorna ferruginea, the ruddy shelduck, a bird species
- Taphronota ferruginea, a grasshopper species
- Trypeta ferruginea, a fruit fly species

== See also ==
- Ferruginea (disambiguation)
