= Asimoneura stroblii =

Scientific classification
- Kingdom: Animalia
- Phylum: Arthropoda
- Class: Insecta
- Order: Diptera
- Family: Tephritidae
- Subfamily: Tephritinae
- Tribe: Myopitini
- Genus: Asimoneura
- Species: A. stroblii

Binomial name
- Asimoneura stroblii Czerny, 1909

Species of fly

Asimoneura stroblii is a species of tephritid or fruit flies in the genus Trypeta of the family Tephritidae.

== Distribution ==
France, Spain.
