= Asimoneura petiolata =

Scientific classification
- Kingdom: Animalia
- Phylum: Arthropoda
- Class: Insecta
- Order: Diptera
- Family: Tephritidae
- Subfamily: Tephritinae
- Tribe: Myopitini
- Genus: Asimoneura
- Species: A. petiolata

Binomial name
- Asimoneura petiolata (Munro, 1931)

Synonyms
- Urophora petiolata Munro, 1931

Species of fly

Asimoneura petiolata is a species of tephritid or fruit flies in the genus Trypeta of the family Tephritidae.

== Distribution ==
South Africa.
