= Asimoneura shirakii =

Scientific classification
- Kingdom: Animalia
- Phylum: Arthropoda
- Class: Insecta
- Order: Diptera
- Family: Tephritidae
- Subfamily: Tephritinae
- Tribe: Myopitini
- Genus: Asimoneura
- Species: A. shirakii

Binomial name
- Asimoneura shirakii (Munro, 1935)

Synonyms
- Euribia shirakii Munro, 1935

Species of fly

Asimoneura shirakii is a species of tephritid or fruit flies in the genus Trypeta of the family Tephritidae.

== Distribution ==
Taiwan.
