= Asimoneura pantomelas =

Scientific classification
- Kingdom: Animalia
- Phylum: Arthropoda
- Clade: Pancrustacea
- Class: Insecta
- Order: Diptera
- Family: Tephritidae
- Subfamily: Tephritinae
- Tribe: Myopitini
- Genus: Asimoneura
- Species: A. pantomelas

Binomial name
- Asimoneura pantomelas (Bezzi, 1926)

Synonyms
- Urophora pantomelas Bezzi, 1926

Species of fly

Asimoneura pantomelas is a species of tephritid or fruit flies in the genus Trypeta of the family Tephritidae.

== Distribution ==
It has been found in Tanzania, Zimbabwe, and South Africa.
