= Asimoneura indecora =

Scientific classification
- Kingdom: Animalia
- Phylum: Arthropoda
- Clade: Pancrustacea
- Class: Insecta
- Order: Diptera
- Family: Tephritidae
- Subfamily: Tephritinae
- Tribe: Myopitini
- Genus: Asimoneura
- Species: A. indecora

Binomial name
- Asimoneura indecora (Loew, 1861)

Synonyms
- Trypeta indecora Loew, 1861

Species of fly

Asimoneura indecora is a species of tephritid or fruit flies in the genus Trypeta of the family Tephritidae.

== Distribution ==
Zimbabwe, South Africa.
