= Euarestella kugleri =

Scientific classification
- Kingdom: Animalia
- Phylum: Arthropoda
- Class: Insecta
- Order: Diptera
- Family: Tephritidae
- Subfamily: Tephritinae
- Tribe: Tephritini
- Genus: Euarestella
- Species: E. kugleri

Binomial name
- Euarestella kugleri Freidberg, 1974

Species of fly

Euarestella kugleri is a species of tephritid or fruit flies in the genus Euarestella of the family Tephritidae.

== Distribution ==
Israel, Egypt.
