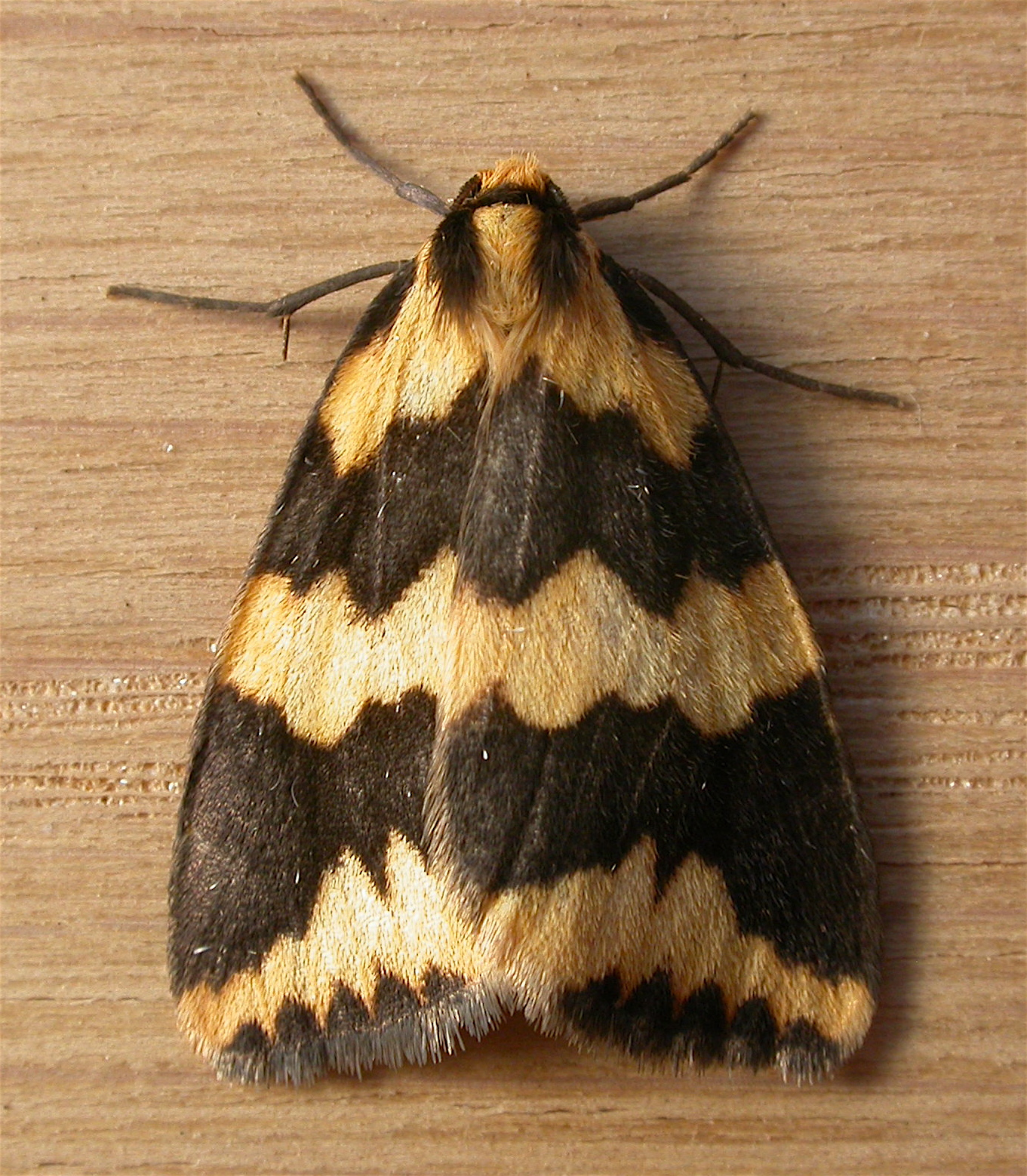

Scientific classification
- Kingdom: Animalia
- Phylum: Arthropoda
- Clade: Pancrustacea
- Class: Insecta
- Order: Lepidoptera
- Superfamily: Noctuoidea
- Family: Erebidae
- Subfamily: Arctiinae
- Genus: Termessa
- Species: T. shepherdi

Binomial name
- Termessa shepherdi Newman, 1856

= Termessa shepherdi =

Species of moth

Termessa shepherdi, the shepherd's footman, is a moth of the subfamily Arctiinae. The species was first described by Newman in 1856. It is found in the Australian states of New South Wales, Victoria and Tasmania.

The wingspan is about 25 mm.
