= Neotephritis quadrata =

Scientific classification
- Kingdom: Animalia
- Phylum: Arthropoda
- Class: Insecta
- Order: Diptera
- Family: Tephritidae
- Subfamily: Tephritinae
- Tribe: Tephritini
- Genus: Neotephritis
- Species: N. quadrata

Binomial name
- Neotephritis quadrata (Malloch, 1933)

Synonyms
- Trypanea quadrata Malloch, 1933

Species of fly

Neotephritis quadrata is a species of tephritid or fruit flies in the genus Neotephritis of the family Tephritidae.

== Distribution ==
Brazil, Uruguay.
