= Platomma nigrantior =

Scientific classification
- Kingdom: Animalia
- Phylum: Arthropoda
- Class: Insecta
- Order: Diptera
- Family: Tephritidae
- Subfamily: Tephritinae
- Tribe: Tephrellini
- Genus: Platomma
- Species: P. nigrantior

Binomial name
- Platomma nigrantior Munro, 1963

Species of fly

Platomma nigrantior is a species of tephritid or fruit flies in the genus Platomma of the family Tephritidae.

== Distribution ==
South Africa.
