= Trypeta tortile =

Scientific classification
- Kingdom: Animalia
- Phylum: Arthropoda
- Class: Insecta
- Order: Diptera
- Family: Tephritidae
- Genus: Trypeta
- Species: T. tortile

Binomial name
- Trypeta tortile Coquillett, 1894

Synonyms
- Trypeta angustigena Foote, 1960

Species of fly

Trypeta tortile is a species of tephritid or fruit flies in the genus Trypeta of the family Tephritidae.

== Distribution ==
Canada & United States.
