= Euarestoides bimaculatus =

Scientific classification
- Kingdom: Animalia
- Phylum: Arthropoda
- Class: Insecta
- Order: Diptera
- Family: Tephritidae
- Subfamily: Tephritinae
- Tribe: Tephritini
- Genus: Euarestoides
- Species: E. bimaculatus

Binomial name
- Euarestoides bimaculatus Savaris & Norrbom, 2019

Species of fruit fly

Euarestoides bimaculatus is a species of fruit fly in the family Tephritidae.

== Distribution ==
Peru.
