= Neotephritis mundelli =

Scientific classification
- Kingdom: Animalia
- Phylum: Arthropoda
- Clade: Pancrustacea
- Class: Insecta
- Order: Diptera
- Family: Tephritidae
- Subfamily: Tephritinae
- Tribe: Tephritini
- Genus: Neotephritis
- Species: N. mundelli

Binomial name
- Neotephritis mundelli (Lima, 1936)

Synonyms
- Acanthiophilus mundellii Hering, 1942; Neotephritis mundellii Foote, 1967; Tephritis mundelli Lima, 1936

Species of fly

Neotephritis mundelli is a species of tephritid or fruit flies in the genus Neotephritis of the family Tephritidae.

== Distribution ==
Brazil.
