= Rioxa manto =

Scientific classification
- Kingdom: Animalia
- Phylum: Arthropoda
- Clade: Pancrustacea
- Class: Insecta
- Order: Diptera
- Family: Tephritidae
- Genus: Rioxa
- Species: R. manto

Binomial name
- Rioxa manto (Osten Sacken, 1882)

Species of fly

Rioxa manto is a species of tephritid or fruit flies in the genus Trypeta of the family Tephritidae.
