= Euarestella iphionae =

Scientific classification
- Kingdom: Animalia
- Phylum: Arthropoda
- Class: Insecta
- Order: Diptera
- Family: Tephritidae
- Subfamily: Tephritinae
- Tribe: Tephritini
- Genus: Euarestella
- Species: E. iphionae

Binomial name
- Euarestella iphionae (Efflatoun, 1924)

Synonyms
- Euaresta iphionae Efflatoun, 1924; Euarestella iphioniae Foote, 1984

Species of fly

Euarestella iphionae is a species of tephritid or fruit flies in the genus Euarestella of the family Tephritidae.

== Distribution ==
Egypt, Sudan, Israel, Arabia, Iran.
