= Neotephritis thaumasta =

Scientific classification
- Kingdom: Animalia
- Phylum: Arthropoda
- Class: Insecta
- Order: Diptera
- Family: Tephritidae
- Subfamily: Tephritinae
- Tribe: Tephritini
- Genus: Neotephritis
- Species: N. thaumasta

Binomial name
- Neotephritis thaumasta (Hering, 1942)

Synonyms
- Acanthiophilus thaumasta Hering, 1942

Species of fly

Neotephritis thaumasta is a species of tephritid or fruit flies in the genus Neotephritis of the family Tephritidae.

== Distribution ==
Mexico.
