= Euarestella nigra =

Scientific classification
- Kingdom: Animalia
- Phylum: Arthropoda
- Class: Insecta
- Order: Diptera
- Family: Tephritidae
- Subfamily: Tephritinae
- Tribe: Tephritini
- Genus: Euarestella
- Species: E. nigra

Binomial name
- Euarestella nigra Merz, 2008

Species of fly

Euarestella nigra is a species of tephritid or fruit flies in the genus Euarestella of the family Tephritidae.

== Distribution ==
United Arab Emirates.
