= Termessa orthocrossa =

Scientific classification
- Domain: Eukaryota
- Kingdom: Animalia
- Phylum: Arthropoda
- Class: Insecta
- Order: Lepidoptera
- Superfamily: Noctuoidea
- Family: Erebidae
- Subfamily: Arctiinae
- Genus: Termessa
- Species: T. orthocrossa

Binomial name
- Termessa orthocrossa Turner, 1922

Species of moth

Termessa orthocrossa is a moth in the subfamily Arctiinae. It was described by Alfred Jefferis Turner in 1922. It is found in Australia, where it has been recorded from New South Wales and Queensland.
