= Trypeta fractura =

Scientific classification
- Domain: Eukaryota
- Kingdom: Animalia
- Phylum: Arthropoda
- Class: Insecta
- Order: Diptera
- Family: Tephritidae
- Genus: Trypeta
- Species: T. fractura

Binomial name
- Trypeta fractura (Coquillett, 1902)

Synonyms
- Spilographa fractura Coquillett, 1902

Species of fly

Trypeta fractura is a species of fruit fly in the family Tephritidae.
