= Trypeta concolor =

Scientific classification
- Kingdom: Animalia
- Phylum: Arthropoda
- Class: Insecta
- Order: Diptera
- Family: Tephritidae
- Genus: Trypeta
- Species: T. concolor

Binomial name
- Trypeta concolor (Wulp, 1899)

Species of fly

Trypeta concolor is a species of tephritid or fruit flies in the genus Trypeta of the family Tephritidae.
