= Trypeta brevivitta =

Scientific classification
- Kingdom: Animalia
- Phylum: Arthropoda
- Class: Insecta
- Order: Diptera
- Family: Tephritidae
- Genus: Trypeta
- Species: T. brevivitta

Binomial name
- Trypeta brevivitta Walker, 1865

Species of fly

Trypeta brevivitta is a species of tephritid or fruit flies in the genus Trypeta of the family Tephritidae.
