= Neotephritis semifusca =

Scientific classification
- Kingdom: Animalia
- Phylum: Arthropoda
- Class: Insecta
- Order: Diptera
- Family: Tephritidae
- Subfamily: Tephritinae
- Tribe: Tephritini
- Genus: Neotephritis
- Species: N. semifusca

Binomial name
- Neotephritis semifusca (Wulp, 1900)

Synonyms
- Tephritis semifusca Wulp, 1900

Species of fly

Neotephritis semifusca is a species of tephritid or fruit flies in the genus Neotephritis of the family Tephritidae.

== Distribution ==
Mexico.
