= Termessa xanthomelas =

Scientific classification
- Domain: Eukaryota
- Kingdom: Animalia
- Phylum: Arthropoda
- Class: Insecta
- Order: Lepidoptera
- Superfamily: Noctuoidea
- Family: Erebidae
- Subfamily: Arctiinae
- Genus: Termessa
- Species: T. xanthomelas

Binomial name
- Termessa xanthomelas Lower, 1892

Synonyms
- Termessa terpnodes Turner, 1940

Species of moth

Termessa xanthomelas is a moth in the subfamily Arctiinae. It was described by Oswald Bertram Lower in 1892. It is found in Australia, where it has been recorded from the Australian Capital Territory, New South Wales, Queensland, South Australia and Victoria.
