= Termessa discrepans =

Scientific classification
- Kingdom: Animalia
- Phylum: Arthropoda
- Clade: Pancrustacea
- Class: Insecta
- Order: Lepidoptera
- Superfamily: Noctuoidea
- Family: Erebidae
- Subfamily: Arctiinae
- Genus: Termessa
- Species: T. discrepans

Binomial name
- Termessa discrepans Walker, [1865]

Synonyms
- Termessa hamula Felder, 1874

Species of moth

Termessa discrepans is a moth in the subfamily Arctiinae. It was described by Francis Walker in 1865. It is found in Australia, where it has been recorded from the Australian Capital Territory, New South Wales, Queensland and Victoria.
