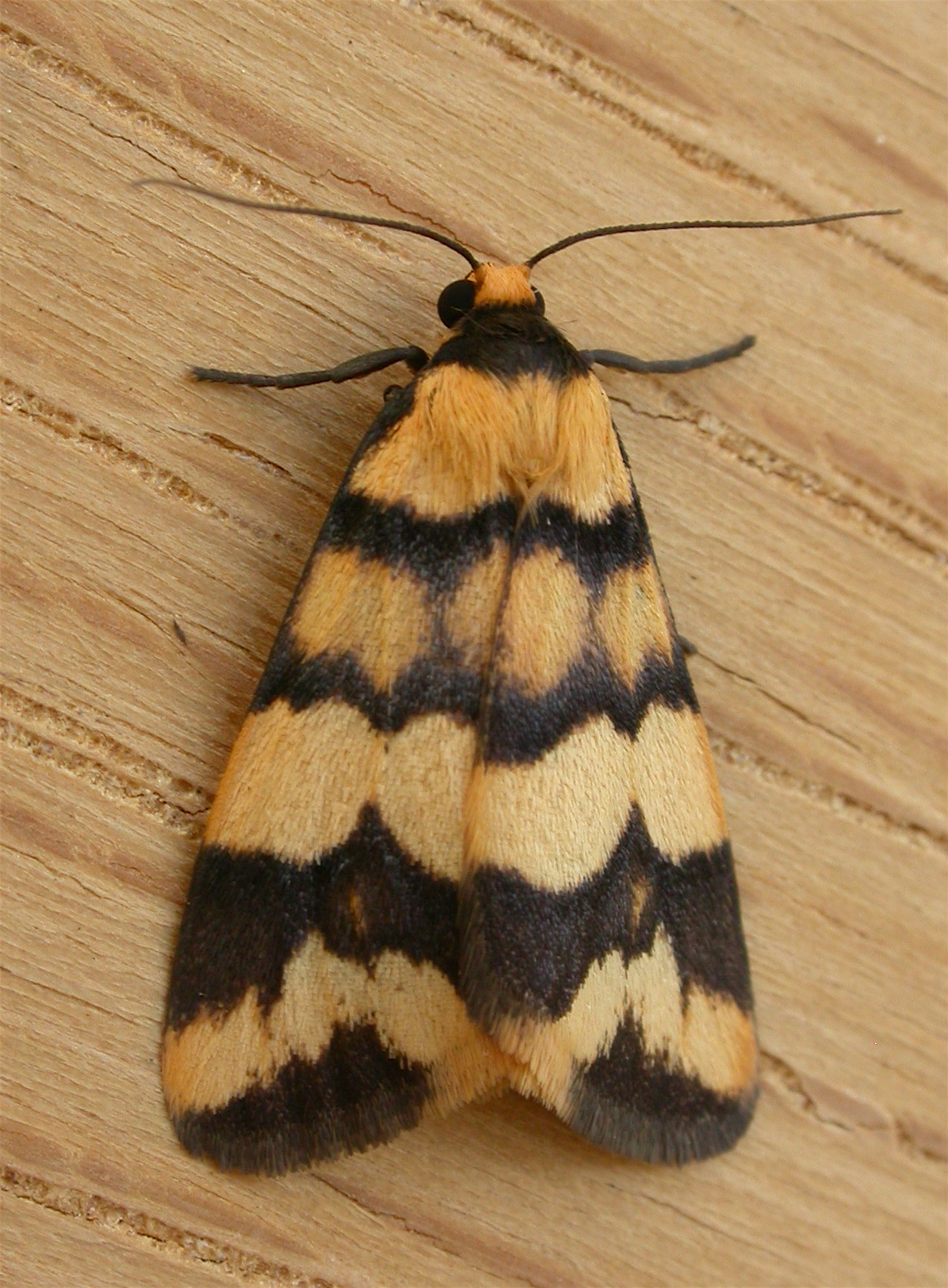

Scientific classification
- Domain: Eukaryota
- Kingdom: Animalia
- Phylum: Arthropoda
- Class: Insecta
- Order: Lepidoptera
- Superfamily: Noctuoidea
- Family: Erebidae
- Subfamily: Arctiinae
- Genus: Termessa
- Species: T. diplographa

Binomial name
- Termessa diplographa Turner, 1899

= Termessa diplographa =

Species of moth

Termessa diplographa is a moth of the subfamily Arctiinae first described by Alfred Jefferis Turner in 1899. It is found in Eastern Australia, often inhabiting forested and open woodlands, as well as heathland habitats. As a lichen moth, the larvae of Termessa diplographa likely feed on lichens that grow on tree trunks.
