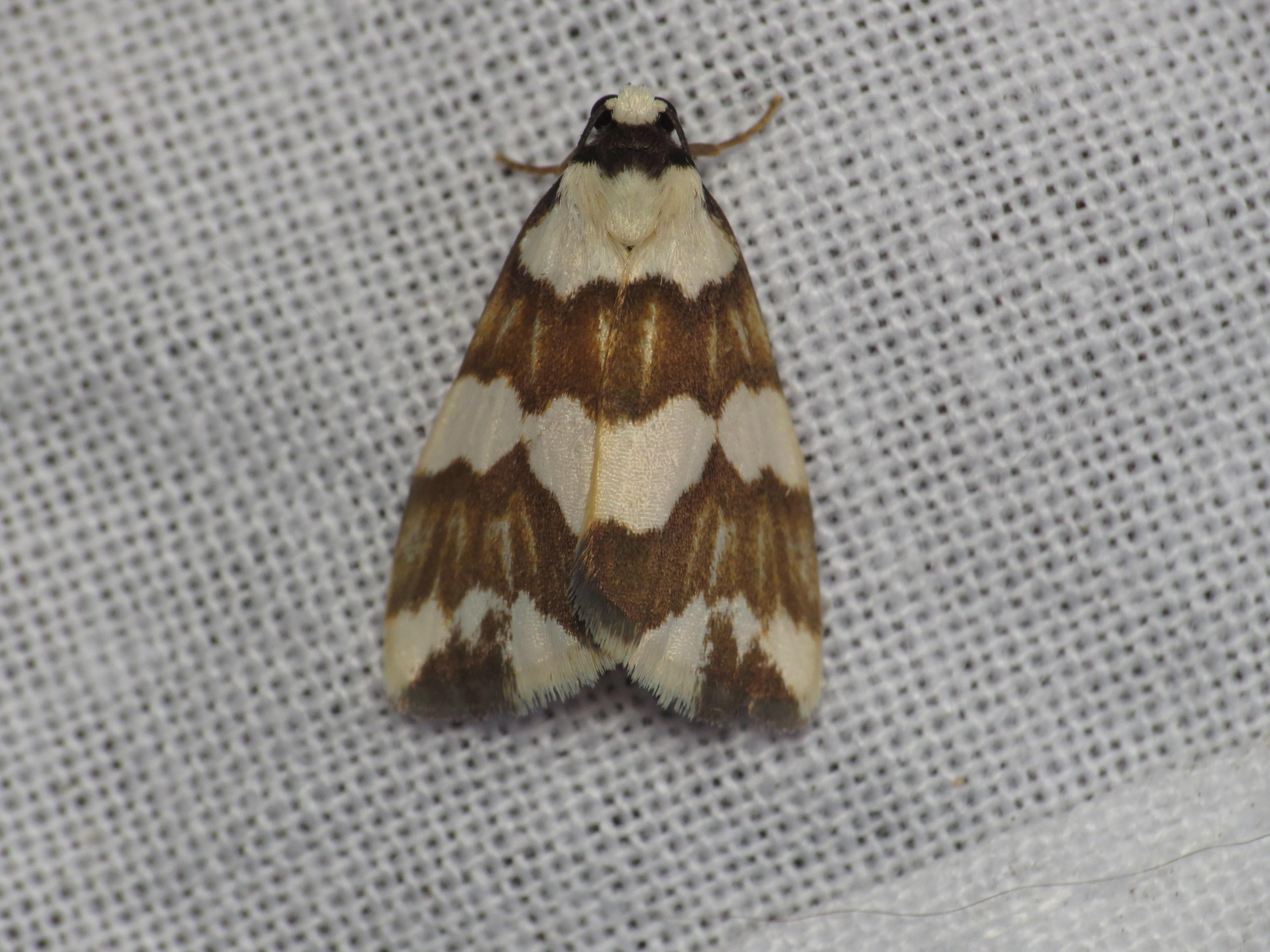
- Termessa gratiosa

Scientific classification
- Kingdom: Animalia
- Phylum: Arthropoda
- Class: Insecta
- Order: Lepidoptera
- Superfamily: Noctuoidea
- Family: Erebidae
- Subfamily: Arctiinae
- Genus: Termessa
- Species: T. gratiosa

Binomial name
- Termessa gratiosa (Walker, [1865])

Synonyms
- Eutane gratiosa Walker, [1865]; Castulo gratiosa

= Termessa gratiosa =

Species of moth

Termessa gratiosa is a moth in the subfamily Arctiinae. It was described by Francis Walker in 1865. It is found in Australia, where it has been recorded from the Australian Capital Territory, New South Wales, Queensland and Victoria.
