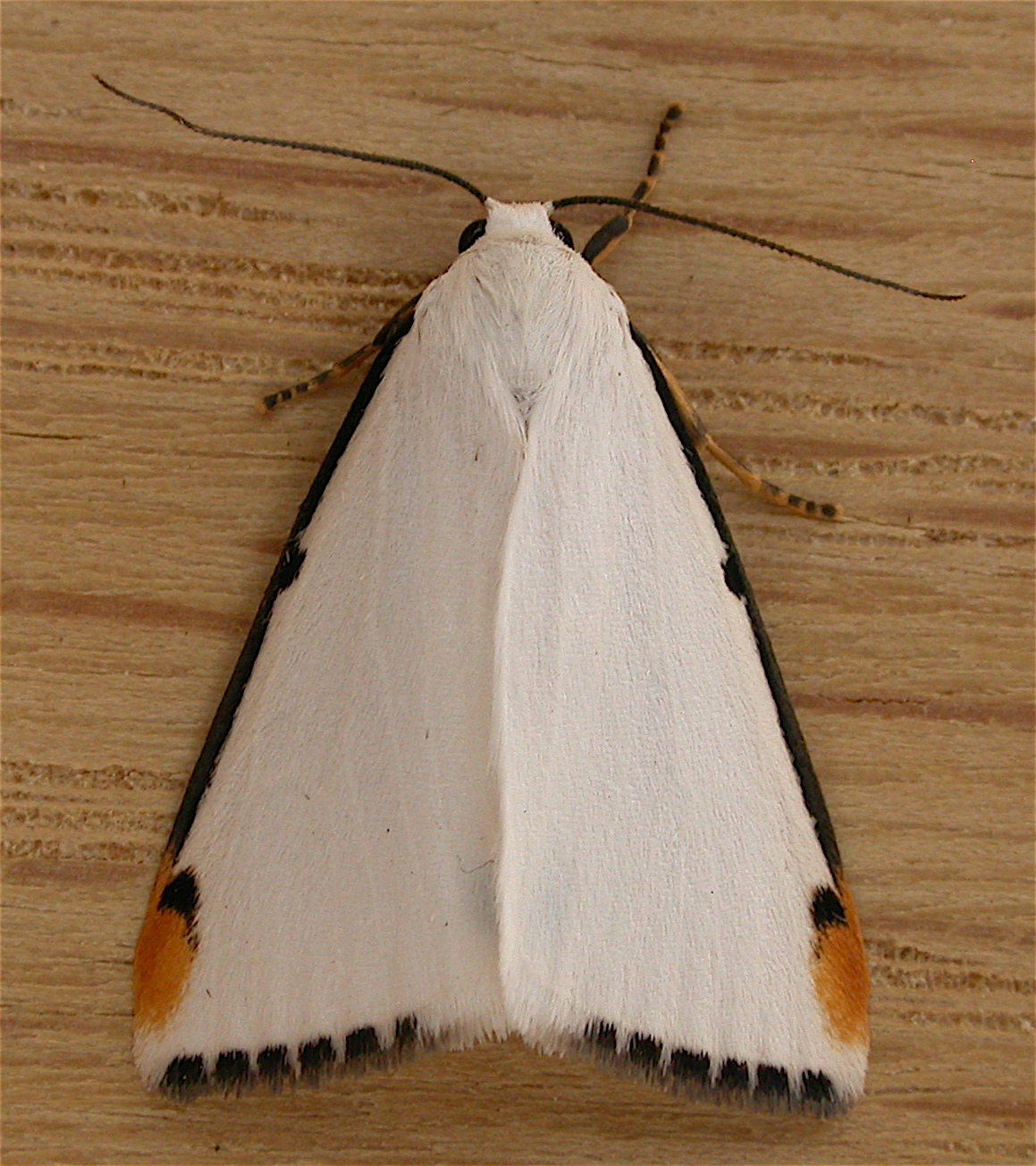

Scientific classification
- Kingdom: Animalia
- Phylum: Arthropoda
- Class: Insecta
- Order: Lepidoptera
- Superfamily: Noctuoidea
- Family: Erebidae
- Subfamily: Arctiinae
- Genus: Termessa
- Species: T. nivosa

Binomial name
- Termessa nivosa (Walker, 1865)

Synonyms
- Lerna nivosa Walker, 1865; Castulo nivosa

= Termessa nivosa =

Species of moth

Termessa nivosa is a moth of the subfamily Arctiinae first described by Francis Walker in 1865. It is found in the Australian states of New South Wales, South Australia and Victoria.

The wingspan is about 25 mm. The larvae feed on lichen, algae and moss.
