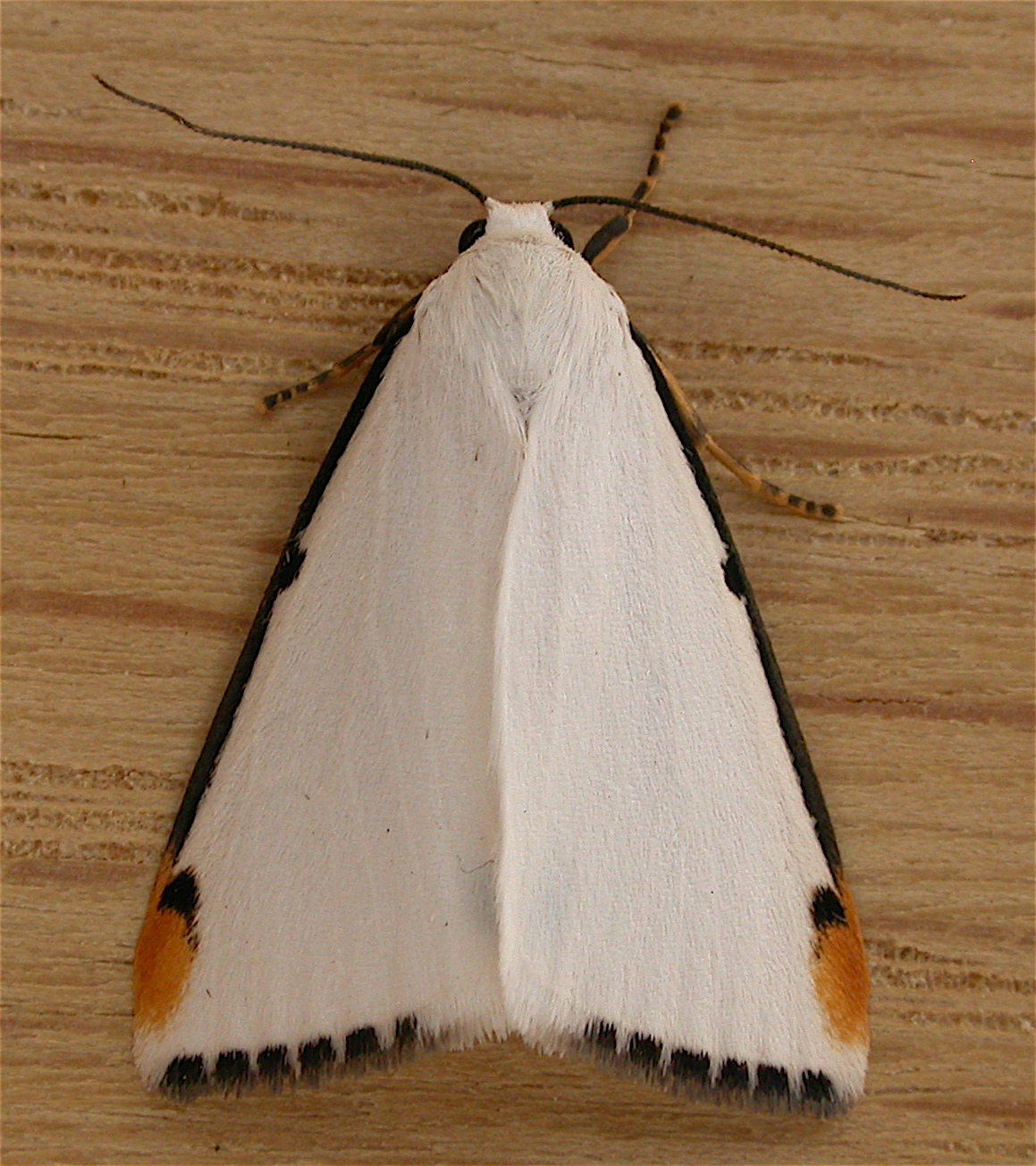
- Termessa nivosa

Scientific classification
- Kingdom: Animalia
- Phylum: Arthropoda
- Clade: Pancrustacea
- Class: Insecta
- Order: Lepidoptera
- Superfamily: Noctuoidea
- Family: Erebidae
- Subfamily: Arctiinae
- Tribe: Lithosiini
- Genus: Termessa; Newman, 1856

Synonyms
- Termessa Walker, 1856; Clisobara Walker, [1865]; Lerna Walker, 1865

= Termessa =

Genus of moths

Termessa is a genus of moths in the subfamily Arctiinae The genus was described by Newman in 1856.

== Species ==
- Termessa catocalina (Walker, [1865])
- Termessa congrua Walker, [1865]
- Termessa conographa Meyrick, 1886
- Termessa diplographa Turner, 1899
- Termessa discrepans Walker, [1865]
- Termessa gratiosa (Walker, [1865])
- Termessa laeta Walker, 1856
- Termessa nivosa Walker, 1865
- Termessa orthocrossa Turner, 1922
- Termessa shepherdi Newman, 1856
- Termessa xanthomelas Lower, 1892
- Termessa zonophanes Meyrick, 1888
