= Acinia macroducta =

Scientific classification
- Kingdom: Animalia
- Phylum: Arthropoda
- Class: Insecta
- Order: Diptera
- Family: Tephritidae
- Subfamily: Tephritinae
- Genus: Acinia
- Species: A. macroducta

Binomial name
- Acinia macroducta Dirlbek & Dirlbekova, 1972

Species of fly

Acinia macroducta is a species of tephritid or fruit flies in the genus Acinia of the family Tephritidae.

== Distribution ==
Mongolia, China.
