= Neotephritis cinerea =

Scientific classification
- Kingdom: Animalia
- Phylum: Arthropoda
- Class: Insecta
- Order: Diptera
- Family: Tephritidae
- Subfamily: Tephritinae
- Tribe: Tephritini
- Genus: Neotephritis
- Species: N. cinerea

Binomial name
- Neotephritis cinerea (Blanchard, 1852)

Synonyms
- Acinia cinerea Blanchard, 1852

Species of fly

Neotephritis cinerea is a species of tephritid or fruit flies in the genus Neotephritis of the family Tephritidae.

== Distribution ==
Chile, Brazil, Argentina.
