= Euarestoides dreisbachi =

Scientific classification
- Kingdom: Animalia
- Phylum: Arthropoda
- Class: Insecta
- Order: Diptera
- Family: Tephritidae
- Subfamily: Tephritinae
- Tribe: Tephritini
- Genus: Euarestoides
- Species: E. dreisbachi

Binomial name
- Euarestoides dreisbachi Foote, 1958 -

Species of fly

Euarestoides dreisbachi is a species of fruit fly in the family Tephritidae.

== Distribution ==
Guatemala, Mexico, Peru.
