= Acinia tessariae =

Scientific classification
- Kingdom: Animalia
- Phylum: Arthropoda
- Class: Insecta
- Order: Diptera
- Family: Tephritidae
- Subfamily: Tephritinae
- Genus: Acinia
- Species: A. tessariae

Binomial name
- Acinia tessariae (Kieffer & Jörgensen, 1910)

Synonyms
- Urophora tessariae Kieffer & Jörgensen, 1910

Species of fly

Acinia tessariae is a species of tephritid or fruit flies in the genus Acinia of the family Tephritidae.

== Distribution ==
Chile, Argentina.
