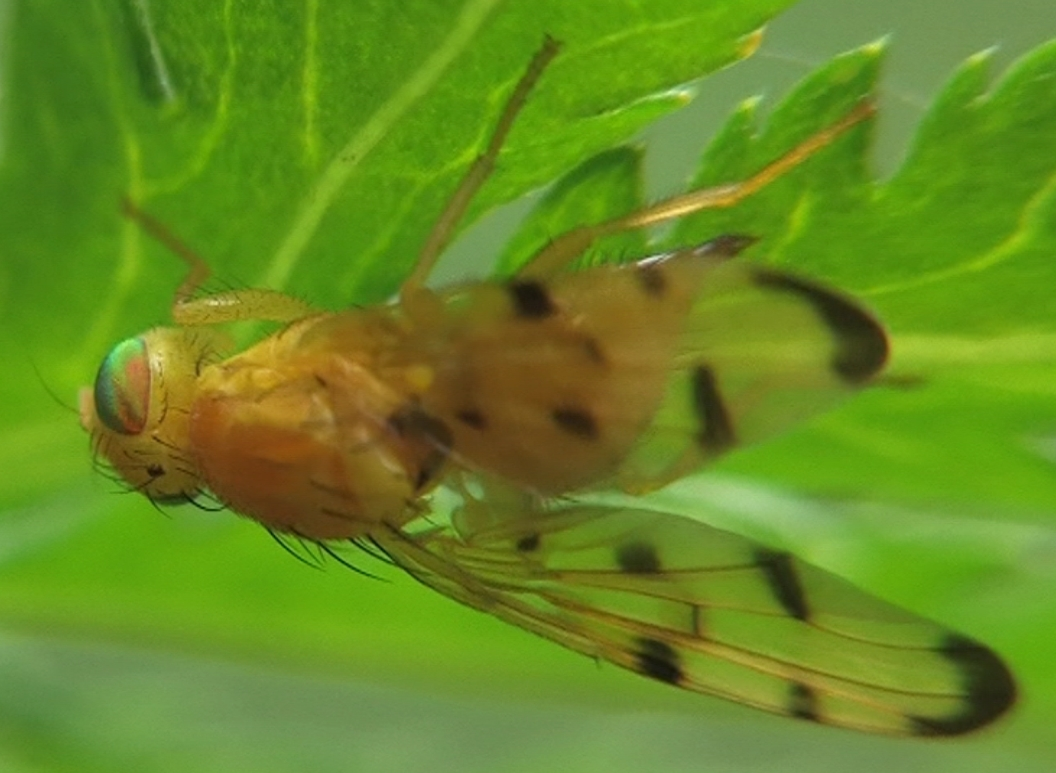
- Female Trypeta artemisiae

Scientific classification
- Kingdom: Animalia
- Phylum: Arthropoda
- Class: Insecta
- Order: Diptera
- Family: Tephritidae
- Genus: Trypeta
- Species: T. artemisiae

Binomial name
- Trypeta artemisiae (Fabricius, 1794)

Synonyms
- Musca artemisiae Fabricius, 1794

= Trypeta artemisiae =

Species of fly

Trypeta artemisiae is a species of tephritid or fruit flies in the genus Trypeta of the family Tephritidae.

Video of Trypeta artemisiae ovipositing
