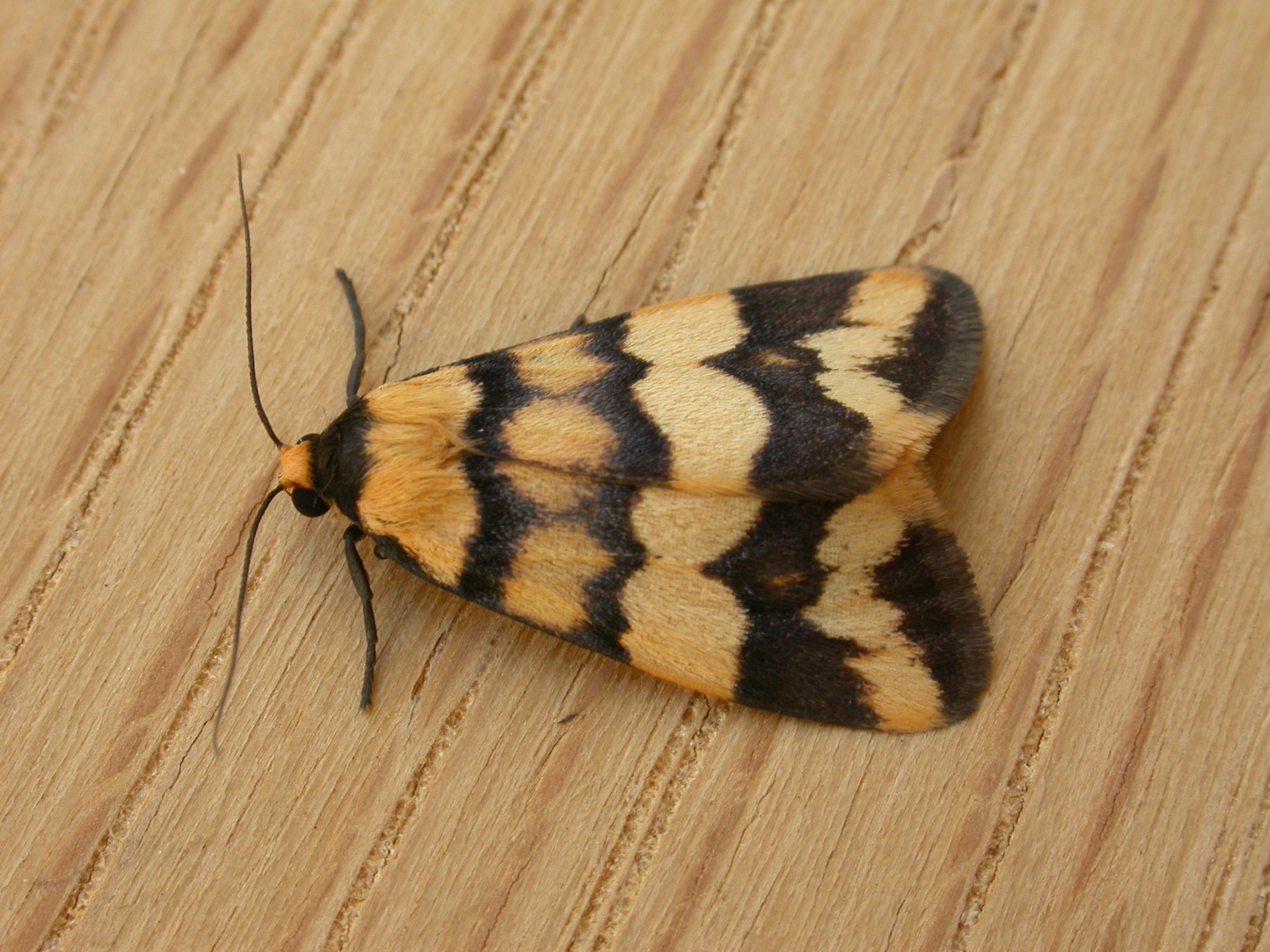

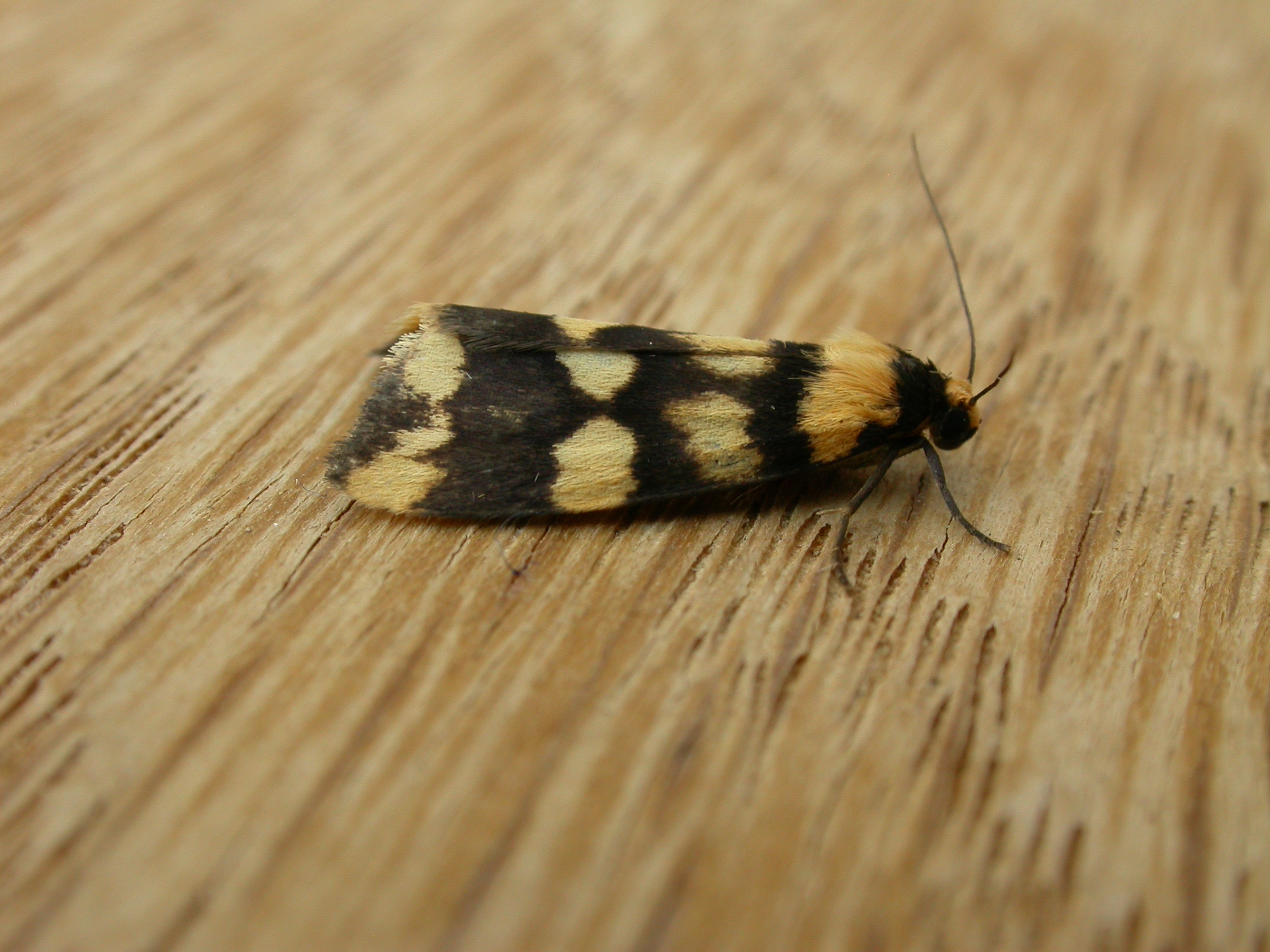

Scientific classification
- Kingdom: Animalia
- Phylum: Arthropoda
- Class: Insecta
- Order: Lepidoptera
- Superfamily: Noctuoidea
- Family: Erebidae
- Subfamily: Arctiinae
- Genus: Termessa
- Species: T. zonophanes

Binomial name
- Termessa zonophanes Meyrick, 1888

Synonyms
- Castulo zonophanes

= Termessa zonophanes =

Species of moth

Termessa zonophanes, the double yellow-patched footman, is a moth of the subfamily Arctiinae. The species was first described by Edward Meyrick in 1888. It is known from the Australian Capital Territory, New South Wales, Queensland and Victoria.

The larvae probably feed on lichens.
