= Euarestoides abstersus =

Scientific classification
- Kingdom: Animalia
- Phylum: Arthropoda
- Class: Insecta
- Order: Diptera
- Family: Tephritidae
- Subfamily: Tephritinae
- Tribe: Tephritini
- Genus: Euarestoides
- Species: E. abstersus

Binomial name
- Euarestoides abstersus Loew, 1862

Synonyms
- Trypeta abstersa Loew, 1862

Species of fly

Euarestoides abstersus is a species of fruit fly in the family Tephritidae.

== Distribution ==
Bahamas, eastern Canada and USA.
