= Trypeta cyanogaster =

Scientific classification
- Kingdom: Animalia
- Phylum: Arthropoda
- Class: Insecta
- Order: Diptera
- Family: Tephritidae
- Genus: Trypeta
- Species: T. cyanogaster

Binomial name
- Trypeta cyanogaster Wiedemann, 1830

Species of fly

Trypeta cyanogaster is a species of tephritid or fruit flies in the genus Trypeta of the family Tephritidae.
