= Trypeta lineata =

Scientific classification
- Kingdom: Animalia
- Phylum: Arthropoda
- Clade: Pancrustacea
- Class: Insecta
- Order: Diptera
- Family: Tephritidae
- Genus: Trypeta
- Species: T. lineata

Binomial name
- Trypeta lineata Bezzi, 1913

Species of fly

Trypeta lineata is a species of tephritid or fruit flies in the genus Trypeta of the family Tephritidae.
