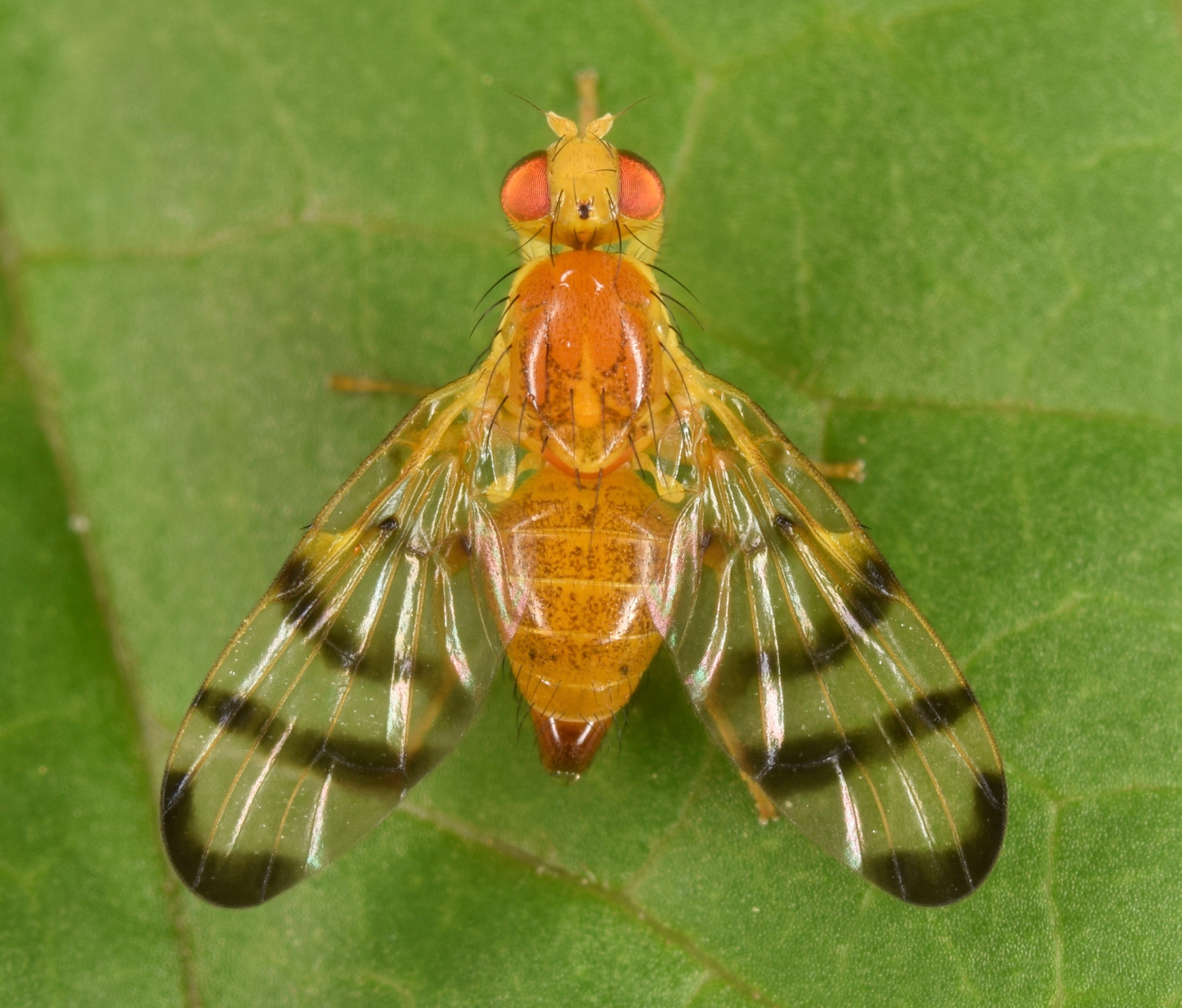
- Adult fly

Scientific classification
- Kingdom: Animalia
- Phylum: Arthropoda
- Class: Insecta
- Order: Diptera
- Family: Tephritidae
- Genus: Trypeta
- Species: T. flaveola

Binomial name
- Trypeta flaveola Coquillett, 1899

= Trypeta flaveola =

Species of fly

Trypeta flaveola is a species of tephritid or fruit flies in the genus Trypeta of the family Tephritidae.

It is widely distributed in North America. The larvae are leaf miners on several genera of Asteraceae.
