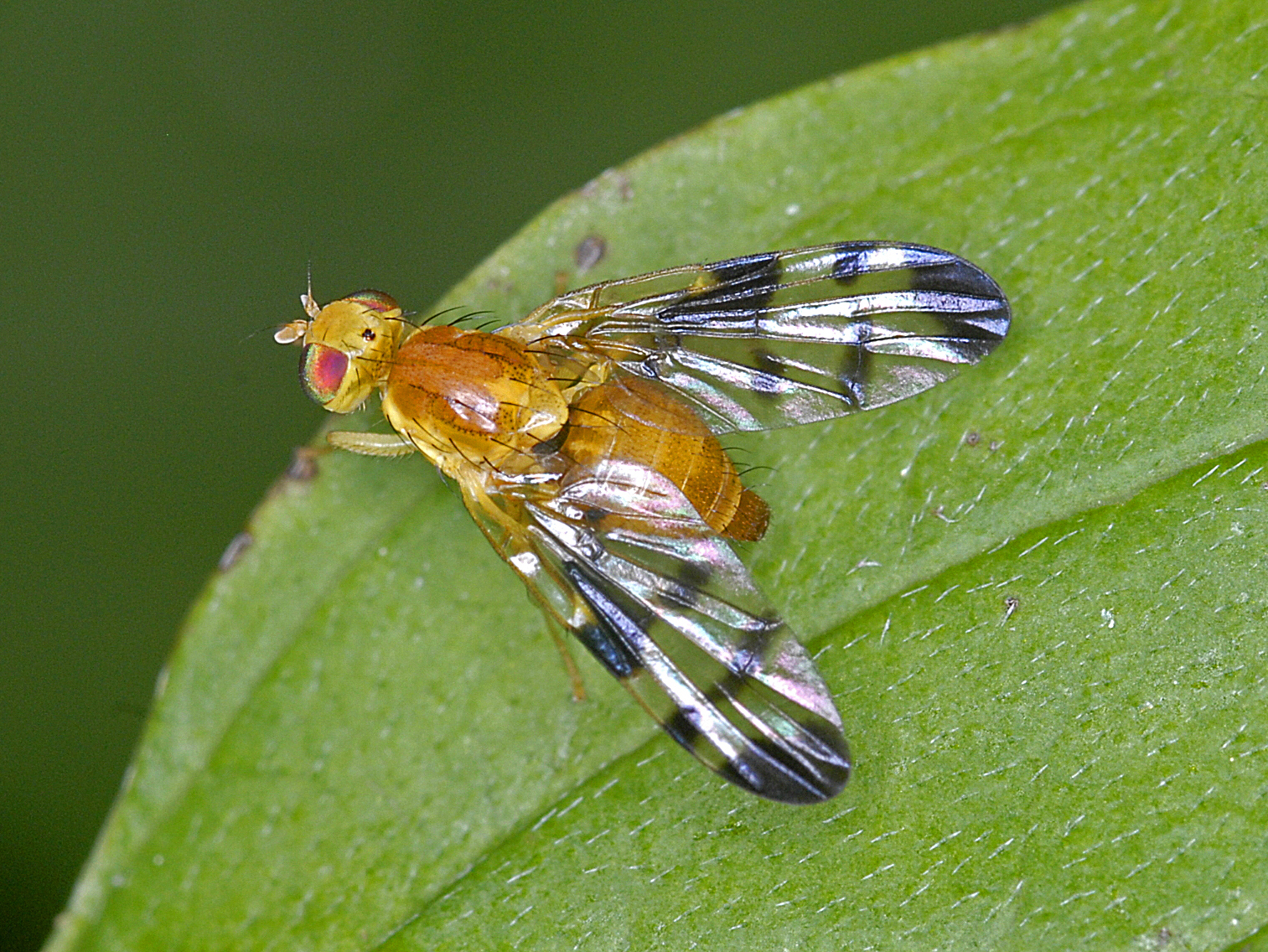
- Female of Trypeta zoe

Scientific classification
- Kingdom: Animalia
- Phylum: Arthropoda
- Class: Insecta
- Order: Diptera
- Family: Tephritidae
- Genus: Trypeta
- Species: T. zoe

Binomial name
- Trypeta zoe Meigen, 1826

= Trypeta zoe =

Species of fly

Trypeta zoe, the daisy leafminer, is a species of tephritid or fruit flies in the genus Trypeta of the family Tephritidae.

Foodplants include Achillea species, Artemisia vulgaris, Artemisia absinthium and Leucanthemum vulgare, where larvae form leaf mines.

This species is present in Austria, Belgium, Bulgaria, Croatia, Czech Republic, Denmark, Finland, France, Germany, Great Britain, Hungary, Ireland, Italy, Norway, Poland, Romania, Slovakia, Spain, Sweden, Switzerland and Netherlands.
