= Termessa conographa =

Scientific classification
- Kingdom: Animalia
- Phylum: Arthropoda
- Class: Insecta
- Order: Lepidoptera
- Superfamily: Noctuoidea
- Family: Erebidae
- Subfamily: Arctiinae
- Genus: Termessa
- Species: T. conographa

Binomial name
- Termessa conographa Meyrick, 1886

Synonyms
- Castulo conographa

Species of moth

Termessa conographa is a moth in the subfamily Arctiinae. It was described by Edward Meyrick in 1886. It is found in Australia, where it has been recorded from New South Wales and Queensland.
