= Termessa catocalina =

Scientific classification
- Kingdom: Animalia
- Phylum: Arthropoda
- Class: Insecta
- Order: Lepidoptera
- Superfamily: Noctuoidea
- Family: Erebidae
- Subfamily: Arctiinae
- Genus: Termessa
- Species: T. catocalina

Binomial name
- Termessa catocalina (Walker, [1865])

Synonyms
- Clisobara catocalina Walker, [1865]; Castulo catocalina

Species of moth

Termessa catocalina is a moth in the subfamily Arctiinae. It was described by Francis Walker in 1865. It is found in Australia, where it has been recorded from New South Wales and Victoria.

The wingspan is about 15 mm.
