= Acinia picturata =

Scientific classification
- Kingdom: Animalia
- Phylum: Arthropoda
- Class: Insecta
- Order: Diptera
- Family: Tephritidae
- Subfamily: Tephritinae
- Genus: Acinia
- Species: A. picturata

Binomial name
- Acinia picturata (Snow, 1894)

Synonyms
- Baryplegma maculipennis Snow, 1894; Tephritis picturata Cole, 1923; Acinia germanna Foote, Blanc & Norrbom, 1993; Musca fucata Fabricius, 1794; Musca furcata Turton, 1801

Species of fly

Acinia picturata, the sourbush seed fly, is a species of fruit fly in the family Tephritidae.

== Description ==
United States, Guatemala, West Indies. Introduced Hawaii, Johnston Atoll, Wake Island.
