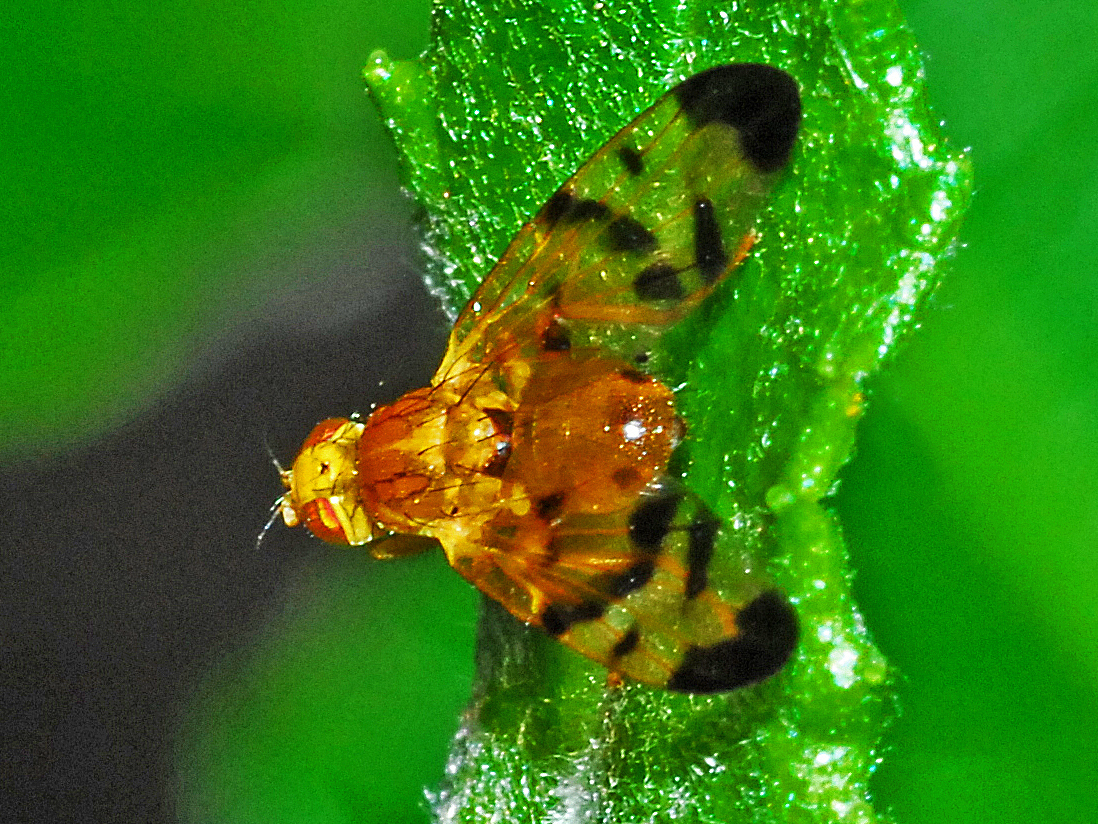
- Trypeta immaculata. Male

Scientific classification
- Kingdom: Animalia
- Phylum: Arthropoda
- Class: Insecta
- Order: Diptera
- Family: Tephritidae
- Genus: Trypeta
- Species: T. immaculata

Binomial name
- Trypeta immaculata (Macquart, 1835)

Synonyms
- Terellia immaculata (Macquart, 1855); Trypeta hamifera Loew, 1846.

= Trypeta immaculata =

Species of fly

Trypeta immaculata is a species of tephritid or fruit flies in the genus Trypeta of the family Tephritidae.

Video clip

== Distribution ==
This species is widespread in most of Europe (Austria, Belgium, Czech Republic, Denmark, Finland, France, Germany, Ireland, Italy, Norway, Poland, Romania, Slovakia, Sweden, Switzerland and The Netherlands).

== Description ==
Trypeta immaculata have wings of about 4.6–5.5 mm (0.18–0.22 in). These fruit flies have the hind femurs without any strong anteroventral subapical setae. The first flagellomere is apically rounded. Head shows two pairs of orbital setae.

Male without greatly enlarged frontal setae, and frons never extended forwards.

== Biology ==
Adults can be found from mid. June to mid. August. Larvae are present in July and September–October.

These fruit flies are almost oligophagous of Asteraceae plants. Main host plants are Aposeris foetida, Crepis paludosa, Hieracium species, Hypochaeris species, Lactuca muralis, Lapsana communis, Leontodon hispidus, Picris hieracioides, Pilosella officinarum, Prenanthes species, Scorzoneroides autumnalis, Senecio vulgaris, Sonchus arvensis, Taraxacum officinale. In the host plants larvae form leaf mines,
