= Euarestoides rionegrensis =

Scientific classification
- Kingdom: Animalia
- Phylum: Arthropoda
- Clade: Pancrustacea
- Class: Insecta
- Order: Diptera
- Family: Tephritidae
- Subfamily: Tephritinae
- Tribe: Tephritini
- Genus: Euarestoides
- Species: E. rionegrensis

Binomial name
- Euarestoides rionegrensis Savaris & Norrbom, 2019

Species of fly

Euarestoides rionegrensis is a Colombian species of fruit fly in the family Tephritidae.
