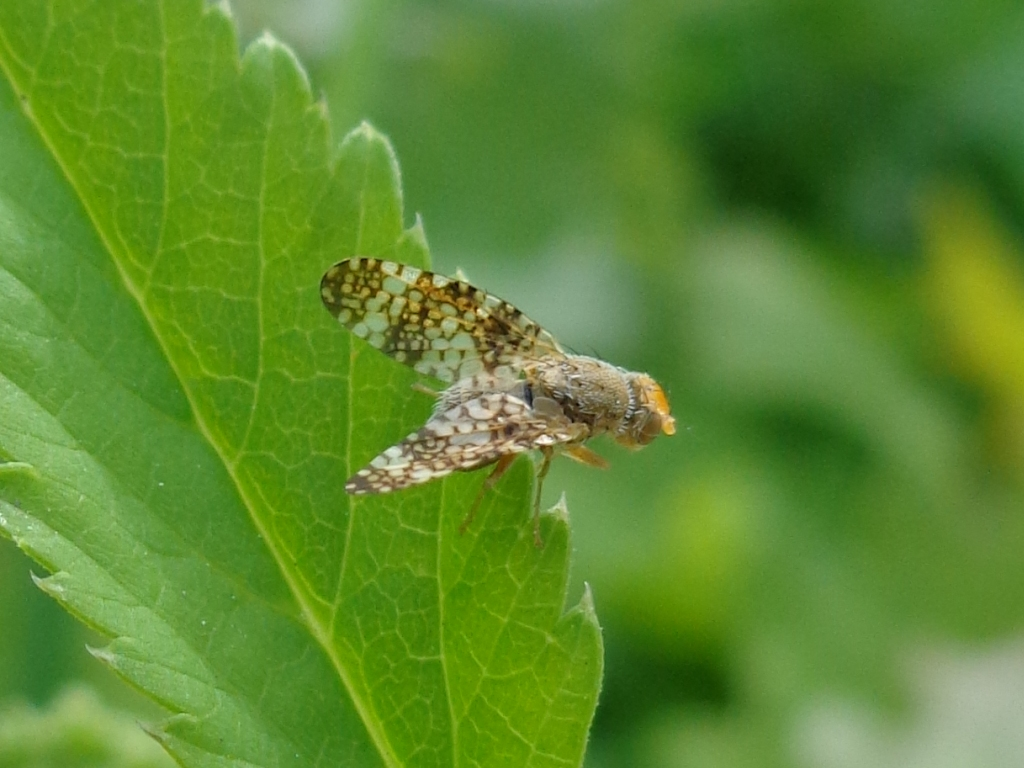

Scientific classification
- Kingdom: Animalia
- Phylum: Arthropoda
- Class: Insecta
- Order: Diptera
- Family: Tephritidae
- Subfamily: Tephritinae
- Genus: Acinia
- Species: A. corniculata

Binomial name
- Acinia corniculata (Zetterstedt, 1819)

Synonyms
- Acinia jaceae Robineau-Desvoidy, 1830; Acinia javeae Duponchel, 1841; Tephritis corniculata Zetterstedt, 1819

= Acinia corniculata =

Species of fly

Acinia corniculata, is a species of fruit fly in the family Tephritidae.

== Description ==
Britain Scandinavia, France, Italy, Balkans, Ukraine, United States.
