= Clinotaenia =

Scientific classification
- Kingdom: Animalia
- Phylum: Arthropoda
- Clade: Pancrustacea
- Class: Insecta
- Order: Diptera
- Family: Tephritidae
- Subfamily: Dacinae
- Tribe: Gastrozonini
- Genus: Clinotaenia; Bezzi, 1920

Genus of flies

Clinotaenia is a genus of tephritid or fruit flies in the family Tephritidae.

== Species ==
- Clinotaenia anastrephina Bezzi, 1920
- Clinotaenia atlas Munro, 1957
- Clinotaenia cedarensis Munro, 1933
- Clinotaenia grata (Wiedemann, 1830)
- Clinotaenia inyanga Hancock, 1985
- Clinotaenia angusticeps Bezzi, 1923
- Clinotaenia camerunica Hancock, 1999
- Clinotaenia superba Bezzi, 1918
