= Euarestoides =

Scientific classification
- Kingdom: Animalia
- Phylum: Arthropoda
- Class: Insecta
- Order: Diptera
- Family: Tephritidae
- Subfamily: Tephritinae
- Tribe: Tephritini
- Genus: Euarestoides; Benjamin, 1934

Type species
- Trypeta abstersa Loew, 1862

Genus of flies

Euarestoides is a genus of the family Tephritidae. The genus contains six species.

== Species ==
- Euarestoides abstersus (Loew, 1862) - Bahamas, eastern Canada and USA
- Euarestoides acutangulus (Thomson, 1869) - Canada, Chile, Colombia, Cuba, Dominican Republic, Ecuador, Mexico, Peru, Puerto Rico, Trinidad & Tobago, USA, and Venezuela
- Euarestoides bimaculatus Savaris & Norrbom, 2019 - Peru
- Euarestoides dreisbachi Foote, 1958 - Guatemala, Mexico, Peru
- Euarestoides pereirai Savaris & Norrbom, 2019 - Brazil
- Euarestoides rionegrensis Savaris & Norrbom, 2019 - Colombia
