= Platomma luniferum =

Scientific classification
- Kingdom: Animalia
- Phylum: Arthropoda
- Class: Insecta
- Order: Diptera
- Family: Tephritidae
- Subfamily: Tephritinae
- Tribe: Tephrellini
- Genus: Platomma
- Species: P. luniferum

Binomial name
- Platomma luniferum (Loew, 1861)

Synonyms
- Trypeta lunifera Loew, 1861; Trypeta lunifera Loew, 1862

Species of fly

Platomma luniferum is a species of tephritid or fruit flies in the genus Platomma of the family Tephritidae.

== Distribution ==
Namibia, South Africa.
