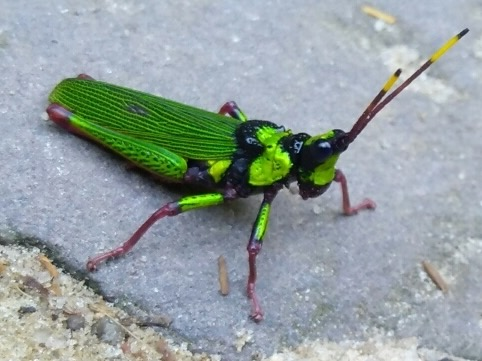

Scientific classification
- Kingdom: Animalia
- Phylum: Arthropoda
- Class: Insecta
- Order: Orthoptera
- Suborder: Caelifera
- Family: Pyrgomorphidae
- Genus: Taphronota
- Species: T. ferruginea

Binomial name
- Taphronota ferruginea (Fabricius, 1781)

Synonyms
- Acridium apicicornis Fairmaire, 1858; Acridium thaelephorum Haan, 1842; Gryllus thaelephorus Schaum, 1862; Gryllus thaelephorus Houttuyn, 1813; Phymateus pulchripes Walker, F., 1870; Poecilocera ornata Burmeister, H., 1838; Poecilocerus ornatus Kirby, 1914; Taphronota calliparea Johnsen, 1975; Taphronota gabonica Karsch, F., 1888; Taphronota subverrucosa Saussure, 1899

= Taphronota ferruginea =

Species of grasshopper

Taphronota ferruginea is a west and central African species of grasshopper from the genus Taphronota. The species was first described in 1781.
