= Euarestoides acutangulus =

Scientific classification
- Kingdom: Animalia
- Phylum: Arthropoda
- Class: Insecta
- Order: Diptera
- Family: Tephritidae
- Subfamily: Tephritinae
- Tribe: Tephritini
- Genus: Euarestoides
- Species: E. acutangulus

Binomial name
- Euarestoides acutangulus (Thomson, 1869)

Synonyms
- Trypeta acutangula Thomson, 1869

Species of fly

Euarestoides acutangulus is a species of fruit fly in the family Tephritidae.

== Distribution ==
United States and Mexico.
