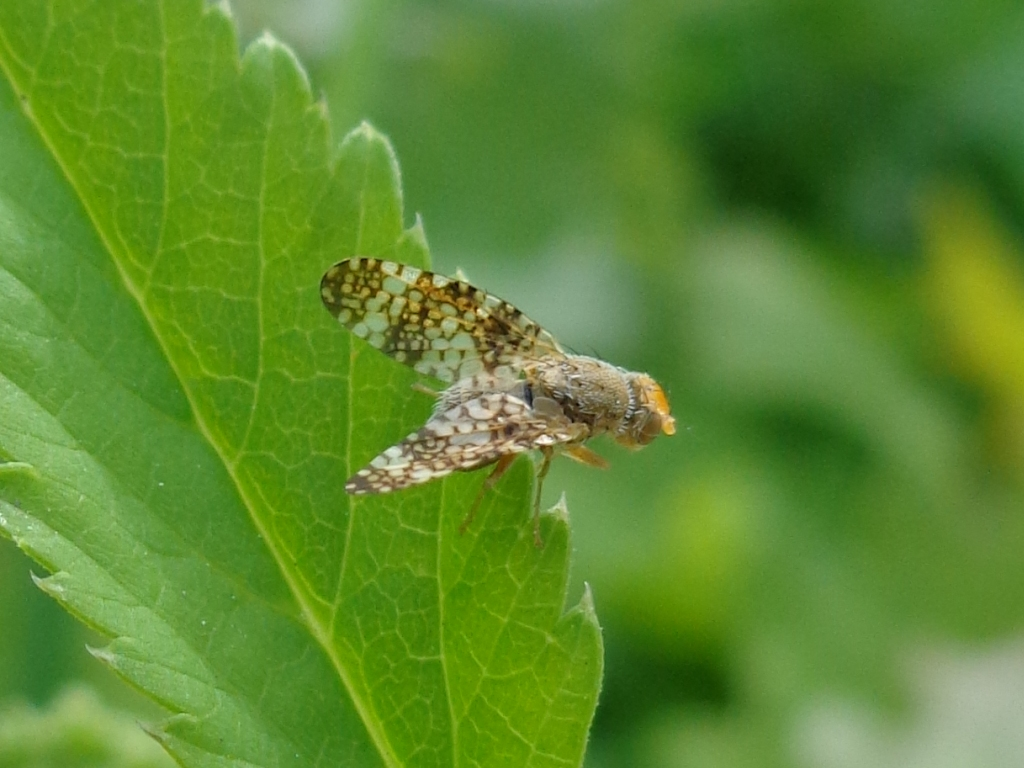
- Acinia corniculata

Scientific classification
- Domain: Eukaryota
- Kingdom: Animalia
- Phylum: Arthropoda
- Class: Insecta
- Order: Diptera
- Family: Tephritidae
- Subfamily: Tephritinae
- Genus: Acinia; Robineau-Desvoidy, 1830

Type species
- Acinia jaceae Robineau-Desvoidy, 1830

= Acinia =

Genus of flies

Acinia is a genus of tephritid or fruit flies in the family Tephritidae.

== Species ==
- A. aurata Aczel, 1958
- A. biflexa (Loew, 1844)
- A. corniculata (Zetterstedt, 1819)
- A. hendeli Aczel, 1958
- A. ica Hering, 1941
- A. jungsukae Kwon, 1985
- A. macroducta Dirlbek & Dirlbekova, 1972
- A. mallochi Aczel, 1958
- A. obscura Aczel, 1958
- A. peruana Aczel, 1958
- A. picturata (Snow, 1894)
- A. reticulata Aczel, 1958
- A. tessariae (Kieffer & Jörgensen, 1910)
