= Tephritis mixta =

Scientific classification
- Kingdom: Animalia
- Phylum: Arthropoda
- Class: Insecta
- Order: Diptera
- Family: Tephritidae
- Genus: Tephritis
- Species: T. mixta

Binomial name
- Tephritis mixta (Walker, 1853)

Synonyms
- Trypeta mixta Walker, 1853

Species of fly

Tephritis mixta is a species of fruit fly in the family Tephritidae. It is one of more than 200 species in the genus Tephritis.
