= Termessa laeta =

Scientific classification
- Kingdom: Animalia
- Phylum: Arthropoda
- Clade: Pancrustacea
- Class: Insecta
- Order: Lepidoptera
- Superfamily: Noctuoidea
- Family: Erebidae
- Subfamily: Arctiinae
- Genus: Termessa
- Species: T. laeta

Binomial name
- Termessa laeta Walker, 1856

Synonyms
- Castulo laeta

Species of moth

Termessa laeta is a moth in the subfamily Arctiinae. It was described by Francis Walker in 1856. It is found in Australia, where it has been recorded from the Australian Capital Territory, New South Wales, Queensland, South Australia, Victoria and Western Australia.
