= Tillandsia albida =

Scientific classification
- Kingdom: Plantae
- Clade: Embryophytes
- Clade: Tracheophytes
- Clade: Spermatophytes
- Clade: Angiosperms
- Clade: Monocots
- Clade: Commelinids
- Order: Poales
- Family: Bromeliaceae
- Genus: Tillandsia
- Subgenus: Tillandsia subg. Tillandsia
- Species: T. albida

Binomial name
- Tillandsia albida Mez & Purpus

Species of plant

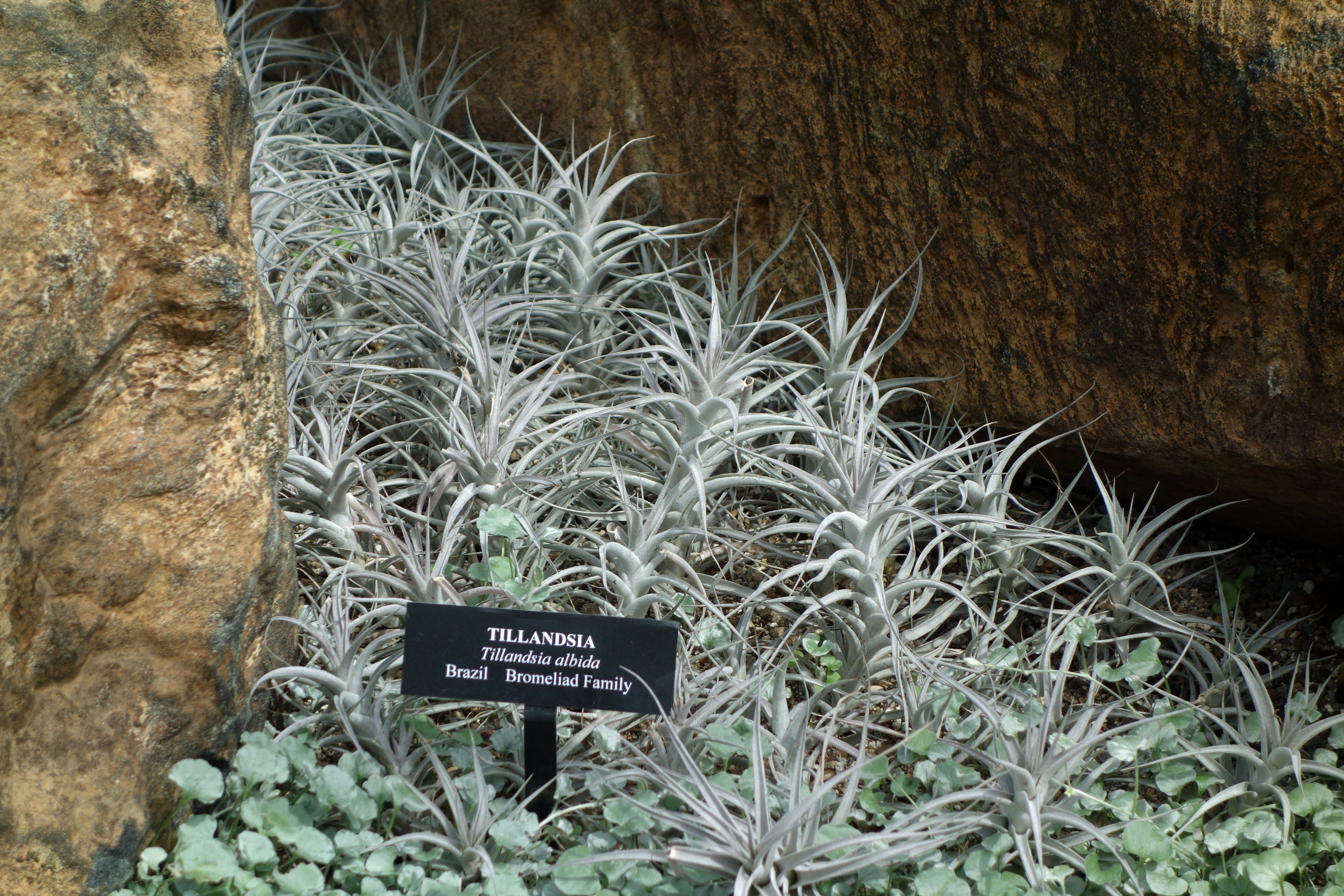
Tillandsia albida

Tillandsia albida is a species of flowering plant in the family Bromeliaceae. This species is endemic to Mexico.

== Description ==
The Tillandsia albida is a light green/white air plant which tolerates dry conditions. Its flowers are a light cream color. It enjoys bright light and warm weather. It is endemic to Mexico.

== Cultivars ==
Recognized cultivars include:

- Tillandsia 'Impression Perfection'
- Tillandsia 'Tall Stranger'
