= Clinotaenia grata =

Scientific classification
- Kingdom: Animalia
- Phylum: Arthropoda
- Class: Insecta
- Order: Diptera
- Family: Tephritidae
- Genus: Clinotaenia
- Species: C. grata

Binomial name
- Clinotaenia grata (Wiedemann, 1830)

Species of fly

Clinotaenia grata is a species of tephritid or fruit flies in the genus Clinotaenia of the family Tephritidae.
