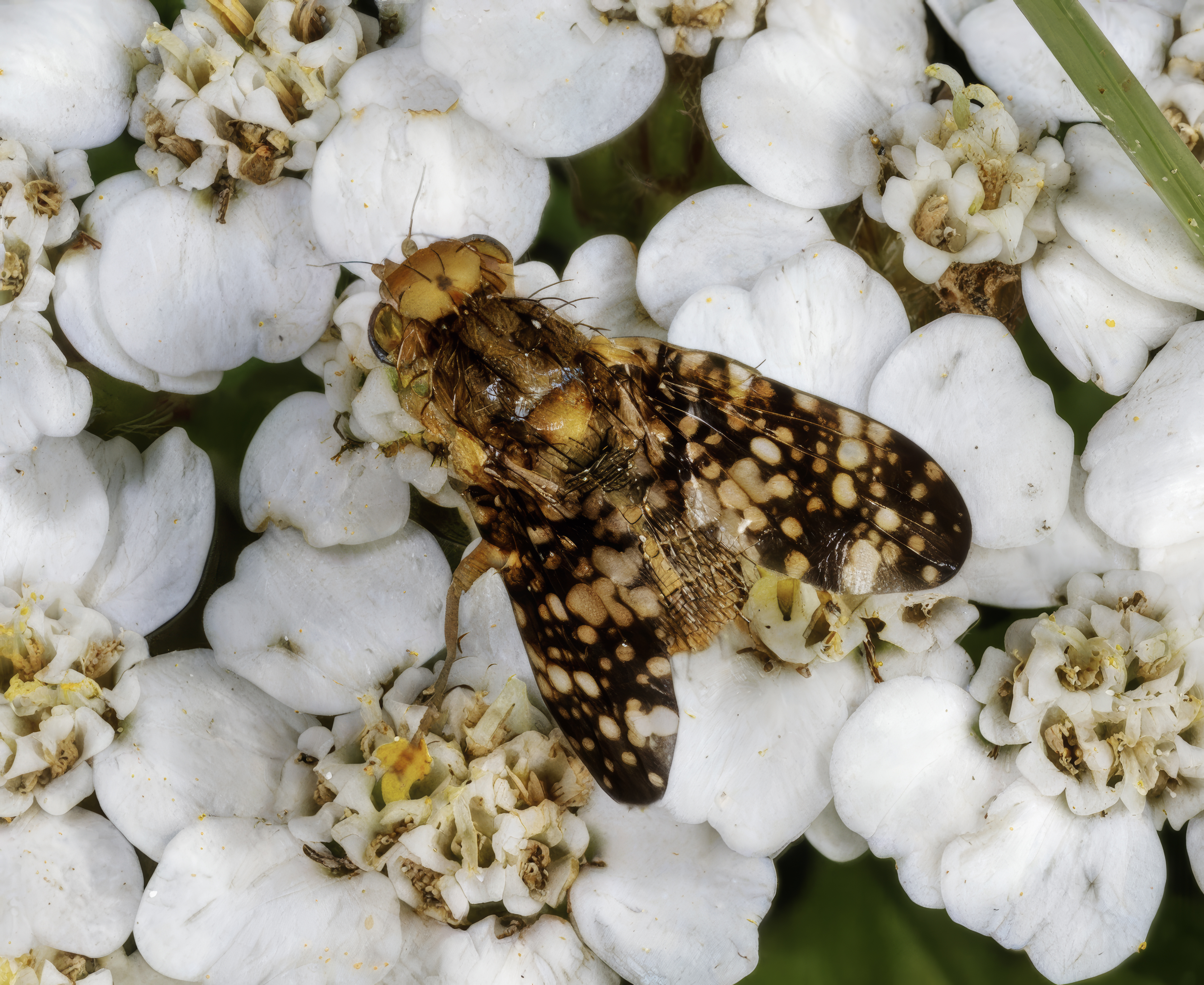
- Neotephritis finalis

Scientific classification
- Kingdom: Animalia
- Phylum: Arthropoda
- Class: Insecta
- Order: Diptera
- Family: Tephritidae
- Subfamily: Tephritinae
- Tribe: Tephritini
- Genus: Neotephritis; Hendel, 1935

Type species
- Trypeta finalis Loew, 1862

= Neotephritis =

Genus of flies

Neotephritis is a genus of tephritid or fruit flies in the family Tephritidae.

== Species ==
- Neotephritis bruesi (Bates, 1933)
- Neotephritis cancellata (Wulp, 1900)
- Neotephritis cinerea (Blanchard, 1852)
- Neotephritis finalis (Loew, 1862)
- Neotephritis mundelli (Lima, 1936)
- Neotephritis nigripilosa Hardy, 1980
- Neotephritis paludosae Hardy, 1980
- Neotephritis quadrata (Malloch, 1933)
- Neotephritis rava Foote, 1960
- Neotephritis semifusca (Wulp, 1900)
- Neotephritis staminea (Wulp, 1900)
- Neotephritis thaumasta (Hering, 1942)
