= Euarestella =

Scientific classification
- Kingdom: Animalia
- Phylum: Arthropoda
- Class: Insecta
- Order: Diptera
- Family: Tephritidae
- Subfamily: Tephritinae
- Tribe: Tephritini
- Genus: Euarestella; Hendel, 1927

Type species
- Trypeta megacephala Loew, 1846

Genus of flies

Euarestella is a genus of tephritid or fruit flies in the family Tephritidae.

== Species ==
- Euarestella abyssinica Hering, 1937
- Euarestella iphionae (Efflatoun, 1924)
- Euarestella korneyevi Merz, 2011
- Euarestella kugleri Freidberg, 1974
- Euarestella megacephala (Loew, 1846)
- Euarestella nigra Merz, 2008
- Euarestella pninae Freidberg, 1981
