= Asimoneura =

Scientific classification
- Kingdom: Animalia
- Phylum: Arthropoda
- Clade: Pancrustacea
- Class: Insecta
- Order: Diptera
- Family: Tephritidae
- Subfamily: Tephritinae
- Tribe: Myopitini
- Genus: Asimoneura; Czerny, 1909

Type species
- Asimoneura stroblii Czerny, 1909

Genus of flies

Asimoneura is a genus of tephritid or fruit flies in the family Tephritidae.

== Species ==
- Asimoneura indecora (Loew, 1861)
- Asimoneura pantomelas (Bezzi, 1926)
- Asimoneura petiolata (Munro, 1931)
- Asimoneura shirakii (Munro, 1935)
- Asimoneura stroblii Czerny, 1909
