= Acinia biflexa =

Scientific classification
- Kingdom: Animalia
- Phylum: Arthropoda
- Class: Insecta
- Order: Diptera
- Family: Tephritidae
- Subfamily: Tephritinae
- Genus: Acinia
- Species: A. biflexa

Binomial name
- Acinia biflexa (Loew, 1844)

Synonyms
- Trypeta biflexa Loew, 1844

Species of fly

Acinia biflexa is a species of tephritid or fruit flies in the genus Acinia of the family Tephritidae.

== Distribution ==
Belgium & West Russia to Albania & Kazakhstan.
