= Acinia aurata =

Scientific classification
- Kingdom: Animalia
- Phylum: Arthropoda
- Class: Insecta
- Order: Diptera
- Family: Tephritidae
- Subfamily: Tephritinae
- Genus: Acinia
- Species: A. aurata

Binomial name
- Acinia aurata Aczel, 1958

Species of fly

Acinia aurata is a species of tephritid or fruit flies in the genus Acinia of the family Tephritidae.

== Distribution ==
Bolivia, Argentina.
