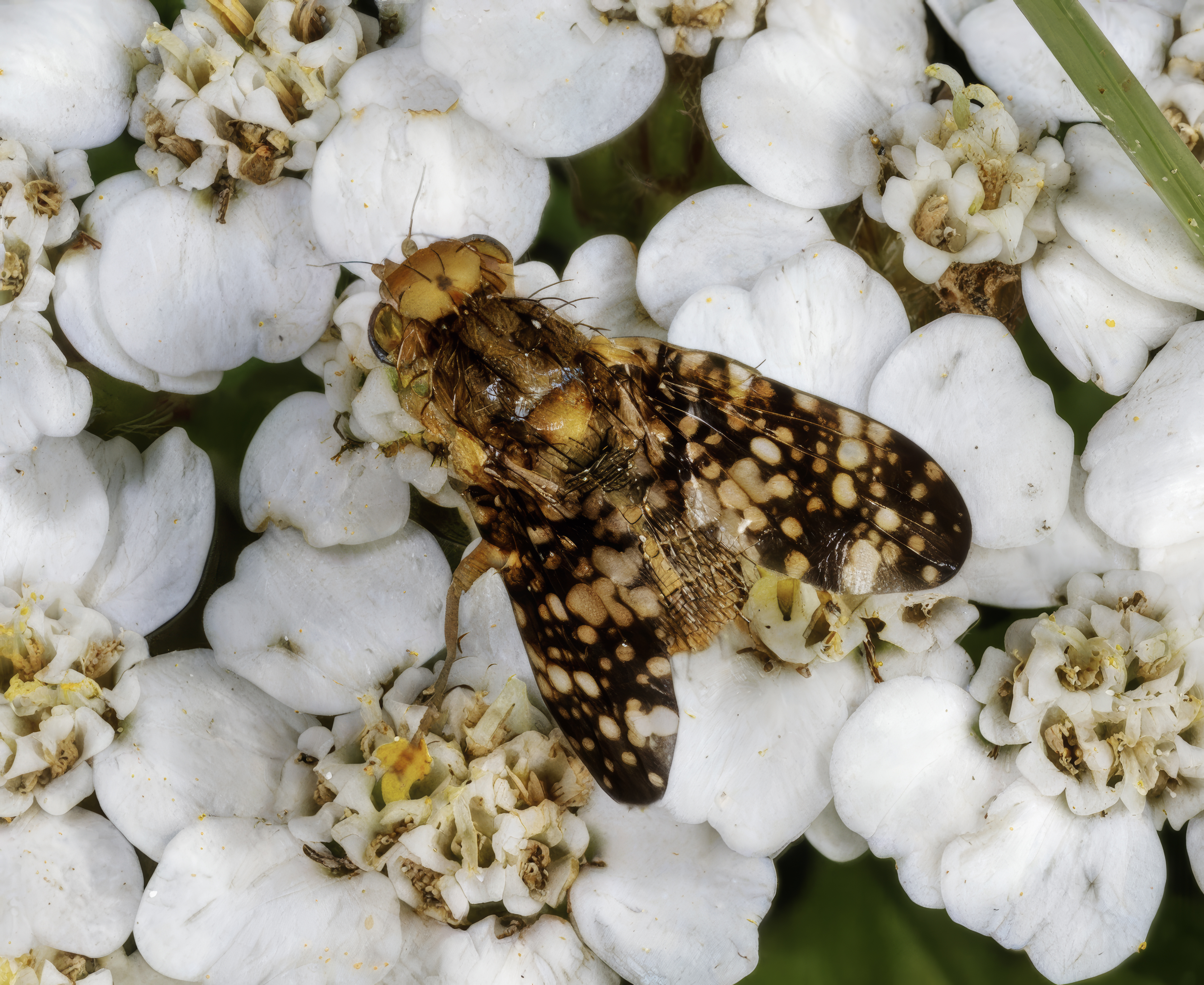

Scientific classification
- Kingdom: Animalia
- Phylum: Arthropoda
- Class: Insecta
- Order: Diptera
- Family: Tephritidae
- Subfamily: Tephritinae
- Tribe: Tephritini
- Genus: Neotephritis
- Species: N. finalis

Binomial name
- Neotephritis finalis (Loew, 1862)

Synonyms
- Neotephritis inornata Snow, 1894; Tephritis affinis Loew, 1862; Tephritis inornata (Coquillett, 1902); Trypeta finalis Coquillett, 1902

= Neotephritis finalis =

Species of fly

Neotephritis finalis, the sunflower seed maggot, is a species of fruit fly in the family Tephritidae.

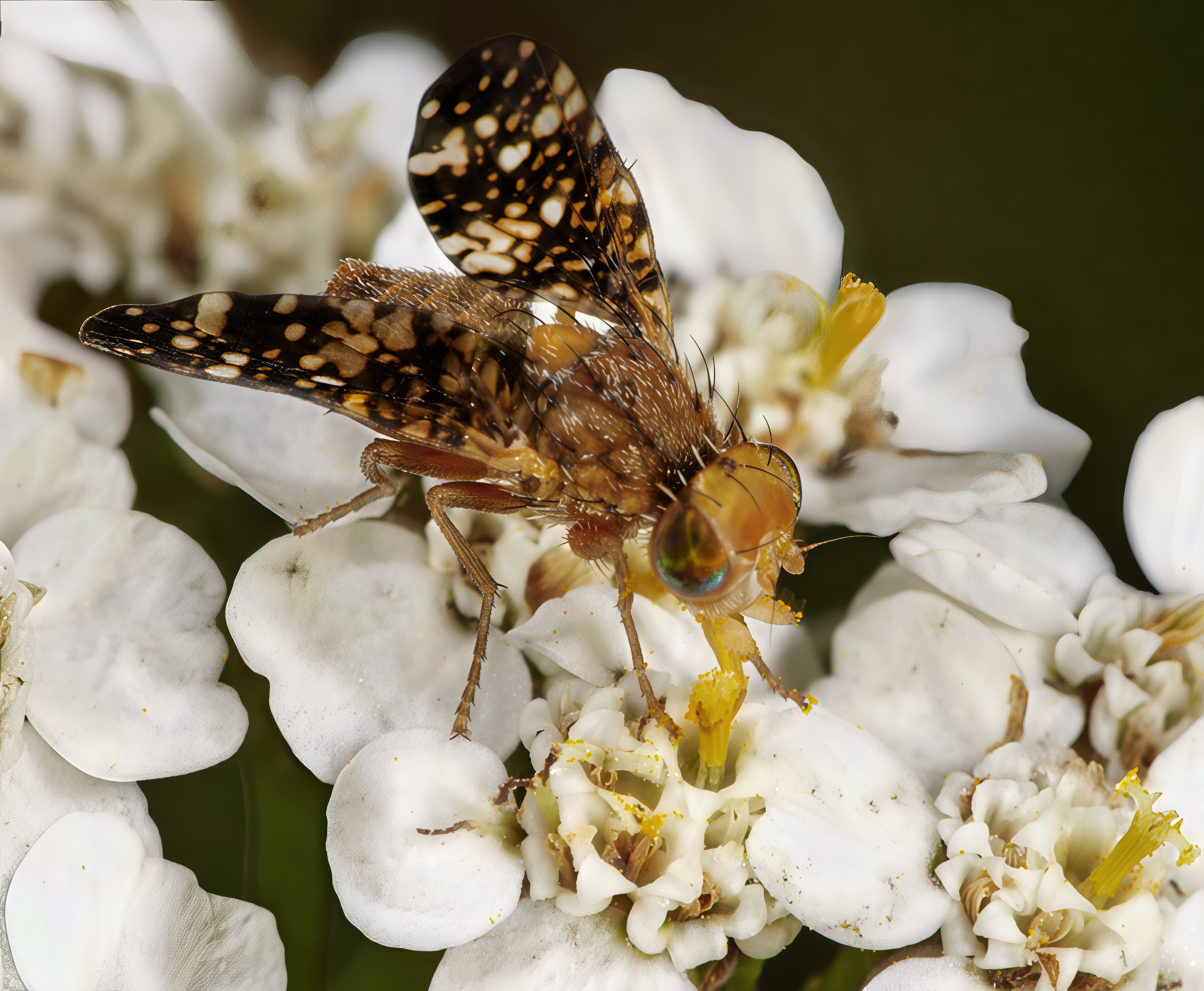
Neotephritis finalis - portrait

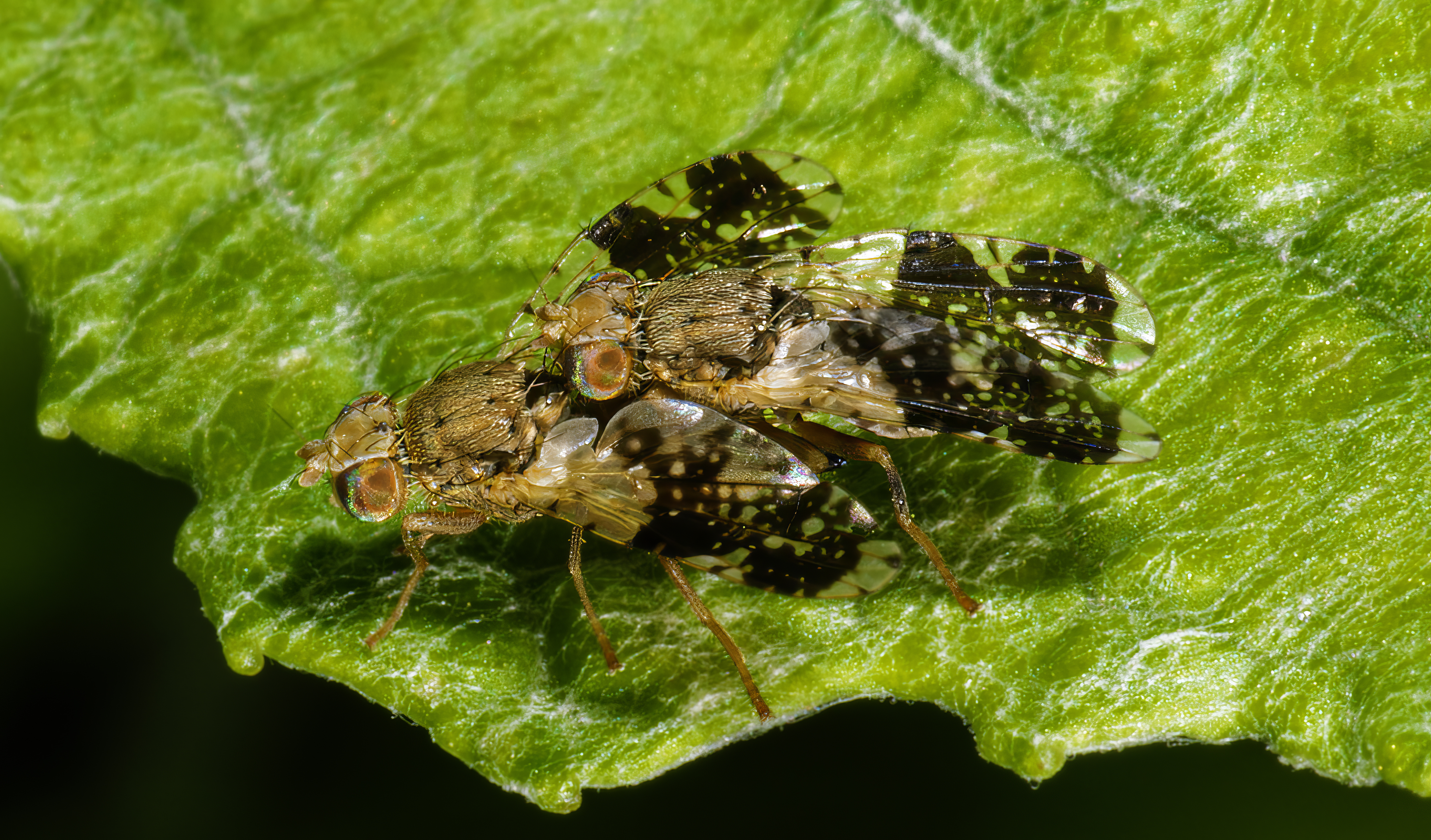
Neotephritis finalis - mating

== Distribution ==
Canada, USA and Mexico.
