= Acalolepta aurata =

Scientific classification
- Domain: Eukaryota
- Kingdom: Animalia
- Phylum: Arthropoda
- Class: Insecta
- Order: Coleoptera
- Suborder: Polyphaga
- Infraorder: Cucujiformia
- Family: Cerambycidae
- Tribe: Lamiini
- Genus: Acalolepta
- Species: A. aurata

Binomial name
- Acalolepta aurata (Gahan, 1888)

Synonyms
- Monohammus auratus Gahan, 1888

Species of beetle

Acalolepta aurata is a species of beetle in the family Cerambycidae. It was described by Charles Joseph Gahan in 1888. It is known from Bangladesh, India, and Cambodia.
