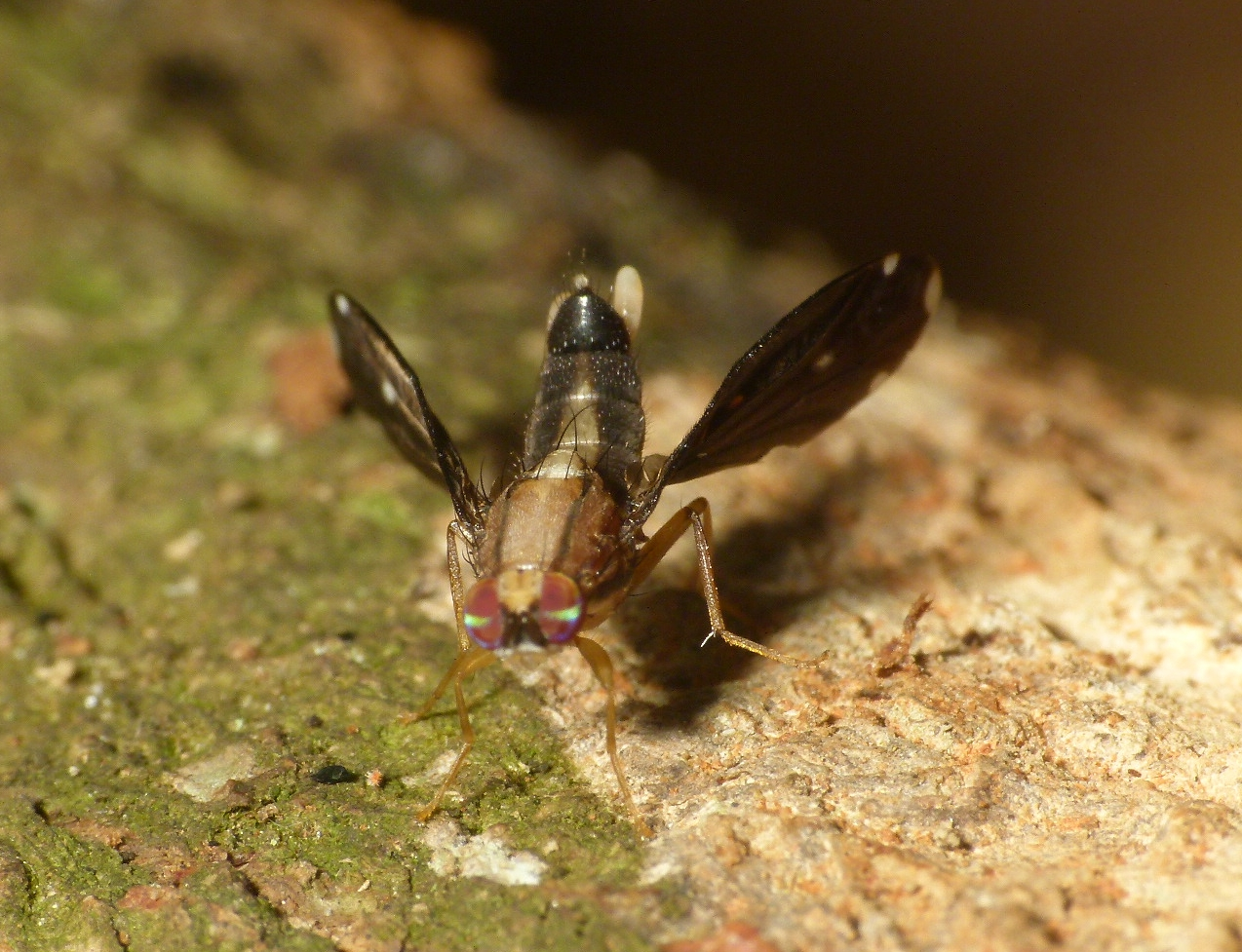
- Male Rioxa sexmaculata from India showing odour glands everted

Scientific classification
- Kingdom: Animalia
- Phylum: Arthropoda
- Class: Insecta
- Order: Diptera
- Family: Tephritidae
- Subfamily: Phytalmiinae
- Tribe: Acanthonevrini
- Genus: Rioxa; Walker, 1856

Species
- See text

= Rioxa =

Genus of flies

Rioxa is a genus of tephritid (fruit flies) in the family Tephritidae. The genera Rioxa and related Hexacinia and Cribrorioxa are distributed in South and Southeast Asia from India and Sri Lanka in the west to the Philippines. Only a few species extend east of Borneo to New Guinea and the Bismarck Archipelago. Rioxa breeds on fallen logs inside forests.

Male Rioxa sexmaculata display on suitable fallen logs with bark beetle holes by inflating pleural vesicles at the base of abdominal segment 5 and raising their abdomen and walk in circle around a spot. They are thought to exude pheromones which attract females. After copulation the male guards the female which lays its eggs in the holes made by bark beetles.

== Species ==
- Rioxa discalis (Walker, 1861)
- Rioxa erebus Rondani, 1875
- Rioxa lanceolata Walker, 1856
- Rioxa lucifer Hering, 1941
- Rioxa manto (Osten Sacken, 1882)
- Rioxa megispilota Hardy, 1970
- Rioxa sexmaculata (Wulp, 1880)
- Rioxa vinnula Hardy, 1973
