= H. flavescens =

H. flavescens may refer to:

- Haliclona flavescens, a marine demosponge
- Halisidota flavescens, a North American moth
- Haloa flavescens, a bubble snail
- Halone flavescens, an Indian moth
- Haminoea flavescens, a bubble snail
- Harpalus flavescens, a ground beetle
- Hedychium flavescens, a perennial ginger
- Helcystogramma flavescens, a Russian moth
- Heleophis flavescens, a water snake
- Heliothis flavescens, an African moth
- Hesperilla flavescens, an Australian butterfly
- Heteroclinus flavescens, a Pacific clinid
- Heteronygmia flavescens, a tussock moth
- Hibana flavescens, an anyphaenid sac spiders
- Homoranthus flavescens, a myrtle endemic to New South Wales
- Hoplopheromerus flavescens, a robber fly
- Hygrocybe flavescens, a waxy cap
- Hygrophorus flavescens, a waxy cap
- Hyllus flavescens, a jumping spider
- Hylorana flavescens, a true frog
- Hymenopappus flavescens, a North American plant
- Hypocnemis flavescens, a South American antbird
- Hypoestes flavescens, a flowering plant
- Hypomyces flavescens, a parasitic fungus
