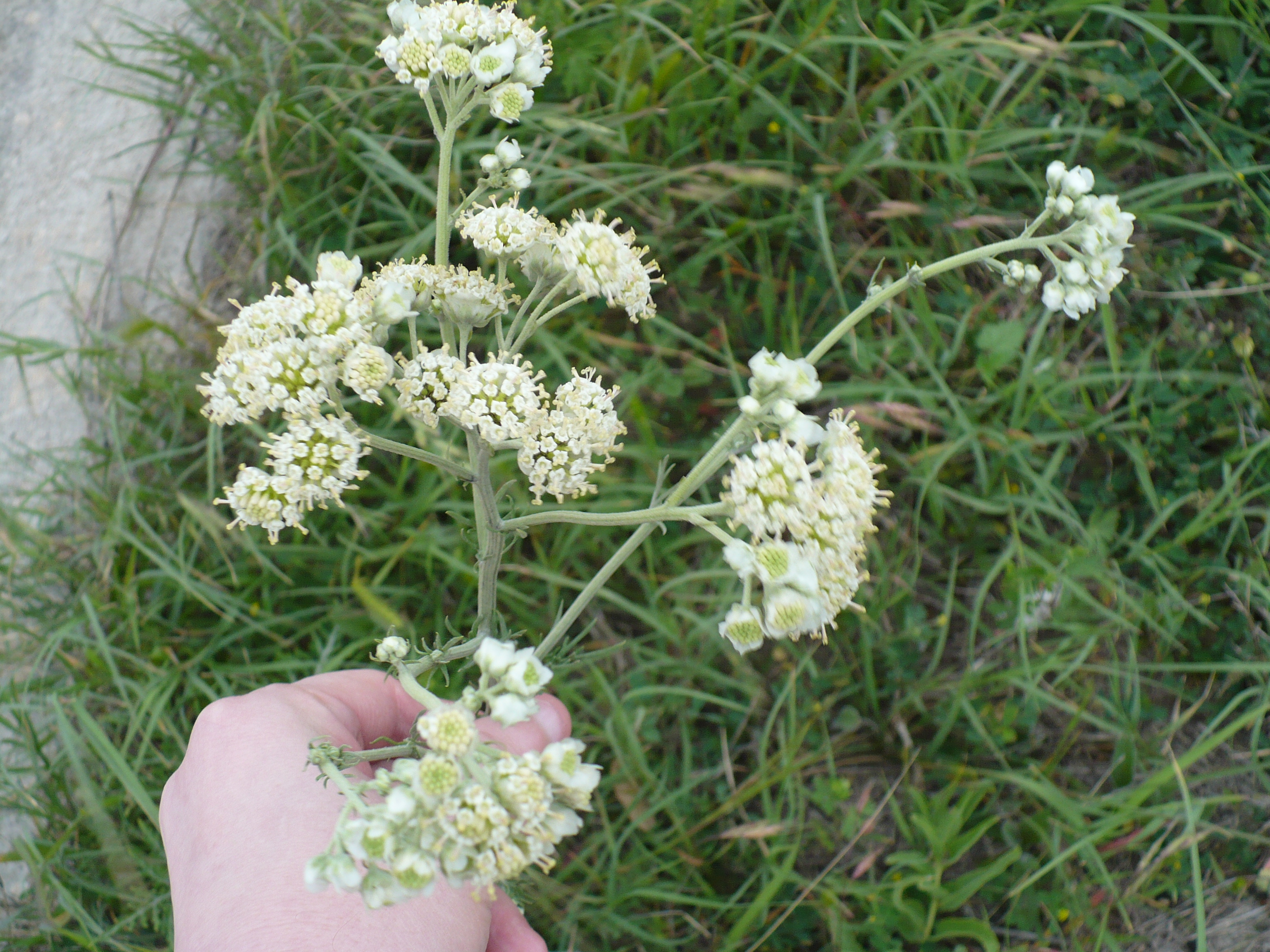

Scientific classification
- Kingdom: Plantae
- Clade: Tracheophytes
- Clade: Angiosperms
- Clade: Eudicots
- Clade: Asterids
- Order: Asterales
- Family: Asteraceae
- Genus: Hymenopappus
- Species: H. scabiosaeus

Binomial name
- Hymenopappus scabiosaeus L'Hér. 1788

Synonyms
- Hymenopappus carolinensis (Lam.) Porter; Rothia carolinensis Lam.; Hymenopappus corymbosus Torr. & A.Gray; Rothia corymbosa (Torr. & A.Gray) Kuntze

= Hymenopappus scabiosaeus =

Species of flowering plant

Hymenopappus scabiosaeus, the Carolina woollywhite, is a North American species of flowering plant in the daisy family. It grows in the central and southeastern United States, primarily on the Great Plains an on the Coastal Plain of the Southeast. There are also isolated populations in Illinois and Indiana as well as in the state of Coahuila in northern Mexico.

Hymenopappus scabiosaeus is a biennial herb up to 150 cm (5 feet) tall. It produces 20-100 flower heads per stem, each head with 20-80 white disc flowers but no ray flowers.

Varieties

- Hymenopappus scabiosaeus var. corymbosus (Torr. & A.Gray) B.L.Turner - Kansas, Nebraska, Oklahoma, Texas, Coahuila
- Hymenopappus scabiosaeus var. scabiosaeus - Alabama, Arkansas, Florida, Georgia, Illinois, Indiana, Mississippi, Missouri, Oklahoma, South Carolina
