= Hymenopappus flavomarginatus =

Scientific classification
- Kingdom: Plantae
- Clade: Tracheophytes
- Clade: Angiosperms
- Clade: Eudicots
- Clade: Asterids
- Order: Asterales
- Family: Asteraceae
- Genus: Hymenopappus
- Species: H. flavomarginatus

Binomial name
- Hymenopappus flavomarginatus I.M.Johnst. 1923

Species of flowering plant

Hymenopappus flavomarginatus is a North American species of flowering plant in the daisy family.

It grows in northern Mexico, in the states of Nuevo León, Coahuila, and San Luis Potosí.

== Description ==
Hymenopappus flavomarginatus is a biennial herb up to 100 cm (39 in) tall. It has very narrow divided leaves, resembling branching threads.

Each plant produces numerous flower heads in a flat-topped cluster, each head with 40-50 yellow disc flowers but no ray flowers.
