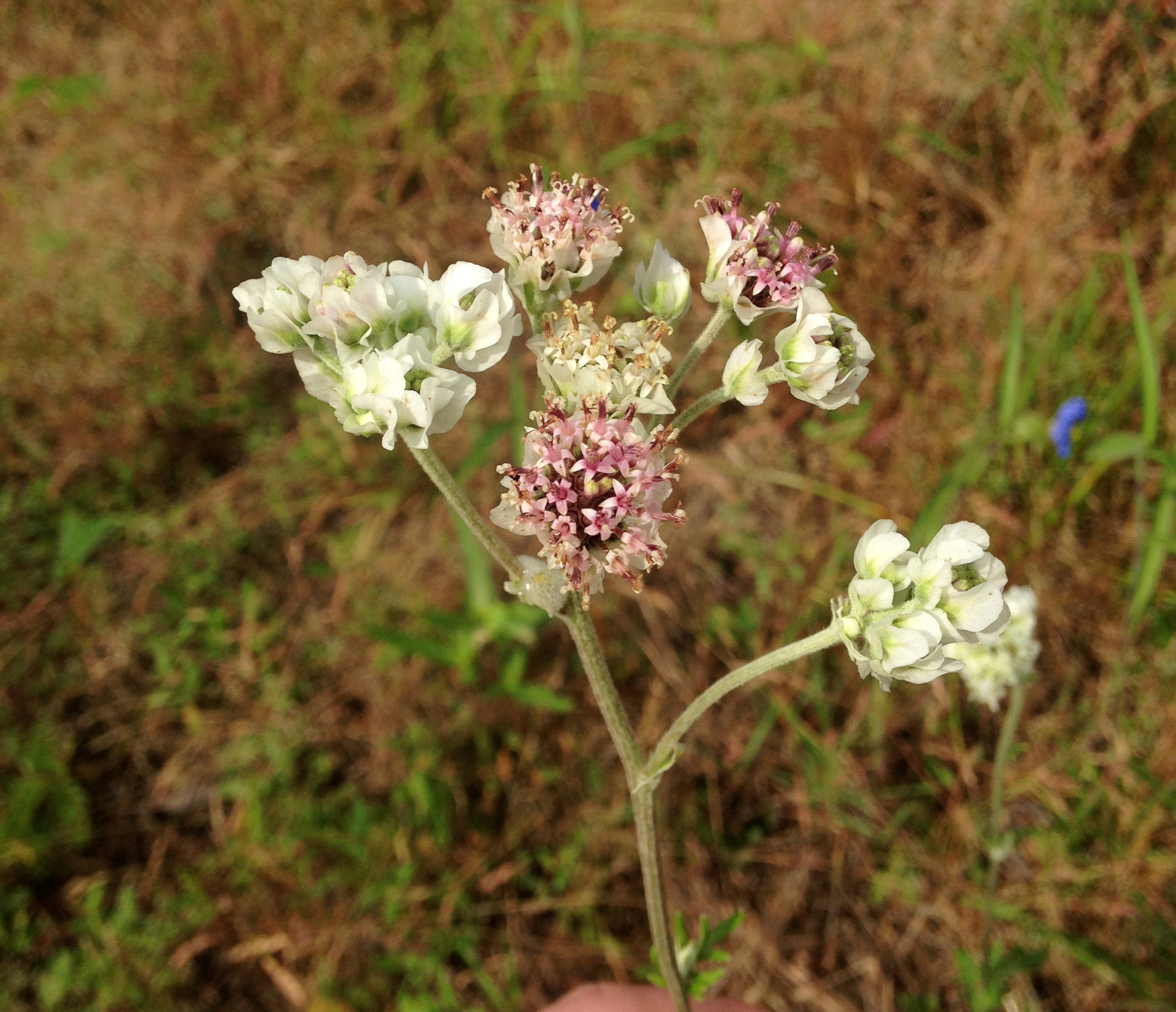

Scientific classification
- Kingdom: Plantae
- Clade: Tracheophytes
- Clade: Angiosperms
- Clade: Eudicots
- Clade: Asterids
- Order: Asterales
- Family: Asteraceae
- Genus: Hymenopappus
- Species: H. artemisiifolius

Binomial name
- Hymenopappus artemisiifolius DC. 1836

Synonyms
- Hymenopappus artemisiaefolius DC.; Hymenopappus scabiosaeus var. artemisiifolius (DC.) Gandhi & R.D. Thomas; Rothia artemisiifolia (DC.) Kuntze; Hymenopappus scabiosaeus var. riograndensis (B.L.Turner) Gandhi

= Hymenopappus artemisiifolius =

Species of flowering plant

Hymenopappus artemisiifolius, the oldplainsman or wooly-white, is a North American species of flowering plant in the daisy family. It has been found only in the south-central United States, in Texas, Arkansas, and Louisiana. Its natural habitat is in sandy soils of prairies and open woodlands.

Hymenopappus artemisiifolius is a biennial herb up to 100 cm (39 in) tall. It produces 20-60 flower heads per stem, each head with 40–60 white, yellow, purple, or red disc flowers but no ray flowers. Its flowers attract butterflies.

Varieties

- Hymenopappus artemisiifolius var. artemisiifolius - Texas, Arkansas, Louisiana
- Hymenopappus artemisiifolius var. riograndensis B.L.Turner - Río Grande Valley in southern Texas
