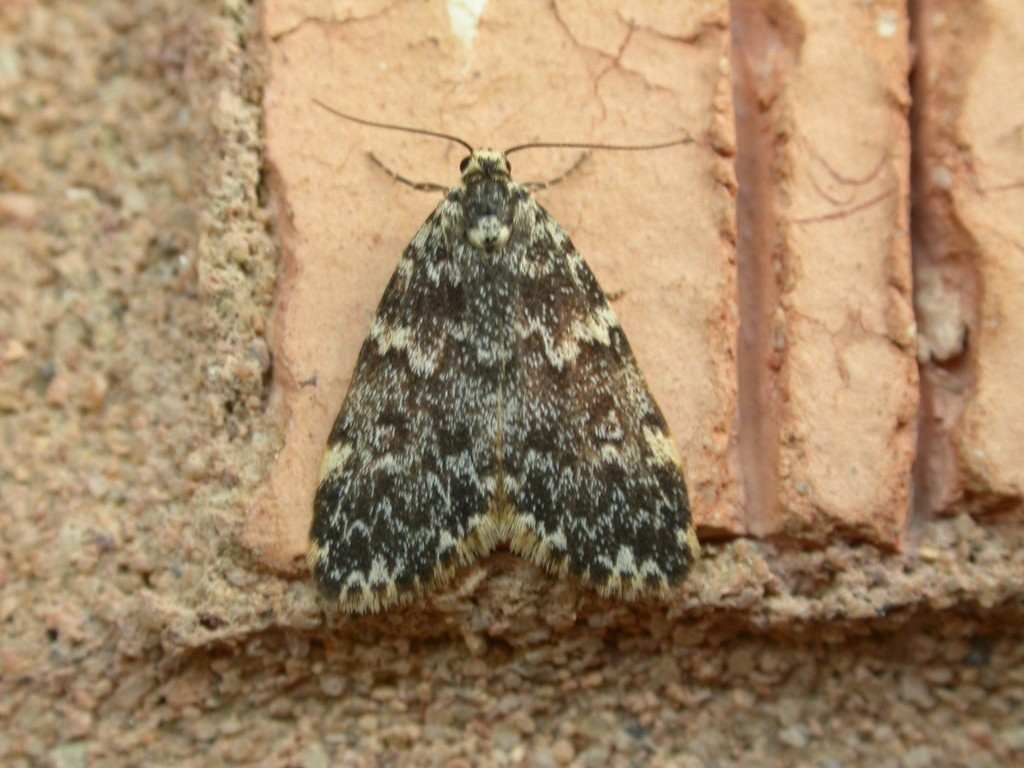

Scientific classification
- Domain: Eukaryota
- Kingdom: Animalia
- Phylum: Arthropoda
- Class: Insecta
- Order: Lepidoptera
- Superfamily: Noctuoidea
- Family: Erebidae
- Subfamily: Arctiinae
- Genus: Halone
- Species: H. coryphoea

Binomial name
- Halone coryphoea Hampson, 1914

Synonyms
- Halone farinosa Strand, 1922

= Halone coryphoea =

Species of moth

Halone coryphoea is a moth of the subfamily Arctiinae first described by George Hampson in 1914. It is found in Australia.
