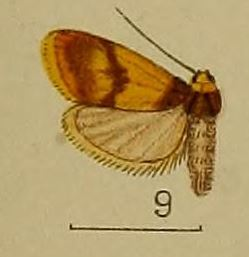

Scientific classification
- Kingdom: Animalia
- Phylum: Arthropoda
- Class: Insecta
- Order: Lepidoptera
- Superfamily: Noctuoidea
- Family: Erebidae
- Subfamily: Arctiinae
- Genus: Halone
- Species: H. flavinigra

Binomial name
- Halone flavinigra Hampson, 1907

= Halone flavinigra =

Species of moth

Halone flavinigra is a moth of the subfamily Arctiinae. It was described by George Hampson in 1907. It is known from India.
