= Halone sinuata =

Scientific classification
- Kingdom: Animalia
- Phylum: Arthropoda
- Class: Insecta
- Order: Lepidoptera
- Superfamily: Noctuoidea
- Family: Erebidae
- Subfamily: Arctiinae
- Genus: Halone
- Species: H. sinuata

Binomial name
- Halone sinuata (Wallengren, 1860)

Synonyms
- Setina sinuata Wallengren, 1860; Mosoda anartoides Walker, 1866

Species of moth

Halone sinuata, the rock lichen moth, is a moth of the subfamily Arctiinae. It was described by Hans Daniel Johan Wallengren in 1860. It is found in Australia.

The wingspan is about 20 mm.

The larvae feed on moulds, lichen and algae. They rest during the day and feed at night. The larvae are speckled with light and dark grey and are covered with hairs.
