= Halone sobria =

Scientific classification
- Kingdom: Animalia
- Phylum: Arthropoda
- Class: Insecta
- Order: Lepidoptera
- Superfamily: Noctuoidea
- Family: Erebidae
- Subfamily: Arctiinae
- Genus: Halone
- Species: H. sobria

Binomial name
- Halone sobria Walker, 1854

Synonyms
- Halone nephobola Turner, 1944

Species of moth

Halone sobria is a moth of the subfamily Arctiinae. It was described by Francis Walker in 1854. It is found in Australia.
