= Hymenopappus radiatus =

Scientific classification
- Kingdom: Plantae
- Clade: Tracheophytes
- Clade: Angiosperms
- Clade: Eudicots
- Clade: Asterids
- Order: Asterales
- Family: Asteraceae
- Genus: Hymenopappus
- Species: H. radiatus

Binomial name
- Hymenopappus radiatus Rose 1891

Synonyms
- Hymenopappus radiata Rose

Species of flowering plant

Hymenopappus radiatus, the ray hymenopappus, is a North American species of flowering plant in the daisy family.

It is endemic to the state of Arizona, in the southwestern United States.

== Description ==
Hymenopappus radiatus is a perennial herb up to 45 cm (18 in) tall. One plant produces 6-8 flower heads per stem, each head 8 white ray flowers surrounding 30–50 yellow disc flowers.
