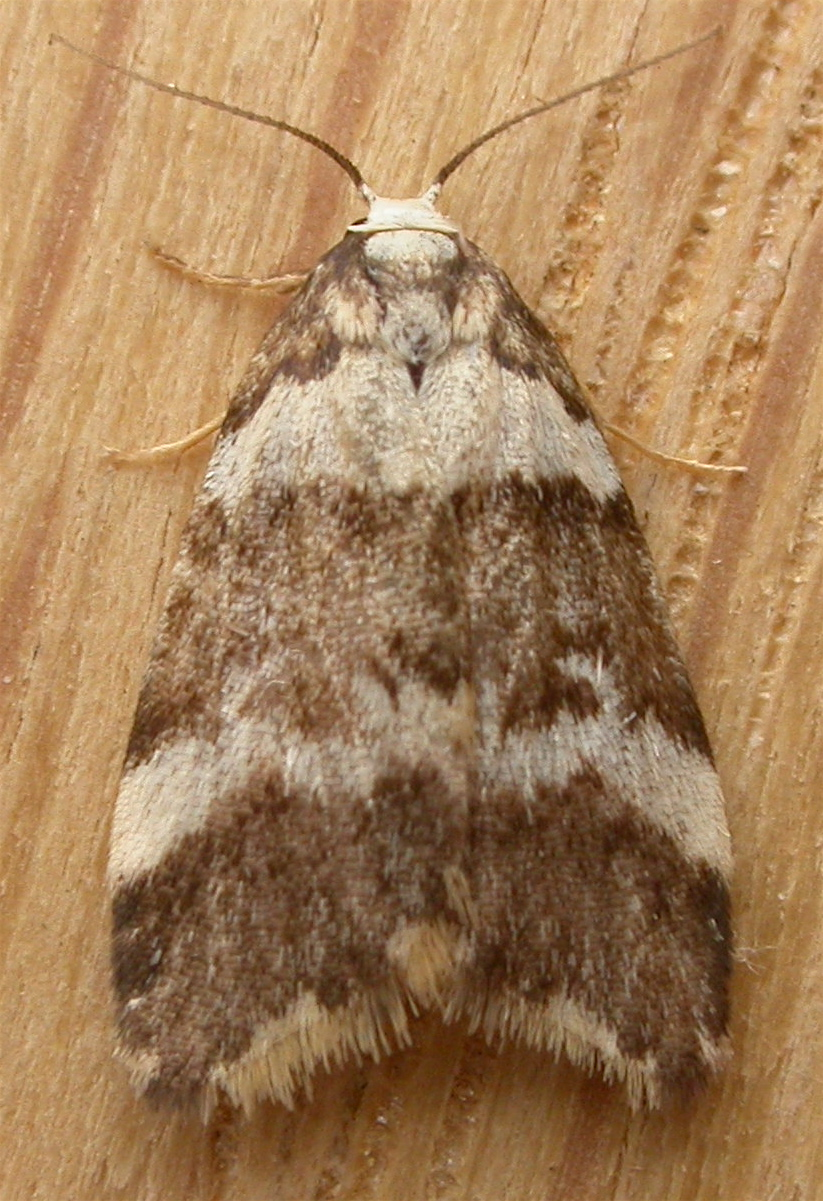

Scientific classification
- Domain: Eukaryota
- Kingdom: Animalia
- Phylum: Arthropoda
- Class: Insecta
- Order: Lepidoptera
- Superfamily: Noctuoidea
- Family: Erebidae
- Subfamily: Arctiinae
- Genus: Halone
- Species: H. sejuncta

Binomial name
- Halone sejuncta (R. Felder & Rogenhofer, 1875)

Synonyms
- Pitane sejuncta Felder & Rogenhofer, 1875

= Halone sejuncta =

Species of moth

Halone sejuncta, the variable halone, is a moth of the subfamily Arctiinae first described by Rudolf Felder and Alois Friedrich Rogenhofer in 1875. It is found in Australia in Queensland, New South Wales, the Australian Capital Territory, Victoria, Tasmania and South Australia.

The forewings are dark brown with two ragged white bands.
