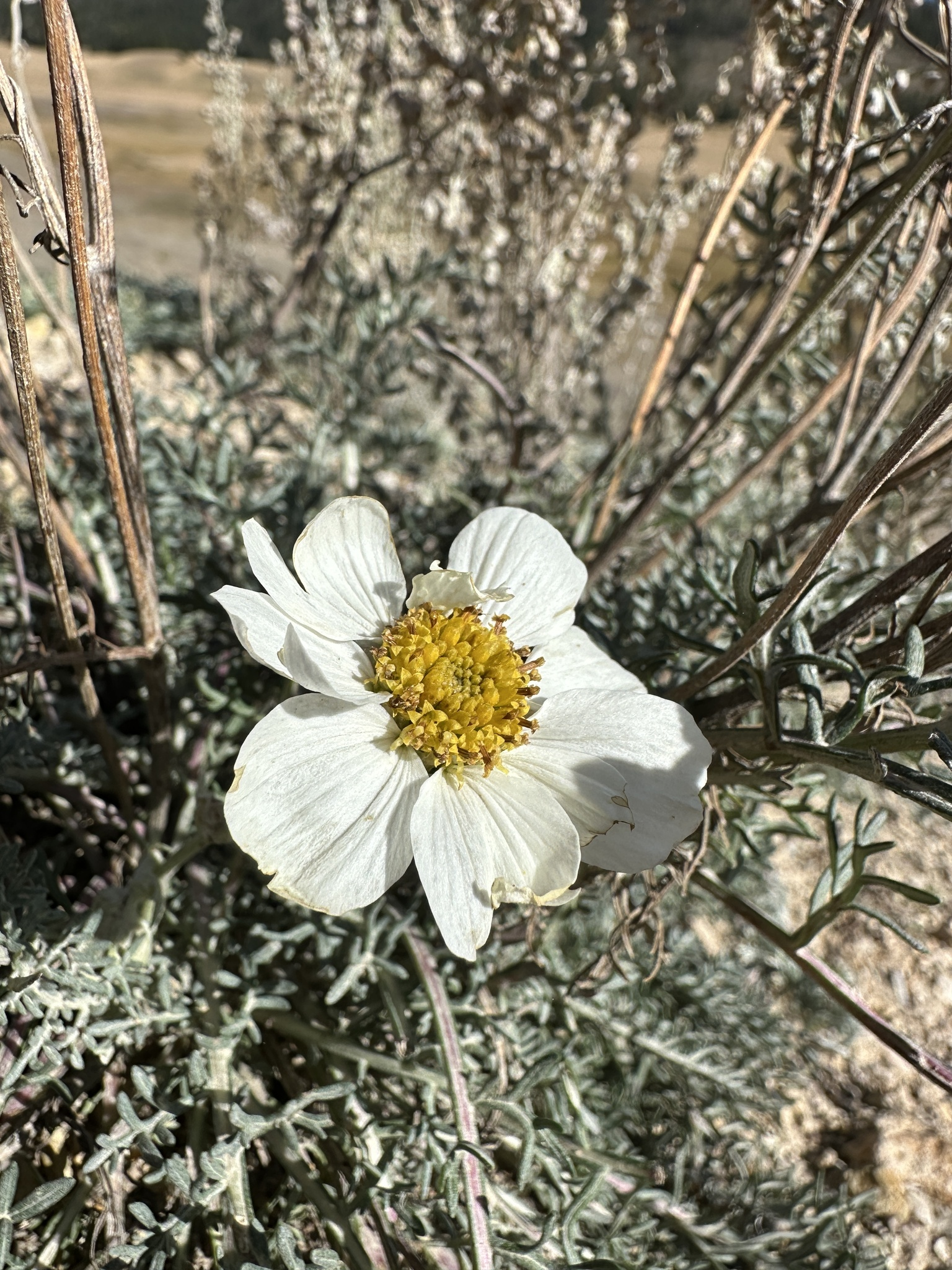

Conservation status
- Apparently Secure (NatureServe)

Scientific classification
- Kingdom: Plantae
- Clade: Tracheophytes
- Clade: Angiosperms
- Clade: Eudicots
- Clade: Asterids
- Order: Asterales
- Family: Asteraceae
- Genus: Hymenopappus
- Species: H. newberryi

Binomial name
- Hymenopappus newberryi (A.Gray ex Porter & J.M.Coult.) I.M.Johnst. 1923

Synonyms
- Leucampyx newberryi A. Gray ex Porter & J.M. Coult. 1874

= Hymenopappus newberryi =

Species of flowering plant

Hymenopappus newberryi, or Newberry's hymenopappus, is a North American species of flowering plant in the daisy family. It grows in the states of New Mexico and Colorado in the southwestern United States.

Hymenopappus newberryi is a perennial herb up to 60 cm (2 feet) tall. One plant produces 3-8 flower heads per stem, each head 8 white or pink ray flowers surrounding 60–150 yellow disc flowers.
