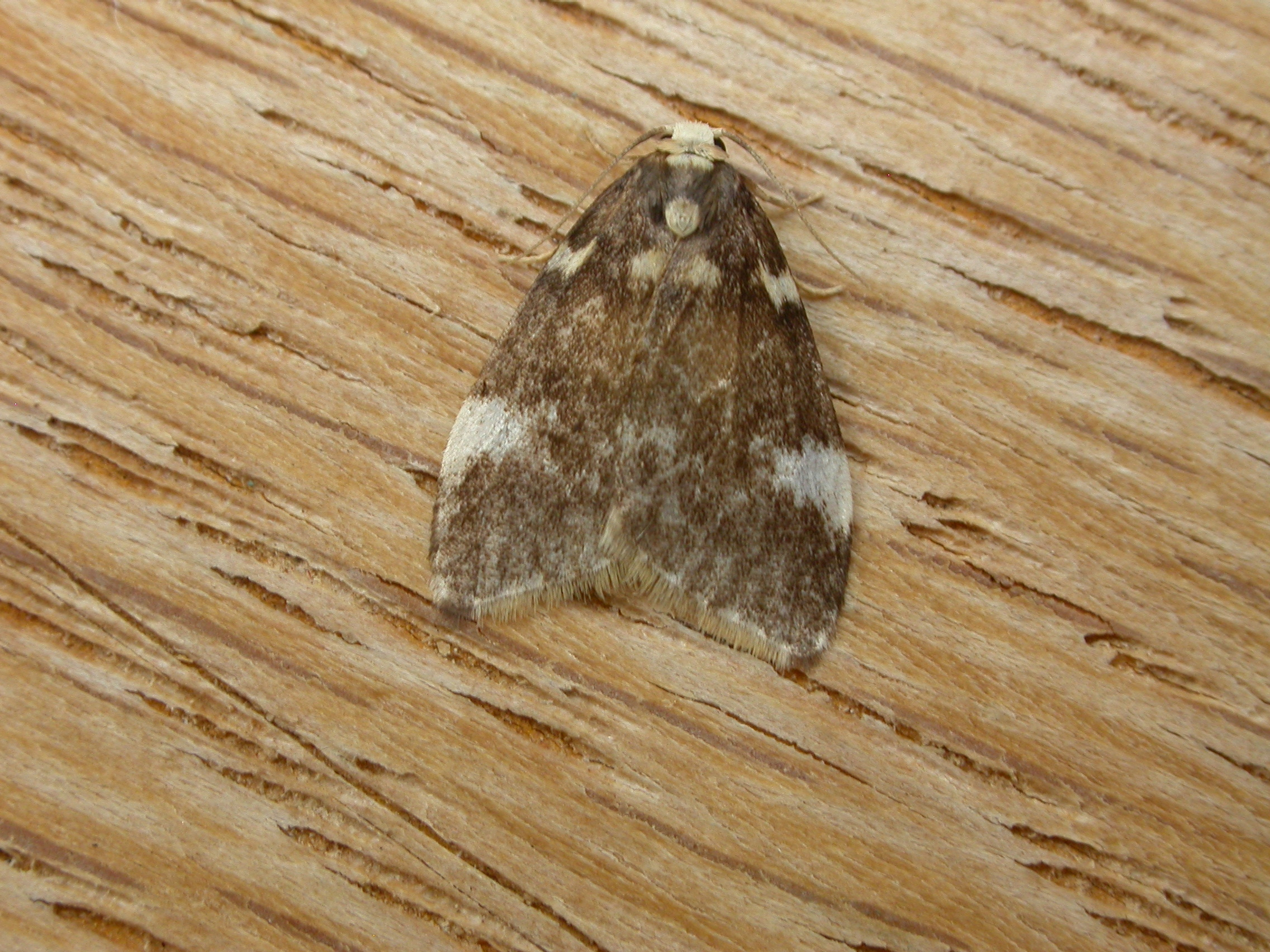

Scientific classification
- Domain: Eukaryota
- Kingdom: Animalia
- Phylum: Arthropoda
- Class: Insecta
- Order: Lepidoptera
- Superfamily: Noctuoidea
- Family: Erebidae
- Subfamily: Arctiinae
- Genus: Halone
- Species: H. pteridaula

Binomial name
- Halone pteridaula (Turner, 1922)

Synonyms
- Eurypepla pteridaula Turner, 1922

= Halone pteridaula =

Species of moth

Halone pteridaula, the brown halone, is a species of moth of the subfamily Arctiinae first described by Alfred Jefferis Turner in 1922. It is known from the Australian Capital Territory, New South Wales, Queensland, Tasmania and Victoria, all in Australia.

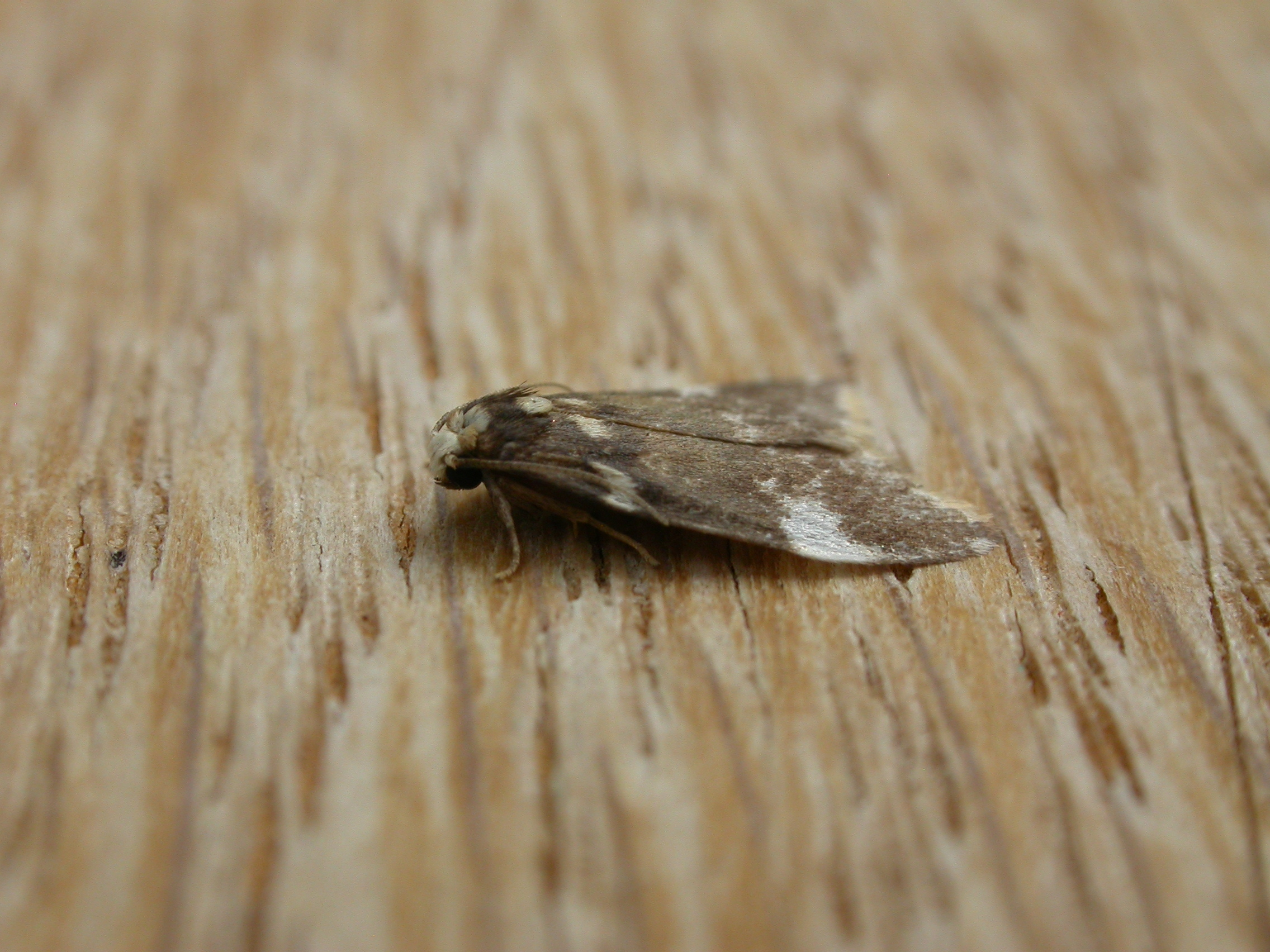
