= Halone servilis =

Scientific classification
- Kingdom: Animalia
- Phylum: Arthropoda
- Class: Insecta
- Order: Lepidoptera
- Superfamily: Noctuoidea
- Family: Erebidae
- Subfamily: Arctiinae
- Genus: Halone
- Species: H. servilis

Binomial name
- Halone servilis (Meyrick, 1886)

Synonyms
- Mosoda servilis Meyrick, 1886

Species of moth

Halone servilis is a moth of the subfamily Arctiinae. It was described by Edward Meyrick in 1886. It is found in Australia.
