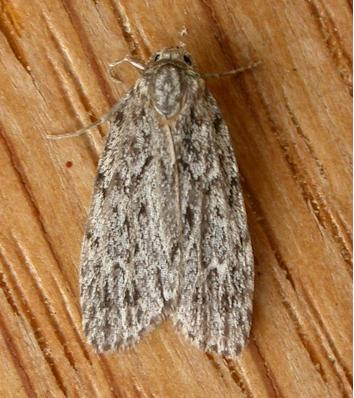
- Halone prosenes

Scientific classification
- Kingdom: Animalia
- Phylum: Arthropoda
- Class: Insecta
- Order: Lepidoptera
- Superfamily: Noctuoidea
- Family: Erebidae
- Subfamily: Arctiinae
- Tribe: Lithosiini
- Genus: Halone; Walker, 1854

Type species
- Halone sobria Walker, 1854

Synonyms
- Mosoda Walker, 1866; Eurypepla Turner, 1922; Eurypeplella Hedicke, 1923

= Halone =

Genus of moths

Halone is a genus of moths in the subfamily Arctiinae from southern Asia and Australia. The genus was erected by Francis Walker in 1854.

== Species ==
- Halone consolatrix (Rosenstock, 1899) (Australia)
- Halone coryphoea Hampson, 1914 (Australia)
- Halone diffusifascia (Swinhoe, 1896) (Assam)
- Halone ebaea Hampson, 1914 (Australia)
- Halone epiopsis Turner, 1940 (Australia)
- Halone flavescens (Hampson, 1898) (India)
- Halone flavinigra Hampson 1907 (India)
- Halone interspersa (T. P. Lucas, 1890) (Australia)
- Halone ophiodes (Meyrick, 1886) (Australia)
- Halone prosenes Turner, 1940 (Australia)
- Halone pteridaula (Turner, 1922) (Australia)
- Halone sejuncta (Felder & Rogenhofer, 1875) (Australia)
- Halone servilis (Meyrick, 1886) (Australia)
- Halone sinuata (Wallengren, 1860) (Australia)
- Halone sobria Walker, 1854 (Australia)
