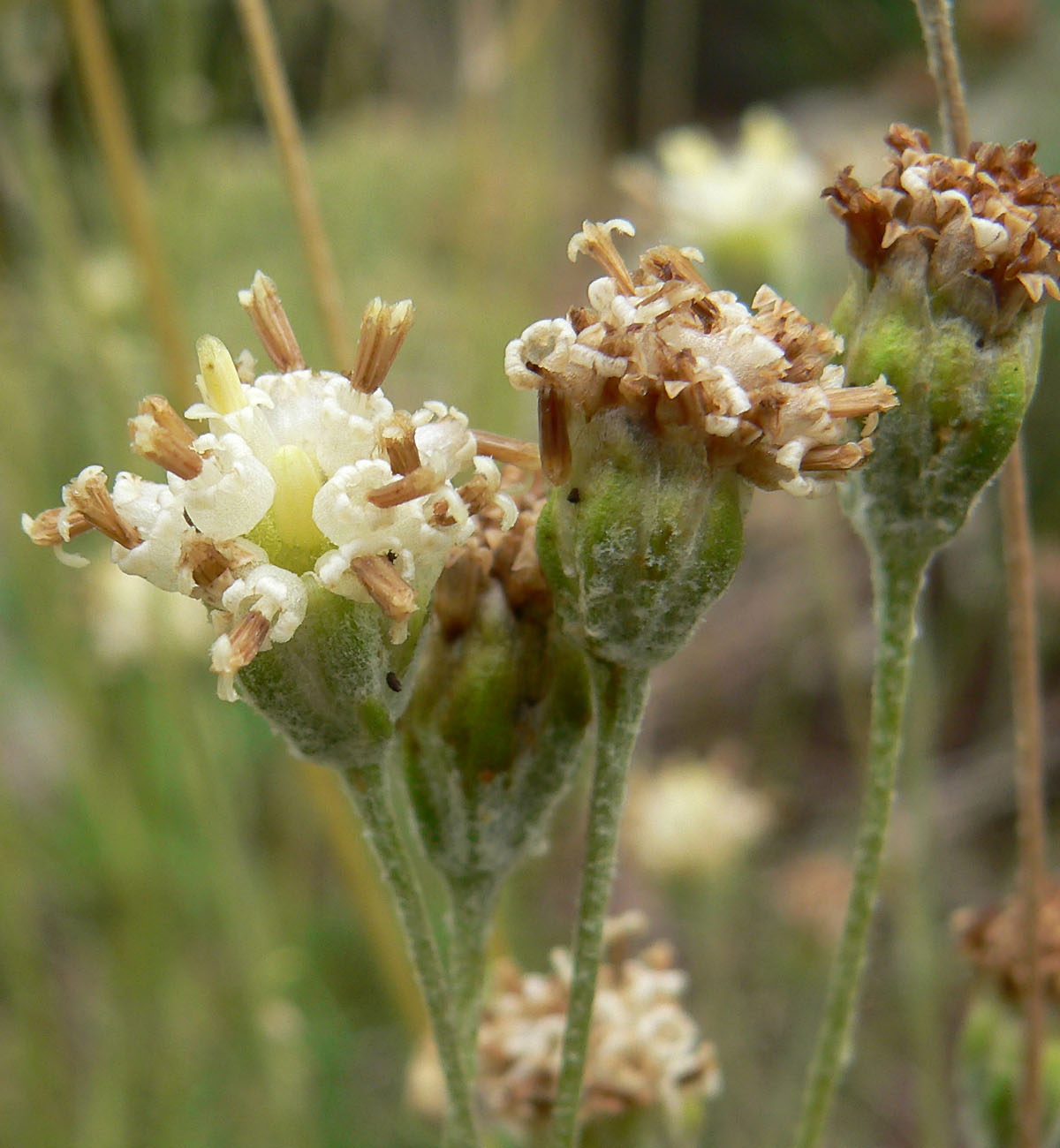
- Hymenopappus filifolius var. eriopodus

Conservation status
- Secure (NatureServe)

Scientific classification
- Kingdom: Plantae
- Clade: Tracheophytes
- Clade: Angiosperms
- Clade: Eudicots
- Clade: Asterids
- Order: Asterales
- Family: Asteraceae
- Genus: Hymenopappus
- Species: H. filifolius

Binomial name
- Hymenopappus filifolius Hook.

Synonyms
- Synonymy: Hymenopappus arenosus A.Heller; Hymenopappus cinereus Rydb.; Hymenopappus eriopoda A. Nelson; Hymenopappus eriopodus A.Nelson; Hymenopappus gloriosus A.Heller; Hymenopappus lugens Greene; Hymenopappus luteus Nutt.; Hymenopappus nanus Rydb.; Hymenopappus nudipes Maguire; Hymenopappus parvulus Greene; Hymenopappus pauciflorus I.M.Johnst.; Hymenopappus polycephalus Osterh.; Hymenopappus tomentosus Rydb.

= Hymenopappus filifolius =

Species of flowering plant

Hymenopappus filifolius is a North American species of flowering plant in the daisy family known by the common names fineleaf hymenopappus and Columbia cutleaf. It is native to western and central North America from Alberta and Saskatchewan south as far as Chihuahua and Baja California.

Hymenopappus filifolius grows in a number of habitats, often in arid regions. The plant is variable in appearance and there are a great number of varieties of the species. It is a taprooted perennial herb growing as a small clump on the ground to an erect spray of stems up to a meter (40 inches) tall. Almost all of the leaves are located at the base of the plant in a woolly gray-green patch. They are up to 20 centimeters (8 inches) long and are divided into blunt, thready leaflets. They are glandular and thinly hairy to quite woolly, and dark green under the coat of white wool. The stem ends in a branching inflorescence of knob-shaped discoid flower heads. They are filled with golden yellow or white disc florets. There are no ray florets.

There are many varieties, including:

- Hymenopappus filifolius var. cinereus - Arizona, Colorado, Utah, New Mexico, Texas
- Hymenopappus filifolius var. eriopodus – a white-flowered variety native from California, Nevada, Utah
- Hymenopappus filifolius var. filifolius – Idaho, Oregon, Washington
- Hymenopappus filifolius var. idahoensis – Idaho
- Hymenopappus filifolius var. lugens – Arizona, California, Nevada, Utah, New Mexico, Baja California
- Hymenopappus filifolius var. luteus – Utah, Wyoming, Colorado
- Hymenopappus filifolius var. megacephalus – California, Nevada, Utah, Arizona, Colorado
- Hymenopappus filifolius var. nanus – Arizona, California, Nevada, Utah
- Hymenopappus filifolius var. nudipes – Utah, Wyoming
- Hymenopappus filifolius var. parvulus – Colorado
- Hymenopappus filifolius var. pauciflorus – Utah, Arizona, Colorado
- Hymenopappus filifolius var. polycephalus – Alberta, Saskatchewan, Colorado, Kansas, Montana, Nebraska, North Dakota, South Dakota, Wyoming
- Hymenopappus filifolius var. tomentosus – Utah

== Uses ==
The Zuni people apply a poultice of chewed root with lard to swellings. They also drink a warm decoction of the root as an emetic. They also use the root as chewing gum.
