= Halone consolatrix =

Scientific classification
- Domain: Eukaryota
- Kingdom: Animalia
- Phylum: Arthropoda
- Class: Insecta
- Order: Lepidoptera
- Superfamily: Noctuoidea
- Family: Erebidae
- Subfamily: Arctiinae
- Genus: Halone
- Species: H. consolatrix

Binomial name
- Halone consolatrix (Rosenstock, 1899)

Synonyms
- Mosoda consolatrix Rosenstock, 1885; Mosoda hemichroa Turner, 1899

Species of moth

Halone consolatrix is a moth of the subfamily Arctiinae. It was described by Rudolph Rosenstock in 1899. It is found in Australia.
