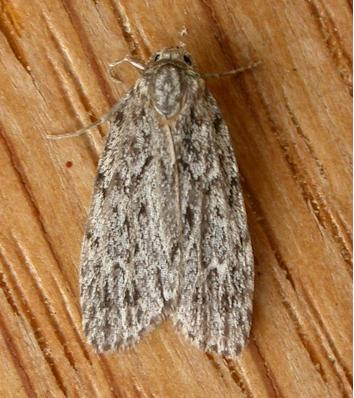

Scientific classification
- Kingdom: Animalia
- Phylum: Arthropoda
- Class: Insecta
- Order: Lepidoptera
- Superfamily: Noctuoidea
- Family: Erebidae
- Subfamily: Arctiinae
- Genus: Halone
- Species: H. prosenes

Binomial name
- Halone prosenes Turner, 1940

= Halone prosenes =

Species of moth

Halone prosenes, the pied halone, is a moth of the subfamily Arctiinae first described by Alfred Jefferis Turner in 1940. It is known from the Australian state of Victoria, where it is restricted to the South East Coastal Plain, South Eastern Highlands and the Victorian Volcanic Plain.
