= Hymenopappus carrizoanus =

Scientific classification
- Kingdom: Plantae
- Clade: Tracheophytes
- Clade: Angiosperms
- Clade: Eudicots
- Clade: Asterids
- Order: Asterales
- Family: Asteraceae
- Genus: Hymenopappus
- Species: H. carrizoanus

Binomial name
- Hymenopappus carrizoanus B.L.Turner 1989

Species of flowering plant

Hymenopappus carrizoanus, commonly known as the Carrizo Sands woolly white, is a North American species of flowering plant in the daisy family. This species is endemic to Texas, specifically found on the Carrizo Sands in the central part of the state.

Hymenopappus carrizoanus is a biennial herb up to 150 cm (5 feet) tall. It produces 45–60 flower heads per stem, each head containing 20–40 white disc flowers. Notably it lacks ray flowers.
