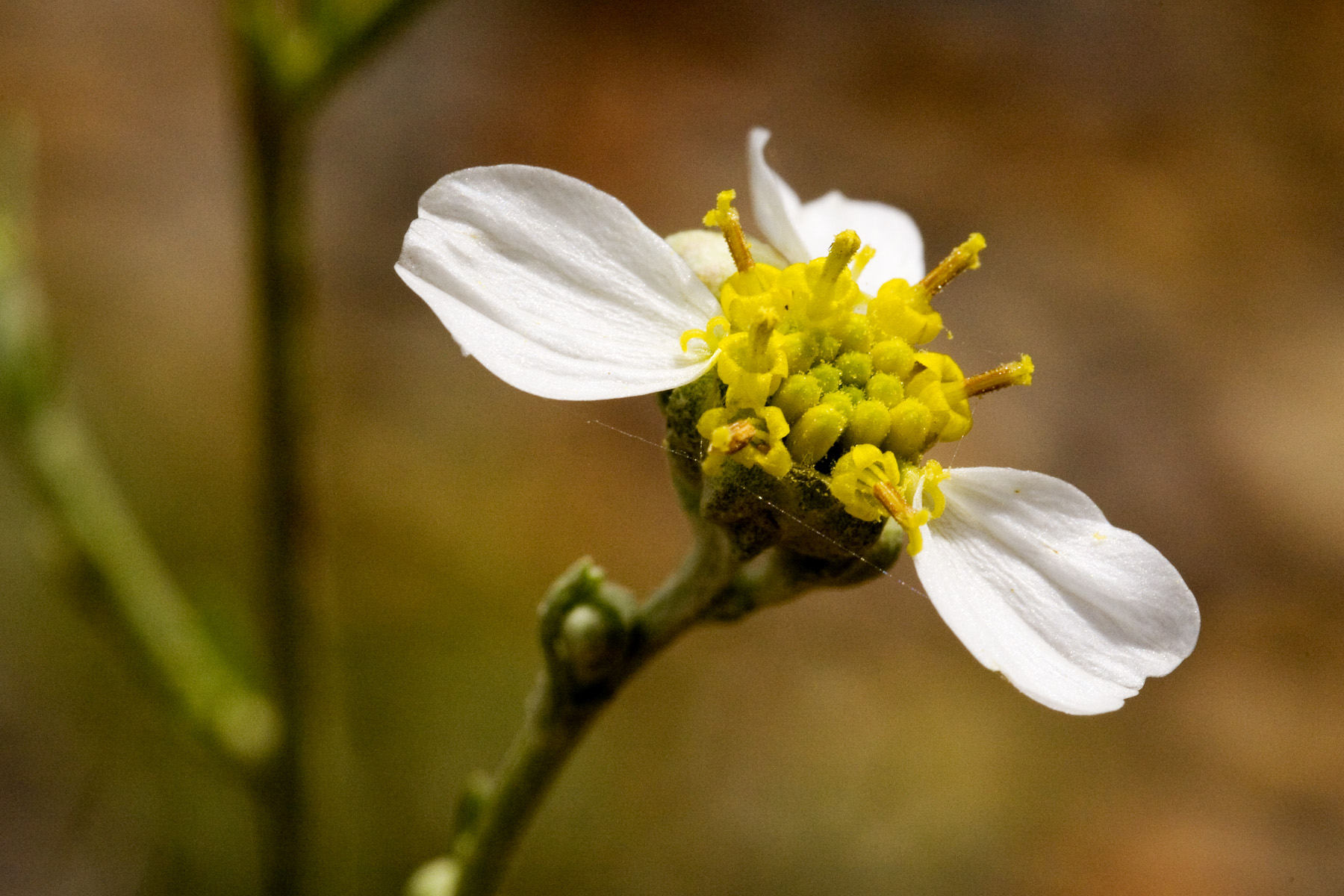

Scientific classification
- Kingdom: Plantae
- Clade: Embryophytes
- Clade: Tracheophytes
- Clade: Spermatophytes
- Clade: Angiosperms
- Clade: Eudicots
- Clade: Asterids
- Order: Asterales
- Family: Asteraceae
- Genus: Hymenopappus
- Species: H. biennis

Binomial name
- Hymenopappus biennis B.L.Turner 1956

= Hymenopappus biennis =

Species of flowering plant

Hymenopappus biennis, the biennial woollywhite, is a North American species of flowering plant in the daisy family. It has been found in New Mexico and western Texas.

Hymenopappus biennis is a biennial herb up to 100 cm (39 in) tall. It produces 20-40 flower heads per stem, each head with 8 white ray flowers surrounding 32–50 yellow disc flowers.
