= Hymenopappus hintoniorum =

Scientific classification
- Kingdom: Plantae
- Clade: Tracheophytes
- Clade: Angiosperms
- Clade: Eudicots
- Clade: Asterids
- Order: Asterales
- Family: Asteraceae
- Genus: Hymenopappus
- Species: H. hintoniorum

Binomial name
- Hymenopappus hintoniorum B.L.Turner 1985

Species of flowering plant

Hymenopappus hintoniorum is a North American species of flowering plant in the daisy family. It grows in northern Mexico, in the state of Coahuila.

Hymenopappus hintoniorum grows at high elevations (3000 meters (10,000 feet) or more above sea level) in the Sierra Madre Occidental. It is a biennial herb up to 150 cm (5 feet) tall. It has very narrow divided leaves, resembling branching threads. One plant produces numerous flower heads in flat-topped clusters, each head with 100 or more yellow disc flowers but no ray flowers.
