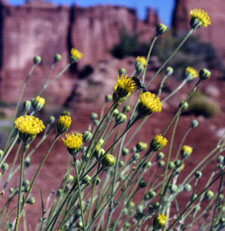
- Hymenopappus filifolius

Scientific classification
- Kingdom: Plantae
- Clade: Tracheophytes
- Clade: Angiosperms
- Clade: Eudicots
- Clade: Asterids
- Order: Asterales
- Family: Asteraceae
- Subfamily: Asteroideae
- Tribe: Bahieae
- Genus: Hymenopappus; L'Hér. 1788

Synonyms
- Leucampyx A.Gray ex Benth. & Hook.f.; Rothia Lam.

= Hymenopappus =

Genus of flowering plants

Hymenopappus is a genus of flowering plants in the daisy family. Many species are known as woollywhites.

Hymenopappus is native to North America, ranging from Alberta and Saskatchewan in west-central Canada through the western, central, and southeastern United States to northern Mexico. These are biennial or perennial herbs which bear daisylike flowers.

== Species ==
13 species are accepted.

- Hymenopappus artemisiifolius - oldplainsman - Texas Arkansas Louisiana
- Hymenopappus biennis - biennial woollywhite - New Mexico Texas
- Hymenopappus carrii B.L.Turner – Texas
- Hymenopappus carrizoanus - Carrizo Sands woollywhite - Texas
- Hymenopappus filifolius - fineleaf hymenopappus - Texas + northern Baja California to Alberta + Saskatchewan
- Hymenopappus flavescens - collegeflower - Arizona New Mexico Texas Oklahoma Colorado Kansas, Chihuahua
- Hymenopappus flavomarginatus - Coahuila, Nuevo León, San Luis Potosí
- Hymenopappus hintoniorum - Coahuila
- Hymenopappus mexicanus - Mexican woollywhite - Arizona New Mexico, Chihuahua, San Luis Potosí
- Hymenopappus newberryi - Newberry's woollywhite - New Mexico Colorado
- Hymenopappus radiatus - ray hymenopappus - Arizona New Mexico
- Hymenopappus scabiosaeus - Carolina woollywhite - Texas Arkansas Louisiana Oklahoma Missouri Kansas Nebraska Illinois Indiana Mississippi Alabama Georgia Florida South Carolina, Coahuila, Chihuahua
- Hymenopappus tenuifolius - Chalk Hill woollywhite - Texas New Mexico Oklahoma Colorado Kansas Nebraska South Dakota Wyoming
