= Halone ebaea =

Scientific classification
- Kingdom: Animalia
- Phylum: Arthropoda
- Class: Insecta
- Order: Lepidoptera
- Superfamily: Noctuoidea
- Family: Erebidae
- Subfamily: Arctiinae
- Genus: Halone
- Species: H. ebaea

Binomial name
- Halone ebaea Hampson, 1914

Species of moth

Halone ebaea is a moth of the subfamily Arctiinae. It was described by George Hampson in 1914. It is found in Australia.
