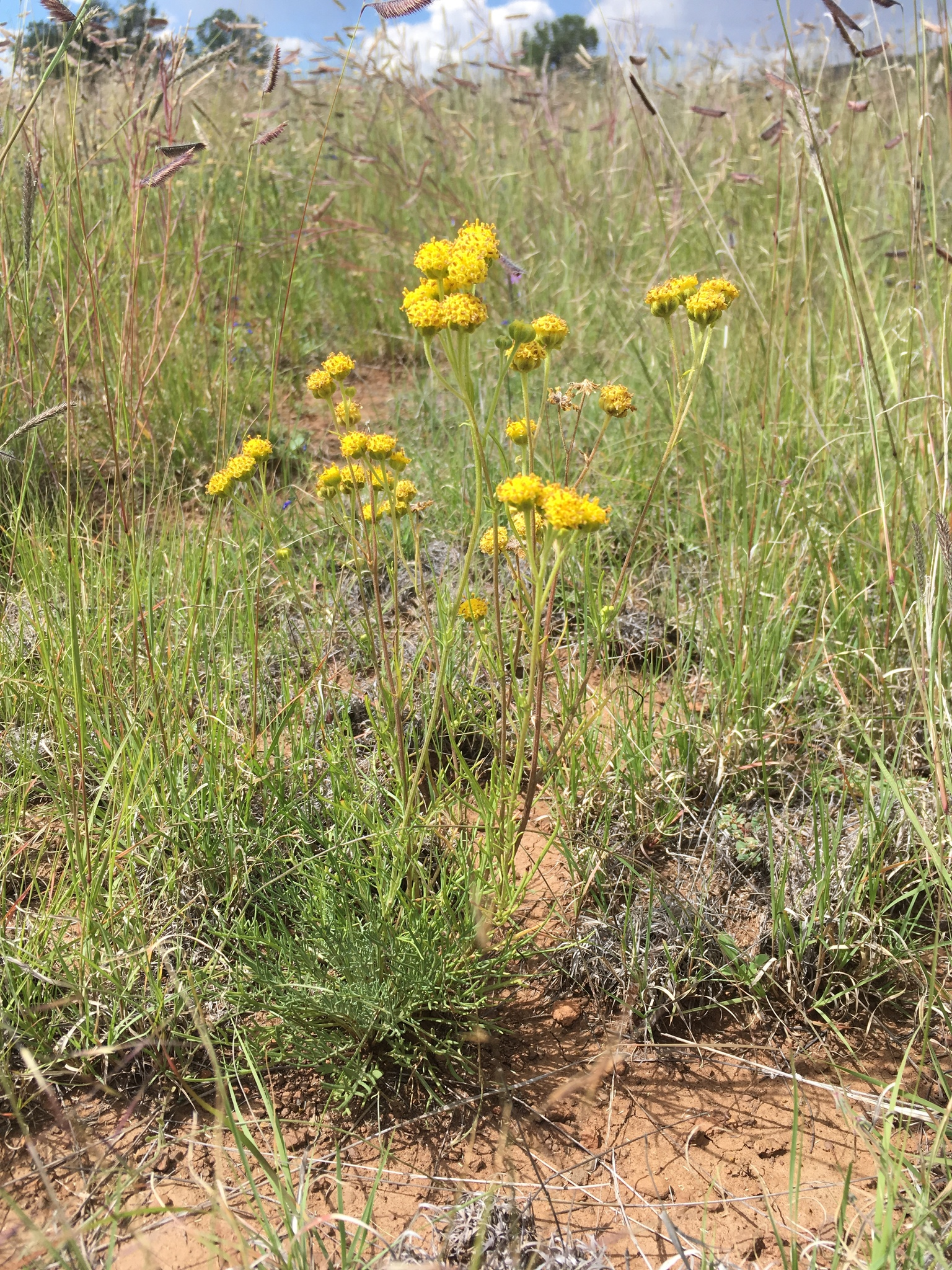

Scientific classification
- Kingdom: Plantae
- Clade: Tracheophytes
- Clade: Angiosperms
- Clade: Eudicots
- Clade: Asterids
- Order: Asterales
- Family: Asteraceae
- Genus: Hymenopappus
- Species: H. mexicanus

Binomial name
- Hymenopappus mexicanus A.Gray 1883

= Hymenopappus mexicanus =

Species of flowering plant

Hymenopappus mexicanus, the Mexican woollywhite, is a North American species of flowering plant in the daisy family. It grows in northern Mexico (Chihuahua, San Luis Potosí) and the southwestern United States (Arizona, New Mexico).

Hymenopappus mexicanus is a biennial herb up to 90 cm (3 feet) tall. One plant produces 1-20 flower heads per stem, each head with 20-40 yellow disc flowers but no ray flowers.
