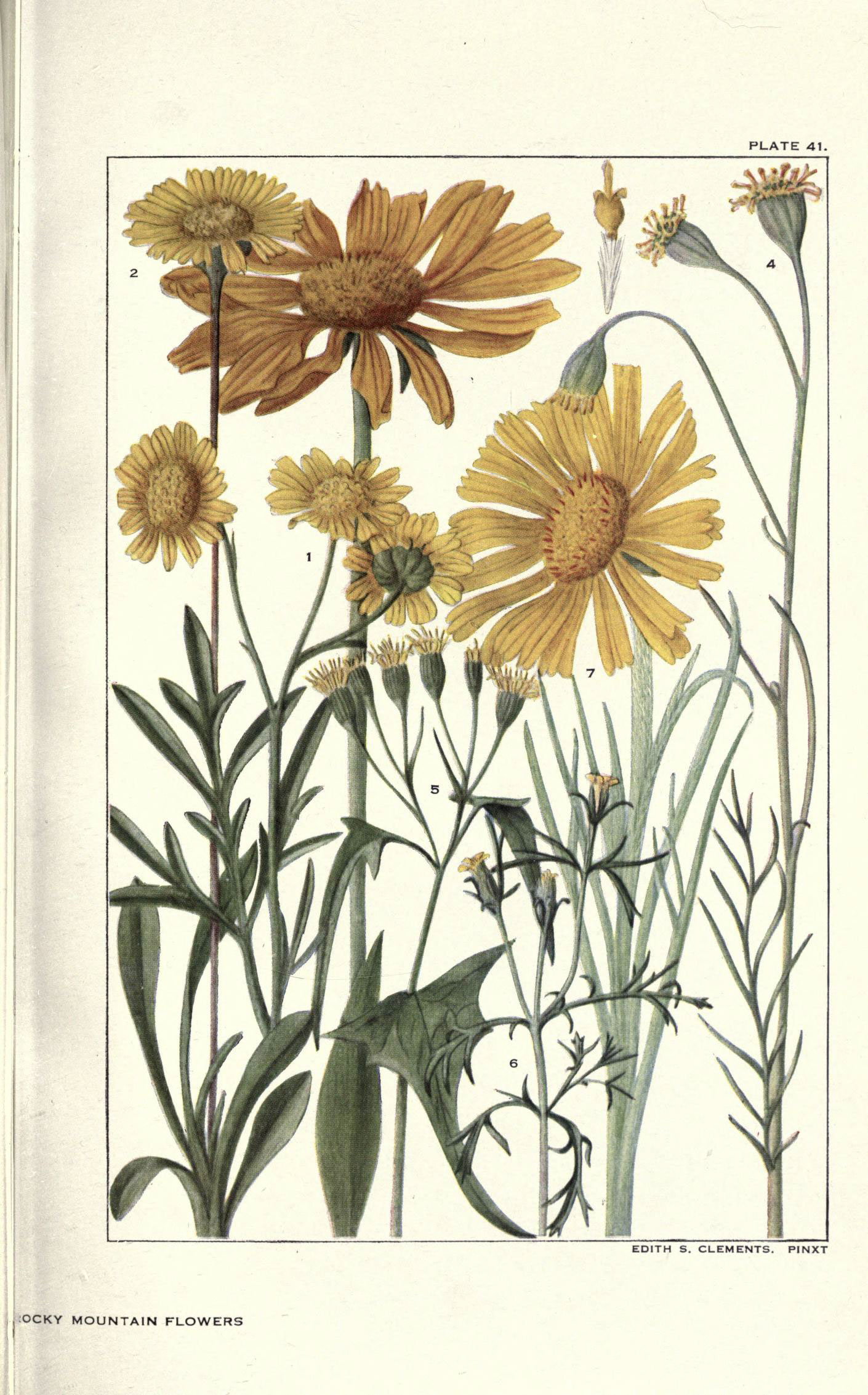
- Figure 4 - Hymenopappus tenuifolius

Conservation status
- Secure (NatureServe)

Scientific classification
- Kingdom: Plantae
- Clade: Tracheophytes
- Clade: Angiosperms
- Clade: Eudicots
- Clade: Asterids
- Order: Asterales
- Family: Asteraceae
- Genus: Hymenopappus
- Species: H. tenuifolius

Binomial name
- Hymenopappus tenuifolius Pursh 1813 not Nutt. ex Torr. & A.Gray 1842 nor Dougl. ex Hook. 1833

= Hymenopappus tenuifolius =

Species of flowering plant

Hymenopappus tenuifolius, the Chalk Hill hymenopappus, is a North American species of flowering plant in the daisy family. It grows in the central and southeastern United States, primarily on the Great Plains from Texas and New Mexico north as far as South Dakota.

Hymenopappus tenuifolius is a biennial herb up to 150 cm (5 feet) tall. It produces 20-200 flower heads per stem, each head with 25–50 white disc flowers but no ray flowers.
