= Halone diffusifascia =

Scientific classification
- Domain: Eukaryota
- Kingdom: Animalia
- Phylum: Arthropoda
- Class: Insecta
- Order: Lepidoptera
- Superfamily: Noctuoidea
- Family: Erebidae
- Subfamily: Arctiinae
- Genus: Halone
- Species: H. diffusifascia

Binomial name
- Halone diffusifascia (Swinhoe, 1896)

Synonyms
- Aemene diffusifascia Swinhoe, 1896

Species of moth

Halone diffusifascia is a moth of the subfamily Arctiinae. It was described by Charles Swinhoe in 1896. It is known from Assam, India.
