= Halone ophiodes =

Scientific classification
- Kingdom: Animalia
- Phylum: Arthropoda
- Class: Insecta
- Order: Lepidoptera
- Superfamily: Noctuoidea
- Family: Erebidae
- Subfamily: Arctiinae
- Genus: Halone
- Species: H. ophiodes

Binomial name
- Halone ophiodes (Meyrick, 1886)

Synonyms
- Mosoda ophiodes Meyrick, 1886

Species of moth

Halone ophiodes, the cryptic halone, is a moth of the subfamily Arctiinae. It was described by Edward Meyrick in 1886. It is found in Australia.
