= Halone flavescens =

Scientific classification
- Kingdom: Animalia
- Phylum: Arthropoda
- Class: Insecta
- Order: Lepidoptera
- Superfamily: Noctuoidea
- Family: Erebidae
- Subfamily: Arctiinae
- Genus: Halone
- Species: H. flavescens

Binomial name
- Halone flavescens (Hampson, 1898)

Synonyms
- Aemene flavescens Hampson, 1898

Species of moth

Halone flavescens is a moth of the subfamily Arctiinae. It was described by George Hampson in 1898. It is known from Assam, India.
