= Hygrophorus flavescens =

Scientific classification
- Kingdom: Fungi
- Division: Basidiomycota
- Class: Agaricomycetes
- Order: Agaricales
- Family: Hygrophoraceae
- Genus: Hygrophorus
- Species: H. flavescens

Binomial name
- Hygrophorus flavescens (Charles Kauffman) (1906)

Species of mushroom

Hygrophorus flavescens
- Mycological characteristics
- Gills on hymenium
- Cap is convex
- Hymenium is adnexed
- Spore print is white
- Edibility is edible

Hygrophorus flavescens is an edible mushroom of the genus Hygrophorus found in the Pacific Northwest, eastern North America, and Texas. It is similar to Hygrophorus chlorophanus, which has a sticky coating.

The fruiting body reaches up to 7.5 centimetres (3 in) wide and 9 cm (3.5 in) tall.
