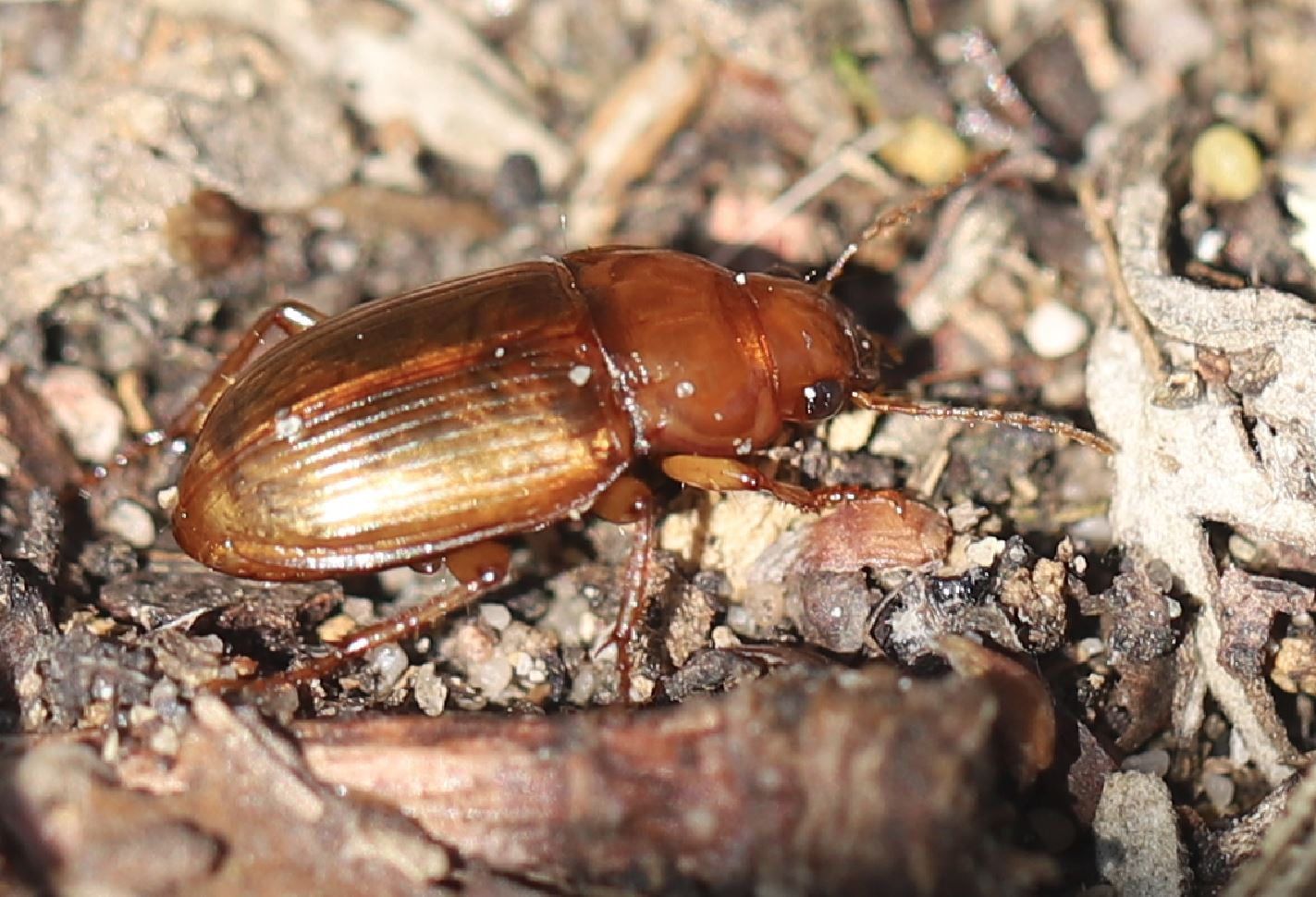

Scientific classification
- Kingdom: Animalia
- Phylum: Arthropoda
- Class: Insecta
- Order: Coleoptera
- Suborder: Adephaga
- Family: Carabidae
- Genus: Harpalus
- Species: H. flavescens

Binomial name
- Harpalus flavescens (Piller & Mitterpacher, 1783)

Synonyms
- Harpalus fabricii Crotch, 1871; Harpalus rufus Bruggemann, 1873

= Harpalus flavescens =

Species of beetle

Harpalus flavescens is a ground beetle in the Harpalinae subfamily that is common in Europe, Siberia, Central Asia and Northern Asia. In Central Asia it can be found only in Kazakhstan.
