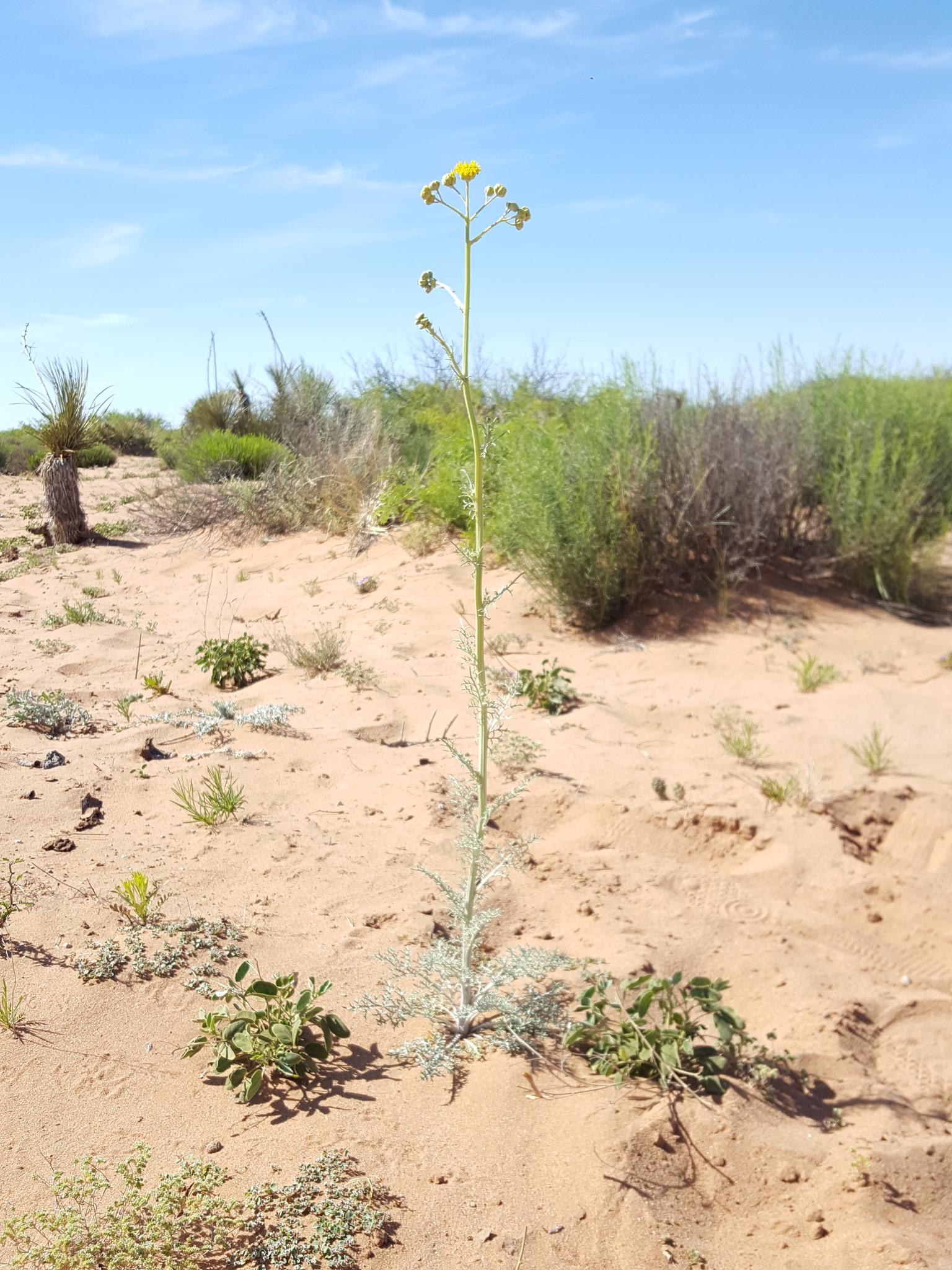

Conservation status
- Apparently Secure (NatureServe)

Scientific classification
- Kingdom: Plantae
- Clade: Tracheophytes
- Clade: Angiosperms
- Clade: Eudicots
- Clade: Asterids
- Order: Asterales
- Family: Asteraceae
- Genus: Hymenopappus
- Species: H. flavescens

Binomial name
- Hymenopappus flavescens A.Gray 1849

Synonyms
- Rothia flavescens (A.Gray) Kuntze; Hymenopappus robustus Greene

= Hymenopappus flavescens =

Species of flowering plant

Hymenopappus flavescens, the collegeflower, is a North American species of flowering plant in the daisy family.

== Distribution and habitat ==
It grows in the southwestern and south-central United States (Kansas, Oklahoma, Texas, Colorado, New Mexico, Arizona) and northern Mexico (Chihuahua). It grows in sandy soils.

== Description ==
Hymenopappus flavescens is a biennial herb up to 90 cm (3 feet) tall. It produces 15-100 flower heads per stem, each head with 20–40 yellow disc flowers but no ray flowers.

=== Varieties ===
Named varieties include:

- Hymenopappus flavescens var. canotomentosus A.Gray New Mexico, Texas, Chihuahua
- Hymenopappus flavescens var. flavescens - Colorado, Kansas, New Mexico, Oklahoma, Texas
