= Zygaenosia flavonigra =

Scientific classification
- Domain: Eukaryota
- Kingdom: Animalia
- Phylum: Arthropoda
- Class: Insecta
- Order: Lepidoptera
- Superfamily: Noctuoidea
- Family: Erebidae
- Subfamily: Arctiinae
- Genus: Zygaenosia
- Species: Z. flavonigra

Binomial name
- Zygaenosia flavonigra van Eecke, 1924

Species of moth

Zygaenosia flavonigra is a moth in the family Erebidae. It was described by van Eecke in 1924. It is found in Papua New Guinea.
