= Heliosia punctinigra =

Scientific classification
- Domain: Eukaryota
- Kingdom: Animalia
- Phylum: Arthropoda
- Class: Insecta
- Order: Lepidoptera
- Superfamily: Noctuoidea
- Family: Erebidae
- Subfamily: Arctiinae
- Genus: Heliosia
- Species: H. punctinigra

Binomial name
- Heliosia punctinigra Eecke, 1920

Species of moth

Heliosia punctinigra is a moth of the family Erebidae. It was described by Rudolf van Eecke in 1920. It is found on Java in Indonesia.
