= Neoscaptia torquata =

Scientific classification
- Kingdom: Animalia
- Phylum: Arthropoda
- Class: Insecta
- Order: Lepidoptera
- Superfamily: Noctuoidea
- Family: Erebidae
- Subfamily: Arctiinae
- Genus: Neoscaptia
- Species: N. torquata

Binomial name
- Neoscaptia torquata Eecke, 1929

Species of moth

Neoscaptia torquata is a moth of the subfamily Arctiinae. It was described by Rudolf van Eecke in 1929. It is found on Buru in Indonesia.
