= Sylescaptia tigrina =

Scientific classification
- Domain: Eukaryota
- Kingdom: Animalia
- Phylum: Arthropoda
- Class: Insecta
- Order: Lepidoptera
- Superfamily: Noctuoidea
- Family: Erebidae
- Subfamily: Arctiinae
- Genus: Sylescaptia
- Species: S. tigrina

Binomial name
- Sylescaptia tigrina van Eecke, 1920

Species of moth

Sylescaptia tigrina is a moth in the subfamily Arctiinae. It was described by Rudolf van Eecke in 1920. It is found on Java.
