= Neoscaptia flavicaput =

Scientific classification
- Kingdom: Animalia
- Phylum: Arthropoda
- Class: Insecta
- Order: Lepidoptera
- Superfamily: Noctuoidea
- Family: Erebidae
- Subfamily: Arctiinae
- Genus: Neoscaptia
- Species: N. flavicaput

Binomial name
- Neoscaptia flavicaput Rothschild, 1912

Species of moth

Neoscaptia flavicaput is a moth of the subfamily Arctiinae. It was described by Rothschild in 1912. It is found in New Guinea.
