= Heliosia monosticta =

Scientific classification
- Kingdom: Animalia
- Phylum: Arthropoda
- Class: Insecta
- Order: Lepidoptera
- Superfamily: Noctuoidea
- Family: Erebidae
- Subfamily: Arctiinae
- Genus: Heliosia
- Species: H. monosticta

Binomial name
- Heliosia monosticta Hampson, 1900

Species of moth

Heliosia monosticta is a moth of the family Erebidae. It was described by George Hampson in 1900. It is found on Borneo. The habitat consists of lowland forests, dry heath forests and coastal scrubs.
