= Neoscaptia fascionitens =

Scientific classification
- Kingdom: Animalia
- Phylum: Arthropoda
- Class: Insecta
- Order: Lepidoptera
- Superfamily: Noctuoidea
- Family: Erebidae
- Subfamily: Arctiinae
- Genus: Neoscaptia
- Species: N. fascionitens

Binomial name
- Neoscaptia fascionitens Rothschild, 1912

Synonyms
- Neoscaptia affinis Rothschild, 1912

Species of moth

Neoscaptia fascionitens is a moth of the subfamily Arctiinae. It was described by Rothschild in 1912. It is found in New Guinea.
