= Zygaenosia immaculata =

Scientific classification
- Domain: Eukaryota
- Kingdom: Animalia
- Phylum: Arthropoda
- Class: Insecta
- Order: Lepidoptera
- Superfamily: Noctuoidea
- Family: Erebidae
- Subfamily: Arctiinae
- Genus: Zygaenosia
- Species: Z. immaculata

Binomial name
- Zygaenosia immaculata (Rothschild & Jordan, 1901)

Synonyms
- Zygaenopsis immaculata Rothschild & Jordan, 1901

Species of moth

Zygaenosia immaculata is a moth in the subfamily Arctiinae. It was described by Rothschild and Jordan in 1901. It is found in Papua New Guinea.
