= Heliosia atriplaga =

Scientific classification
- Kingdom: Animalia
- Phylum: Arthropoda
- Class: Insecta
- Order: Lepidoptera
- Superfamily: Noctuoidea
- Family: Erebidae
- Subfamily: Arctiinae
- Genus: Heliosia
- Species: H. atriplaga

Binomial name
- Heliosia atriplaga Hampson, 1914

Species of moth

Heliosia atriplaga is a moth of the family Erebidae. It was described by George Hampson in 1914. It is found on the Loyalty Islands in the south-west Pacific.
