= Sylescaptia ambarawae =

Scientific classification
- Domain: Eukaryota
- Kingdom: Animalia
- Phylum: Arthropoda
- Class: Insecta
- Order: Lepidoptera
- Superfamily: Noctuoidea
- Family: Erebidae
- Subfamily: Arctiinae
- Genus: Sylescaptia
- Species: S. ambarawae

Binomial name
- Sylescaptia ambarawae van Eecke, 1920

Species of moth

Sylescaptia ambarawae is a moth in the subfamily Arctiinae. It was described by van Eecke in 1920. It is found on Java.
