= Heliosia perichares =

Scientific classification
- Domain: Eukaryota
- Kingdom: Animalia
- Phylum: Arthropoda
- Class: Insecta
- Order: Lepidoptera
- Superfamily: Noctuoidea
- Family: Erebidae
- Subfamily: Arctiinae
- Genus: Heliosia
- Species: H. perichares

Binomial name
- Heliosia perichares Turner, 1944

Species of moth

Heliosia perichares is a moth of the family Erebidae. It was described by Alfred Jefferis Turner in 1944. It is found in Australia, where it has been recorded from Queensland and New South Wales.
