= Zygaenosia medialis =

Scientific classification
- Domain: Eukaryota
- Kingdom: Animalia
- Phylum: Arthropoda
- Class: Insecta
- Order: Lepidoptera
- Superfamily: Noctuoidea
- Family: Erebidae
- Subfamily: Arctiinae
- Genus: Zygaenosia
- Species: Z. medialis

Binomial name
- Zygaenosia medialis Gaede, 1925

Species of moth

Zygaenosia medialis is a moth in the subfamily Arctiinae. It was described by Max Gaede in 1925. It is found on New Guinea.
