= Zygaenosia klossi =

Scientific classification
- Domain: Eukaryota
- Kingdom: Animalia
- Phylum: Arthropoda
- Class: Insecta
- Order: Lepidoptera
- Superfamily: Noctuoidea
- Family: Erebidae
- Subfamily: Arctiinae
- Genus: Zygaenosia
- Species: Z. klossi

Binomial name
- Zygaenosia klossi Rothschild, 1915

Species of moth

Zygaenosia klossi is a moth in the family Erebidae. It was described by Walter Rothschild in 1915. It is found in Papua New Guinea.
