= Neoscaptia =

Scientific classification
- Kingdom: Animalia
- Phylum: Arthropoda
- Class: Insecta
- Order: Lepidoptera
- Superfamily: Noctuoidea
- Family: Erebidae
- Subfamily: Arctiinae
- Tribe: Lithosiini
- Subtribe: Cisthenina
- Genus: Neoscaptia; Hampson, 1900

Genus of moths

Neoscaptia is a genus of moths in the family Erebidae. The genus was erected by George Hampson in 1900.

== Species ==
- Neoscaptia aequalis Jordan, 1905
- Neoscaptia albicollis Rothschild, 1912
- Neoscaptia angustifasciata Gaede, 1926
- Neoscaptia apicipuncta Rothschild, 1912
- Neoscaptia basinitens Rothschild, 1912
- Neoscaptia collateralis Hampson, 1900
- Neoscaptia eurochrysa (Hampson, 1914)
- Neoscaptia fascionitens Rothschild, 1912
- Neoscaptia flavicaput Rothschild, 1912
- Neoscaptia leucodera Jordan, 1905
- Neoscaptia poecila Jordan, 1905
- Neoscaptia torquata Eecke, 1929
- Neoscaptia unipunctata Rothschild, 1912
