= Heliosia aurantia =

Scientific classification
- Domain: Eukaryota
- Kingdom: Animalia
- Phylum: Arthropoda
- Class: Insecta
- Order: Lepidoptera
- Superfamily: Noctuoidea
- Family: Erebidae
- Subfamily: Arctiinae
- Genus: Heliosia
- Species: H. aurantia

Binomial name
- Heliosia aurantia (Rothschild, 1912)

Synonyms
- Rhagophanes aurantia Rothschild, 1912

Species of moth

Heliosia aurantia is a moth of the family Erebidae. It was described by Rothschild in 1912. It is found in New Guinea.
