= Heliosia =

Scientific classification
- Kingdom: Animalia
- Phylum: Arthropoda
- Class: Insecta
- Order: Lepidoptera
- Superfamily: Noctuoidea
- Family: Erebidae
- Subfamily: Arctiinae
- Tribe: Lithosiini
- Subtribe: Nudariina
- Genus: Heliosia; Hampson, 1900

Genus of moths

Heliosia is a genus of moths in the family Erebidae erected by George Hampson in 1900.

== Species ==
- Heliosia alba Hampson, 1914
- Heliosia atriplaga Hampson, 1914
- Heliosia aurantia Rothschild, 1912
- Heliosia charopa Turner, 1904
- Heliosia crocopera Hampson, 1900
- Heliosia jucunda Walker, 1854
- Heliosia micra Hampson, 1903
- Heliosia monosticta Hampson, 1900
- Heliosia novirufa C.-L. Fang, 1992
- Heliosia perichares Turner, 1944
- Heliosia punctata C.-L. Fang, 1992
- Heliosia punctinigra Eecke, 1920
- Heliosia rufa Leech, 1890
- Heliosia suffusus Rothschild, 1913

== Status unclear ==
- Heliosia flava Bang-Haas, 1927
