= Heliosia alba =

Scientific classification
- Kingdom: Animalia
- Phylum: Arthropoda
- Class: Insecta
- Order: Lepidoptera
- Superfamily: Noctuoidea
- Family: Erebidae
- Subfamily: Arctiinae
- Genus: Heliosia
- Species: H. alba

Binomial name
- Heliosia alba Hampson, 1914

Species of moth

Heliosia alba is a moth of the family Erebidae. It was described by George Hampson in 1914. It is found in Taiwan.
