= Neoscaptia leucodera =

Scientific classification
- Kingdom: Animalia
- Phylum: Arthropoda
- Class: Insecta
- Order: Lepidoptera
- Superfamily: Noctuoidea
- Family: Erebidae
- Subfamily: Arctiinae
- Genus: Neoscaptia
- Species: N. leucodera

Binomial name
- Neoscaptia leucodera Jordan, 1905

Species of moth

Neoscaptia leucodera is a moth of the subfamily Arctiinae. It was described by Karl Jordan in 1905. It is found on New Guinea.
