= Zygaenosia =

Scientific classification
- Kingdom: Animalia
- Phylum: Arthropoda
- Class: Insecta
- Order: Lepidoptera
- Superfamily: Noctuoidea
- Family: Erebidae
- Subfamily: Arctiinae
- Tribe: Lithosiini
- Genus: Zygaenosia; Hampson, 1900

Synonyms
- Zygaenopsis C. Swinhoe, 1892 (preocc. Felder, 1874)

Genus of moths

Zygaenosia is a genus of moths in the family Erebidae. The genus was erected by George Hampson in 1900.

== Species ==
- Zygaenosia basalis (Rothschild & Jordan, 1901)
- Zygaenosia eximia Rothschild, 1936
- Zygaenosia flavibasis (C. Swinhoe, 1892)
- Zygaenosia flavonigra van Eecke, 1924
- Zygaenosia fumosa (Rothschild, 1901)
- Zygaenosia fuliginosa Rothschild, 1913
- Zygaenosia fuscimarginalis (C. Swinhoe, 1892)
- Zygaenosia immaculata (Rothschild & Jordan, 1901)
- Zygaenosia klossi Rothschild, 1915
- Zygaenosia medialis Gaede, 1925
- Zygaenosia subhyalinifascia Rothschild, 1913

== Former species ==
- Zygaenosia melanoxantha (Hampson, 1914)
- Zygaenosia truncata Rothschild, 1913
