= Zygaenosia basalis =

Scientific classification
- Domain: Eukaryota
- Kingdom: Animalia
- Phylum: Arthropoda
- Class: Insecta
- Order: Lepidoptera
- Superfamily: Noctuoidea
- Family: Erebidae
- Subfamily: Arctiinae
- Genus: Zygaenosia
- Species: Z. basalis

Binomial name
- Zygaenosia basalis (Rothschild & Jordan, 1901)

Synonyms
- Zygaenopsis basalis Rothschild & Jordan, 1901; Zygaenopsis assimilis Rothschild & Jordan, 1901; Zygaenosia basalis ab. milnensis Strand, 1922

Species of moth

Zygaenosia basalis is a moth in the family Erebidae. It was described by Rothschild and Jordan in 1901, and is endemic to Papua New Guinea.
