= Heliosia charopa =

Scientific classification
- Domain: Eukaryota
- Kingdom: Animalia
- Phylum: Arthropoda
- Class: Insecta
- Order: Lepidoptera
- Superfamily: Noctuoidea
- Family: Erebidae
- Subfamily: Arctiinae
- Genus: Heliosia
- Species: H. charopa

Binomial name
- Heliosia charopa Turner, 1904

Species of moth

Heliosia charopa is a moth of the family Erebidae. It was described by Alfred Jefferis Turner in 1904. It is found in Australia, where it has been recorded from Queensland.
