= Neoscaptia collateralis =

Scientific classification
- Kingdom: Animalia
- Phylum: Arthropoda
- Class: Insecta
- Order: Lepidoptera
- Superfamily: Noctuoidea
- Family: Erebidae
- Subfamily: Arctiinae
- Genus: Neoscaptia
- Species: N. collateralis

Binomial name
- Neoscaptia collateralis Hampson, 1900

Synonyms
- Neoscaptia collaris Hampson, 1922

Species of moth

Neoscaptia collateralis is a moth of the subfamily Arctiinae. It was described by George Hampson in 1900. It is found on New Guinea.
