= Zygaenosia fuliginosa =

Scientific classification
- Domain: Eukaryota
- Kingdom: Animalia
- Phylum: Arthropoda
- Class: Insecta
- Order: Lepidoptera
- Superfamily: Noctuoidea
- Family: Erebidae
- Subfamily: Arctiinae
- Genus: Zygaenosia
- Species: Z. fuliginosa

Binomial name
- Zygaenosia fuliginosa Rothschild, 1913

Species of moth

Zygaenosia fuliginosa is a moth in the family Erebidae. It was described by Walter Rothschild in 1913. It is found in Papua New Guinea.
