= Neoscaptia albicollis =

Scientific classification
- Kingdom: Animalia
- Phylum: Arthropoda
- Class: Insecta
- Order: Lepidoptera
- Superfamily: Noctuoidea
- Family: Erebidae
- Subfamily: Arctiinae
- Genus: Neoscaptia
- Species: N. albicollis

Binomial name
- Neoscaptia albicollis Rothschild, 1912

Synonyms
- Caprimima reducta Rothschild, 1936

Species of moth

Neoscaptia albicollis is a moth of the family Erebidae. It was described by Walter Rothschild in 1912. It is found in Papua New Guinea.

== Subspecies ==
- Neoscaptia albicollis albicollis
- Neoscaptia albicollis reducta (Rothschild, 1936) (New Ireland)
