= Heliosia punctata =

Scientific classification
- Kingdom: Animalia
- Phylum: Arthropoda
- Clade: Pancrustacea
- Class: Insecta
- Order: Lepidoptera
- Superfamily: Noctuoidea
- Family: Erebidae
- Subfamily: Arctiinae
- Genus: Heliosia
- Species: H. punctata

Binomial name
- Heliosia punctata C.-L. Fang, 1992

Species of moth

Heliosia punctata is a moth of the subfamily Arctiinae. It was described by Cheng-Lai Fang in 1992. It is found in Sichuan, China.
