= Zygaenosia fumosa =

Scientific classification
- Domain: Eukaryota
- Kingdom: Animalia
- Phylum: Arthropoda
- Class: Insecta
- Order: Lepidoptera
- Superfamily: Noctuoidea
- Family: Erebidae
- Subfamily: Arctiinae
- Genus: Zygaenosia
- Species: Z. fumosa

Binomial name
- Zygaenosia fumosa (Rothschild, 1901)

Synonyms
- Zygaenopsis fumosa Rothschild, 1901; Zygaenopsis fumosa flaviventris Rothschild & Jordan, 1901

Species of moth

Zygaenosia fumosa is a moth in the family Erebidae. It was described by Walter Rothschild in 1901. It is found in Papua New Guinea.

== Subspecies ==
- Zygaenosia fumosa fumosa
- Zygaenosia fumosa flaviventris (Rothschild & Jordan, 1901)
