= Heliosia jucunda =

Scientific classification
- Kingdom: Animalia
- Phylum: Arthropoda
- Clade: Pancrustacea
- Class: Insecta
- Order: Lepidoptera
- Superfamily: Noctuoidea
- Family: Erebidae
- Subfamily: Arctiinae
- Genus: Heliosia
- Species: H. jucunda

Binomial name
- Heliosia jucunda (Walker, 1854)

Synonyms
- Pallene jucunda Walker, 1854; Tospitis transitana Walker, 1863

Species of moth

Heliosia jucunda is a moth of the family Erebidae. It was described by Francis Walker in 1854. It is found in the Australian states of Queensland and New South Wales.
