= Heliosia suffusus =

Scientific classification
- Domain: Eukaryota
- Kingdom: Animalia
- Phylum: Arthropoda
- Class: Insecta
- Order: Lepidoptera
- Superfamily: Noctuoidea
- Family: Erebidae
- Subfamily: Arctiinae
- Genus: Heliosia
- Species: H. suffusus

Binomial name
- Heliosia suffusus (Rothschild, 1913)

Synonyms
- Palaeopsis suffusus Rothschild, 1913

Species of moth

Heliosia suffusus is a moth of the family Erebidae. It was described by Rothschild in 1913. It is found in New Guinea.
