= Neoscaptia unipunctata =

Scientific classification
- Kingdom: Animalia
- Phylum: Arthropoda
- Class: Insecta
- Order: Lepidoptera
- Superfamily: Noctuoidea
- Family: Erebidae
- Subfamily: Arctiinae
- Genus: Neoscaptia
- Species: N. unipunctata

Binomial name
- Neoscaptia unipunctata (Rothschild, 1912)

Synonyms
- Caprimima unipunctata Rothschild, 1912

Species of moth

Neoscaptia unipunctata is a moth of the subfamily Arctiinae. It was described by Rothschild in 1912. It is found in New Guinea.
