= Neoscaptia angustifasciata =

Scientific classification
- Kingdom: Animalia
- Phylum: Arthropoda
- Class: Insecta
- Order: Lepidoptera
- Superfamily: Noctuoidea
- Family: Erebidae
- Subfamily: Arctiinae
- Genus: Neoscaptia
- Species: N. angustifasciata

Binomial name
- Neoscaptia angustifasciata Gaede, 1926

Species of moth

Neoscaptia angustifasciata is a moth of the family Erebidae. It was described by Max Gaede in 1926. It is found in New Guinea.
