= Sylescaptia =

Scientific classification
- Domain: Eukaryota
- Kingdom: Animalia
- Phylum: Arthropoda
- Class: Insecta
- Order: Lepidoptera
- Superfamily: Noctuoidea
- Family: Erebidae
- Subfamily: Arctiinae
- Tribe: Lithosiini
- Genus: Sylescaptia van Eecke, 1920

Genus of moths

Sylescaptia is a genus of moths in the subfamily Arctiinae.

== Species ==
- Sylescaptia ambarawae van Eecke, 1920
- Sylescaptia tigrina van Eecke, 1920
