= Zygaenosia eximia =

Scientific classification
- Domain: Eukaryota
- Kingdom: Animalia
- Phylum: Arthropoda
- Class: Insecta
- Order: Lepidoptera
- Superfamily: Noctuoidea
- Family: Erebidae
- Subfamily: Arctiinae
- Genus: Zygaenosia
- Species: Z. eximia

Binomial name
- Zygaenosia eximia Rothschild, 1936

Species of moth

Zygaenosia eximia is a moth in the subfamily Arctiinae. It was described by Rothschild in 1936. It is found in Papua New Guinea.
