= Heliosia rufa =

Scientific classification
- Domain: Eukaryota
- Kingdom: Animalia
- Phylum: Arthropoda
- Class: Insecta
- Order: Lepidoptera
- Superfamily: Noctuoidea
- Family: Erebidae
- Subfamily: Arctiinae
- Genus: Heliosia
- Species: H. rufa

Binomial name
- Heliosia rufa (Leech, 1890)

Synonyms
- Miltochrista rufa Leech, 1890; Miltochrista ussuriensis Bang-Haas, 1927; Paraheliosia rufa (Leech, 1890)

Species of moth

Heliosia rufa is a moth of the family Erebidae. It was described by John Henry Leech in 1890. It is found in the Russian Far East (Primorye) and China.

== Subspecies ==
- Heliosia rufa rufa
- Heliosia rufa ussuriensis Bang-Haas, 1927 (southern Primorye)
