= Zygaenosia flavibasis =

Scientific classification
- Domain: Eukaryota
- Kingdom: Animalia
- Phylum: Arthropoda
- Class: Insecta
- Order: Lepidoptera
- Superfamily: Noctuoidea
- Family: Erebidae
- Subfamily: Arctiinae
- Genus: Zygaenosia
- Species: Z. flavibasis

Binomial name
- Zygaenosia flavibasis (C. Swinhoe, 1892)

Synonyms
- Zygaenopsis flavibasis C. Swinhoe, 1892; Northia papua Oberthür, 1894

Species of moth

Zygaenosia flavibasis is a moth in the family Erebidae. It was described by Charles Swinhoe in 1892. It is found on New Guinea.
