= Zygaenosia fuscimarginalis =

Scientific classification
- Domain: Eukaryota
- Kingdom: Animalia
- Phylum: Arthropoda
- Class: Insecta
- Order: Lepidoptera
- Superfamily: Noctuoidea
- Family: Erebidae
- Subfamily: Arctiinae
- Genus: Zygaenosia
- Species: Z. fuscimarginalis

Binomial name
- Zygaenosia fuscimarginalis (C. Swinhoe, 1892)

Synonyms
- Zygaenopsis fuscimarginalis C. Swinhoe, 1892

Species of moth

Zygaenosia fuscimarginalis is a moth in the family Erebidae. It was described by Charles Swinhoe in 1892. It is found in Papua New Guinea.
