= Heliosia micra =

Scientific classification
- Domain: Eukaryota
- Kingdom: Animalia
- Phylum: Arthropoda
- Class: Insecta
- Order: Lepidoptera
- Superfamily: Noctuoidea
- Family: Erebidae
- Subfamily: Arctiinae
- Genus: Heliosia
- Species: H. micra

Binomial name
- Heliosia micra Hampson, 1903

Species of moth

Heliosia micra is a moth of the family Erebidae. It was described by George Hampson in 1903. It is found in Australia.
