= Neoscaptia eurochrysa =

Scientific classification
- Kingdom: Animalia
- Phylum: Arthropoda
- Class: Insecta
- Order: Lepidoptera
- Superfamily: Noctuoidea
- Family: Erebidae
- Subfamily: Arctiinae
- Genus: Neoscaptia
- Species: N. eurochrysa

Binomial name
- Neoscaptia eurochrysa (Hampson, 1914)

Synonyms
- Heliosia eurochrysa Hampson, 1914

Species of moth

Neoscaptia eurochrysa is a moth of the subfamily Arctiinae. It was described by George Hampson in 1914. It is found on New Guinea.
