= Rudolf van Eecke =

Dutch entomologist

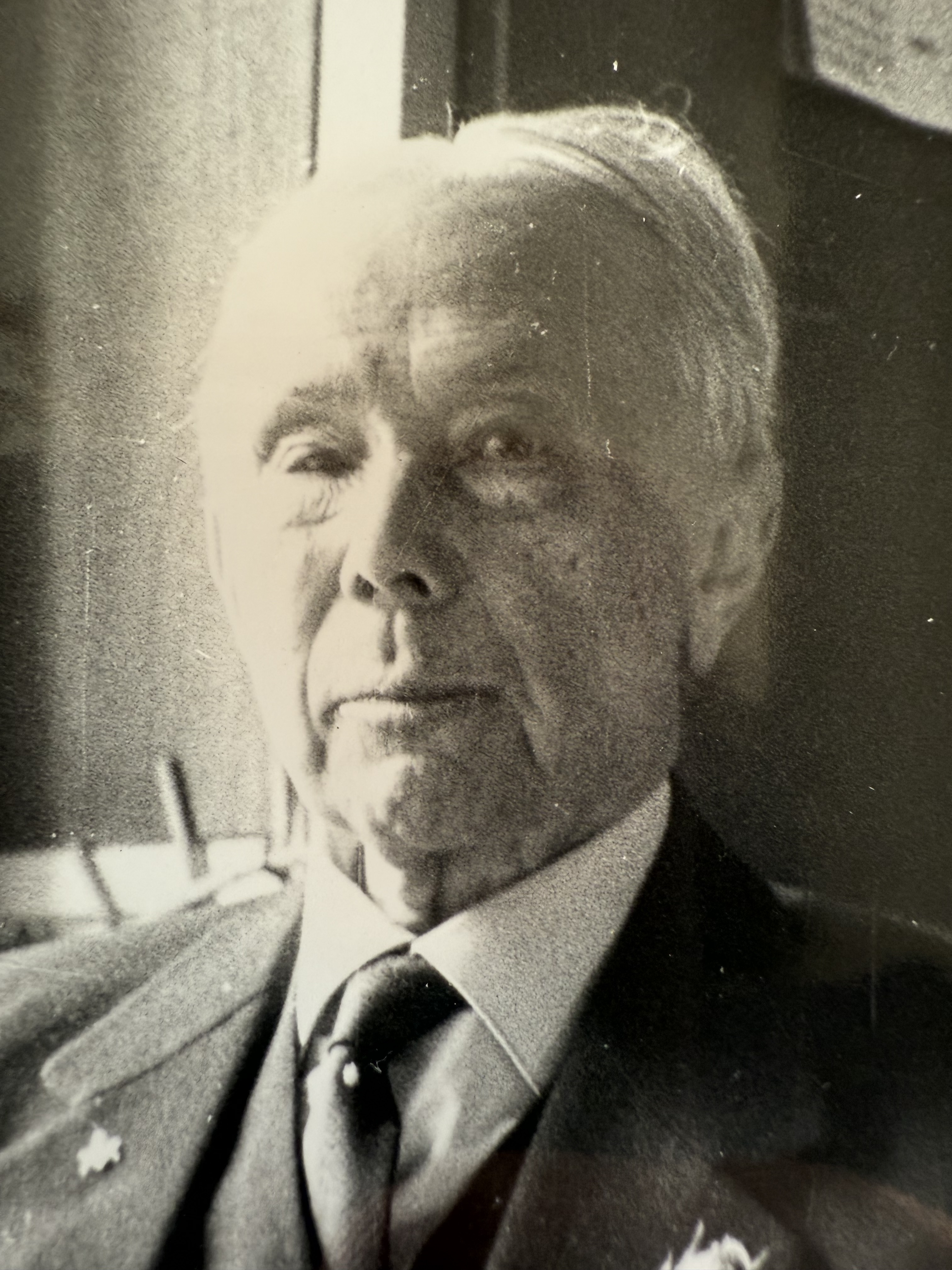
Rudolf van Eecke

Rudolf (or Rudolph) van Eecke (23 October 1886, Buitenzorg, Java – 24 December 1975, Leiden) was a Dutch entomologist.

He attended the gymnasium in Leiden. In 1912 he married Wilhelmina Henriëtte Petré then in 1927 Margaretha Emma Julia Hettyey. In 1916 (Leidsch Jaarboekje 1917) he became a conservator at the Rijksmuseum van Natuurlijke Historie now merged with Rijksmuseum van Geologie en Mineralogie as Naturalis, where he worked on Lepidoptera.

== Works ==
- selection of articles by R. van Eecke including De Heterocera van Sumatra I - VII and articles on Indo-Australian Lepidoptera, published by Leiden Museum
