= Stenoscaptia =

Scientific classification
- Kingdom: Animalia
- Phylum: Arthropoda
- Class: Insecta
- Order: Lepidoptera
- Superfamily: Noctuoidea
- Family: Erebidae
- Subfamily: Arctiinae
- Tribe: Lithosiini
- Genus: Stenoscaptia; Hampson, 1900

Genus of moths

Stenoscaptia is a genus of moths in the family Erebidae.

== Species ==
- Stenoscaptia aroa Bethune-Baker, 1904
- Stenoscaptia bipartita (Rothschild, 1913)
- Stenoscaptia dichromus Rothschild, 1916
- Stenoscaptia fovealis Hampson, 1903
- Stenoscaptia latifascia Rothschild, 1916
- Stenoscaptia niveiceps Rothschild, 1913
- Stenoscaptia venusta Lucas, 1890

== Former species ==
- Stenoscaptia phlogozona Turner, 1904
