= Stenoscaptia aroa =

Scientific classification
- Domain: Eukaryota
- Kingdom: Animalia
- Phylum: Arthropoda
- Class: Insecta
- Order: Lepidoptera
- Superfamily: Noctuoidea
- Family: Erebidae
- Subfamily: Arctiinae
- Genus: Stenoscaptia
- Species: S. aroa

Binomial name
- Stenoscaptia aroa (Bethune-Baker, 1904)

Synonyms
- Garudinistis aroa Bethune-Baker, 1904

Species of moth

Stenoscaptia aroa is a moth in the family Erebidae. It is found in New Guinea.
