= Heterallactis semiconstricta =

Scientific classification
- Kingdom: Animalia
- Phylum: Arthropoda
- Class: Insecta
- Order: Lepidoptera
- Superfamily: Noctuoidea
- Family: Erebidae
- Subfamily: Arctiinae
- Genus: Heterallactis
- Species: H. semiconstricta

Binomial name
- Heterallactis semiconstricta Hampson, 1914

Species of moth

Heterallactis semiconstricta is a moth of the family Erebidae. It was described by George Hampson in 1914. It is found on New Guinea.
