= Stenoscaptia niveiceps =

Scientific classification
- Domain: Eukaryota
- Kingdom: Animalia
- Phylum: Arthropoda
- Class: Insecta
- Order: Lepidoptera
- Superfamily: Noctuoidea
- Family: Erebidae
- Subfamily: Arctiinae
- Genus: Stenoscaptia
- Species: S. niveiceps

Binomial name
- Stenoscaptia niveiceps (Rothschild, 1913)

Synonyms
- Chrysallactis niveiceps Rothschild, 1913

Species of moth

Stenoscaptia niveiceps is a moth in the family Erebidae. It is found in New Guinea.
