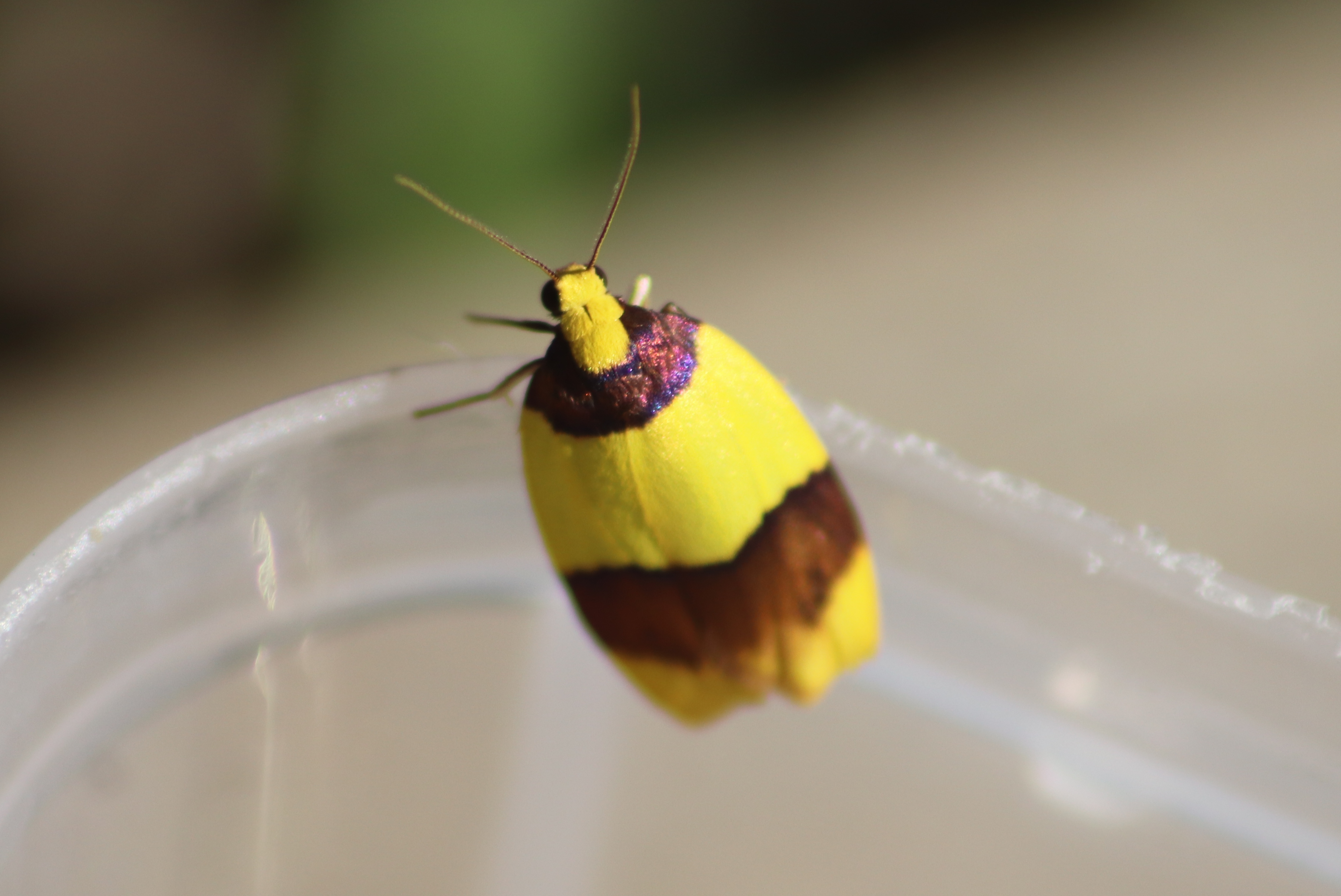

Scientific classification
- Kingdom: Animalia
- Phylum: Arthropoda
- Class: Insecta
- Order: Lepidoptera
- Superfamily: Noctuoidea
- Family: Erebidae
- Subfamily: Arctiinae
- Genus: Heterallactis
- Species: H. euchrysa

Binomial name
- Heterallactis euchrysa Meyrick, 1886

= Heterallactis euchrysa =

Species of moth

Heterallactis euchrysa is a moth of the family Erebidae, described by Edward Meyrick in 1886. It is found in the Australian states of Queensland and New South Wales. Its forewings are dark brown in color with two broad yellow bands. The larvae feed on lichen.
