= Stenoscaptia fovealis =

Scientific classification
- Kingdom: Animalia
- Phylum: Arthropoda
- Class: Insecta
- Order: Lepidoptera
- Superfamily: Noctuoidea
- Family: Erebidae
- Subfamily: Arctiinae
- Genus: Stenoscaptia
- Species: S. fovealis

Binomial name
- Stenoscaptia fovealis Hampson, 1903

Species of moth

Stenoscaptia fovealis is a moth in the subfamily Arctiinae first described by George Hampson in 1903. It is found in New Guinea.
