= Stenoscaptia bipartita =

Scientific classification
- Domain: Eukaryota
- Kingdom: Animalia
- Phylum: Arthropoda
- Class: Insecta
- Order: Lepidoptera
- Superfamily: Noctuoidea
- Family: Erebidae
- Subfamily: Arctiinae
- Genus: Stenoscaptia
- Species: S. bipartita

Binomial name
- Stenoscaptia bipartita (Rothschild, 1913)

Species of moth

Stenoscaptia bipartita is a moth in the subfamily Arctiinae first described by Rothschild in 1913. It is found in New Guinea.
