= Stenoscaptia venusta =

Scientific classification
- Domain: Eukaryota
- Kingdom: Animalia
- Phylum: Arthropoda
- Class: Insecta
- Order: Lepidoptera
- Superfamily: Noctuoidea
- Family: Erebidae
- Subfamily: Arctiinae
- Genus: Stenoscaptia
- Species: S. venusta

Binomial name
- Stenoscaptia venusta (T. P. Lucas, 1890)

Synonyms
- Mosoda venusta T. P. Lucas, 1890

Species of moth

Stenoscaptia venusta is a moth in the family Erebidae first described by Thomas Pennington Lucas in 1890. It is found in Australia, where it has been recorded from the Australian Capital Territory, New South Wales and Queensland.
