= Heterallactis microchrysa =

Scientific classification
- Domain: Eukaryota
- Kingdom: Animalia
- Phylum: Arthropoda
- Class: Insecta
- Order: Lepidoptera
- Superfamily: Noctuoidea
- Family: Erebidae
- Subfamily: Arctiinae
- Genus: Heterallactis
- Species: H. microchrysa

Binomial name
- Heterallactis microchrysa Turner, 1940

Species of moth

Heterallactis microchrysa is a moth of the family Erebidae. It was described by Alfred Jefferis Turner in 1940. It is found in Queensland, Australia.

The wingspan is about 10 mm. The forewings are yellow with two broad brown bands. The hindwings are brown.
