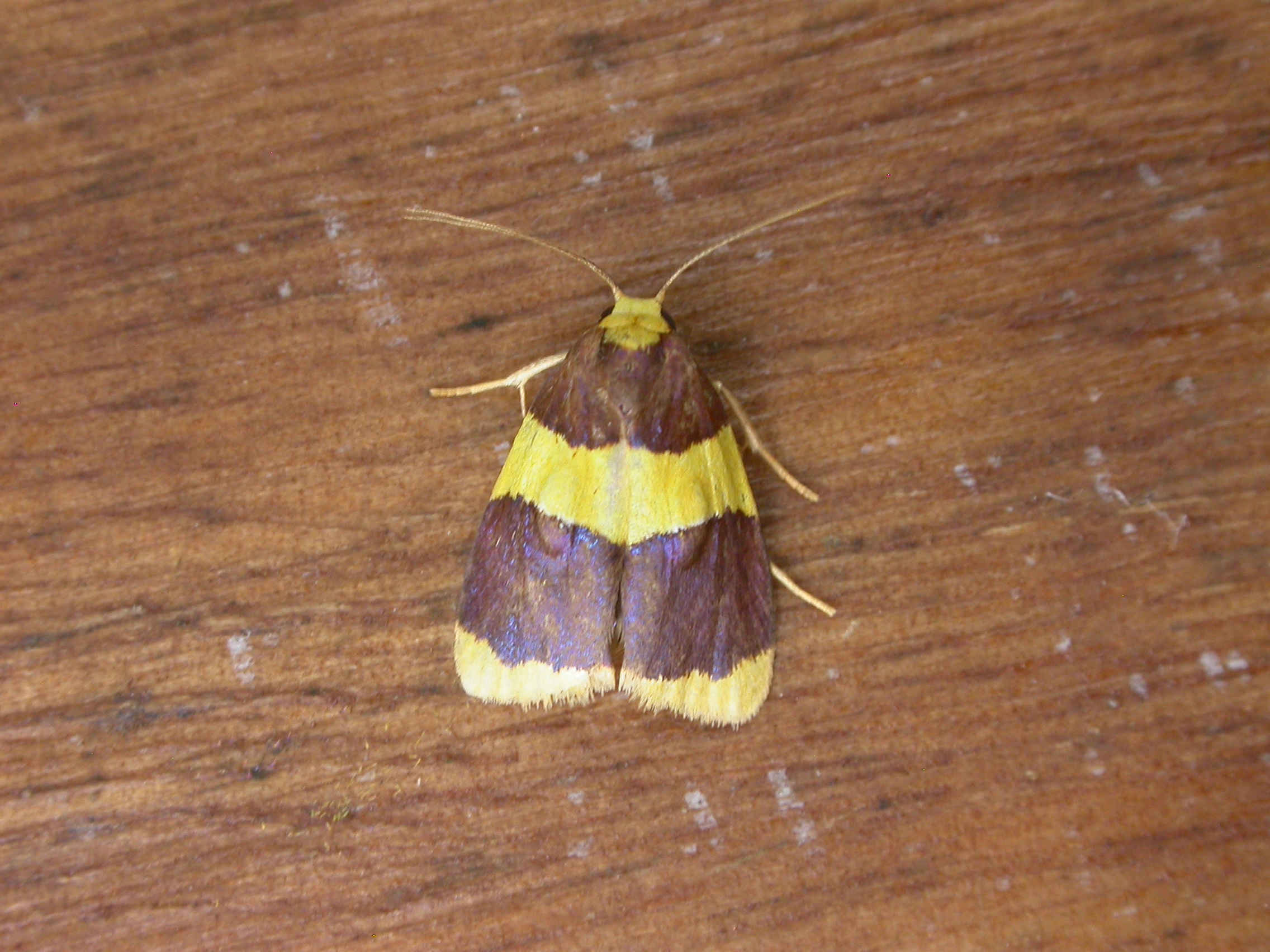
- Heterallactis phlogozona

Scientific classification
- Kingdom: Animalia
- Phylum: Arthropoda
- Class: Insecta
- Order: Lepidoptera
- Superfamily: Noctuoidea
- Family: Erebidae
- Subfamily: Arctiinae
- Subtribe: Nudariina
- Genus: Heterallactis; Meyrick, 1886

= Heterallactis =

Genus of moths

Heterallactis is a genus of moths in the family Erebidae erected by Edward Meyrick in 1886.

== Species ==
- Heterallactis aroa Bethune-Baker, 1904
- Heterallactis euchrysa Meyrick, 1886
- Heterallactis microchrysa Turner, 1940
- Heterallactis niphocephala Turner, 1940
- Heterallactis phlogozona (Turner, 1904)
- Heterallactis semiconstricta Hampson, 1914
- Heterallactis stenochrysa Turner, 1940
- Heterallactis trigonochrysa Turner, 1940
