= Stenoscaptia dichromus =

Scientific classification
- Domain: Eukaryota
- Kingdom: Animalia
- Phylum: Arthropoda
- Class: Insecta
- Order: Lepidoptera
- Superfamily: Noctuoidea
- Family: Erebidae
- Subfamily: Arctiinae
- Genus: Stenoscaptia
- Species: S. dichromus

Binomial name
- Stenoscaptia dichromus Rothschild, 1916

Species of moth

Stenoscaptia dichromus is a moth in the family Erebidae. It is found on the Dampier Archipelago.
