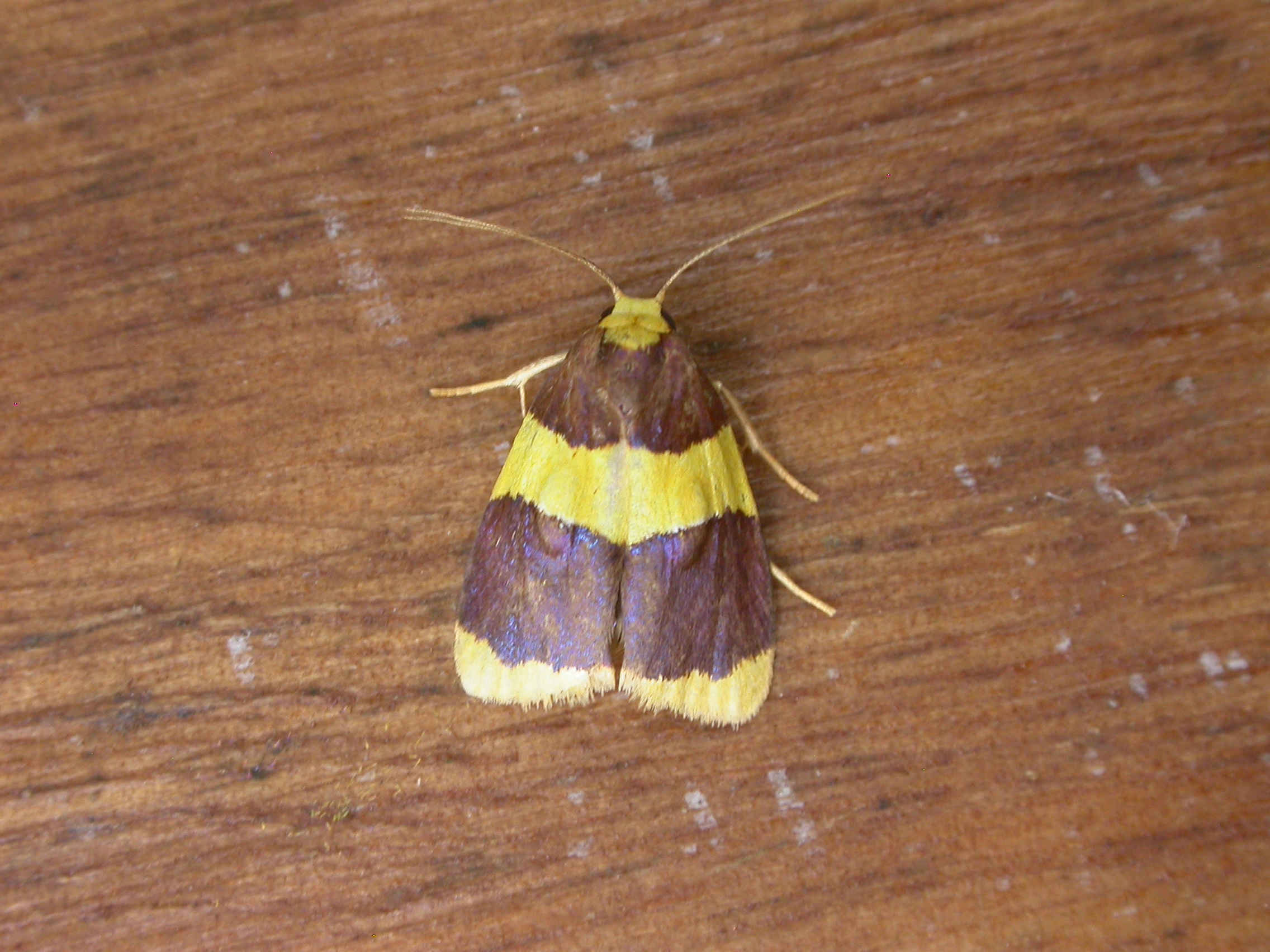

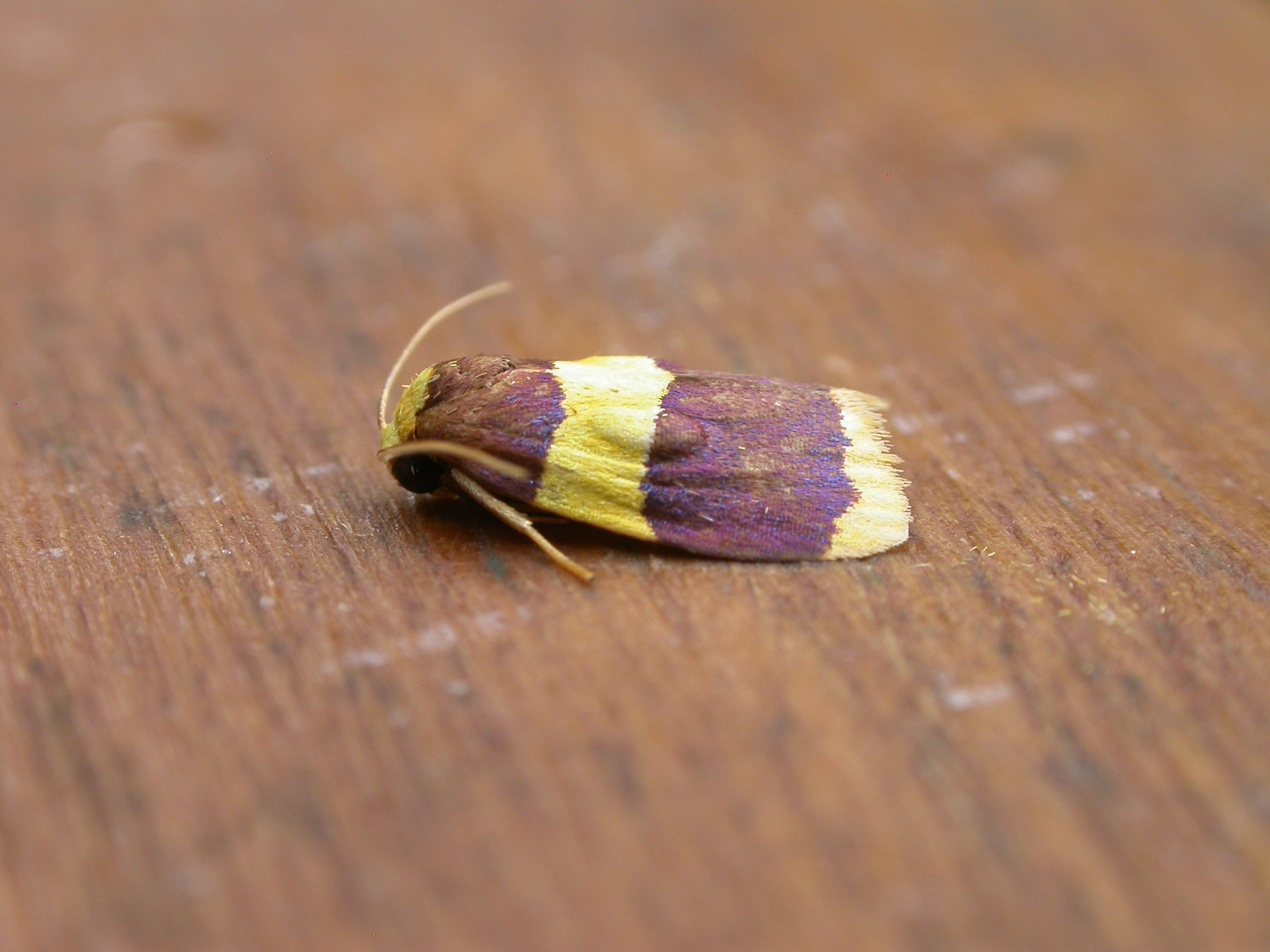

Scientific classification
- Domain: Eukaryota
- Kingdom: Animalia
- Phylum: Arthropoda
- Class: Insecta
- Order: Lepidoptera
- Superfamily: Noctuoidea
- Family: Erebidae
- Subfamily: Arctiinae
- Genus: Heterallactis
- Species: H. phlogozona

Binomial name
- Heterallactis phlogozona (Turner, 1904)

Synonyms
- Stenoscaptia phlogozona Turner, 1904; Heterallactis chrysauges Turner, 1940

= Heterallactis phlogozona =

Species of moth

Heterallactis phlogozona is a species of moth of the family Erebidae. It is found in Australia (the Northern Territory and Queensland) and Papua New Guinea.
