= Schistophleps costimacula =

Scientific classification
- Domain: Eukaryota
- Kingdom: Animalia
- Phylum: Arthropoda
- Class: Insecta
- Order: Lepidoptera
- Superfamily: Noctuoidea
- Family: Erebidae
- Subfamily: Arctiinae
- Genus: Schistophleps
- Species: S. costimacula

Binomial name
- Schistophleps costimacula Rothschild, 1913

Species of moth

Schistophleps costimacula is a moth in the subfamily Arctiinae. It was described by Rothschild in 1913. It is found in New Guinea.
