= Schistophleps simillima =

Scientific classification
- Domain: Eukaryota
- Kingdom: Animalia
- Phylum: Arthropoda
- Class: Insecta
- Order: Lepidoptera
- Superfamily: Noctuoidea
- Family: Erebidae
- Subfamily: Arctiinae
- Genus: Schistophleps
- Species: S. simillima

Binomial name
- Schistophleps simillima (Rothschild, 1913)

Synonyms
- Nudaria simillima Rothschild, 1913

Species of moth

Schistophleps simillima is a moth in the subfamily Arctiinae. It was described by Rothschild in 1913. It is found in New Guinea.
