= Schistophleps plagosus =

Scientific classification
- Domain: Eukaryota
- Kingdom: Animalia
- Phylum: Arthropoda
- Class: Insecta
- Order: Lepidoptera
- Superfamily: Noctuoidea
- Family: Erebidae
- Subfamily: Arctiinae
- Genus: Schistophleps
- Species: S. plagosus

Binomial name
- Schistophleps plagosus Rothschild, 1916

Species of moth

Schistophleps plagosus is a moth in the subfamily Arctiinae. It was described by Rothschild in 1916. It is found on the Dampier Archipelago.
