= Schistophleps obducta =

Scientific classification
- Domain: Eukaryota
- Kingdom: Animalia
- Phylum: Arthropoda
- Class: Insecta
- Order: Lepidoptera
- Superfamily: Noctuoidea
- Family: Erebidae
- Subfamily: Arctiinae
- Genus: Schistophleps
- Species: S. obducta

Binomial name
- Schistophleps obducta (T. P. Lucas, 1894)

Synonyms
- Nudaria obducta T. P. Lucas, 1894; Philenora thelxinoa Turner, 1940; Philnora thelxinoa

Species of moth

Schistophleps obducta is a moth in the subfamily Arctiinae. It was described by Thomas Pennington Lucas in 1894. It is found in the Australian states of Queensland and New South Wales.

Adults are blotchy pale brown with several dark spots along the costa of the forewings.
