= Schistophleps minor =

Scientific classification
- Domain: Eukaryota
- Kingdom: Animalia
- Phylum: Arthropoda
- Class: Insecta
- Order: Lepidoptera
- Superfamily: Noctuoidea
- Family: Erebidae
- Subfamily: Arctiinae
- Genus: Schistophleps
- Species: S. minor

Binomial name
- Schistophleps minor Roepke, 1946

Species of moth

Schistophleps minor is a moth in the subfamily Arctiinae. It was described by Roepke in 1946. It is found on Sulawesi.
