= Schistophleps lofaushanensis =

Scientific classification
- Domain: Eukaryota
- Kingdom: Animalia
- Phylum: Arthropoda
- Class: Insecta
- Order: Lepidoptera
- Superfamily: Noctuoidea
- Family: Erebidae
- Subfamily: Arctiinae
- Genus: Schistophleps
- Species: S. lofaushanensis

Binomial name
- Schistophleps lofaushanensis Daniel, 1951

Species of moth

Schistophleps lofaushanensis is a moth in the subfamily Arctiinae. It was described by Franz Daniel in 1951. It is found in southern China.
