= Schistophleps bicolora =

Scientific classification
- Domain: Eukaryota
- Kingdom: Animalia
- Phylum: Arthropoda
- Class: Insecta
- Order: Lepidoptera
- Superfamily: Noctuoidea
- Family: Erebidae
- Subfamily: Arctiinae
- Genus: Schistophleps
- Species: S. bicolora

Binomial name
- Schistophleps bicolora Bethune-Baker, 1904

Species of moth

Schistophleps bicolora is a moth in the family Erebidae. It was described by George Thomas Bethune-Baker in 1904. It is found in New Guinea.
