= Schistophleps hyalina =

Scientific classification
- Domain: Eukaryota
- Kingdom: Animalia
- Phylum: Arthropoda
- Class: Insecta
- Order: Lepidoptera
- Superfamily: Noctuoidea
- Family: Erebidae
- Subfamily: Arctiinae
- Genus: Schistophleps
- Species: S. hyalina

Binomial name
- Schistophleps hyalina Bethune-Baker, 1908

Species of moth

Schistophleps hyalina is a moth in the subfamily Arctiinae. It was described by George Thomas Bethune-Baker in 1908. It is found in New Guinea.
