= Schistophleps mundata =

Scientific classification
- Domain: Eukaryota
- Kingdom: Animalia
- Phylum: Arthropoda
- Class: Insecta
- Order: Lepidoptera
- Superfamily: Noctuoidea
- Family: Erebidae
- Subfamily: Arctiinae
- Genus: Schistophleps
- Species: S. mundata

Binomial name
- Schistophleps mundata Reich, 1957

Species of moth

Schistophleps mundata is a moth in the subfamily Arctiinae. It was described by Reich in 1957. It is found in China.
