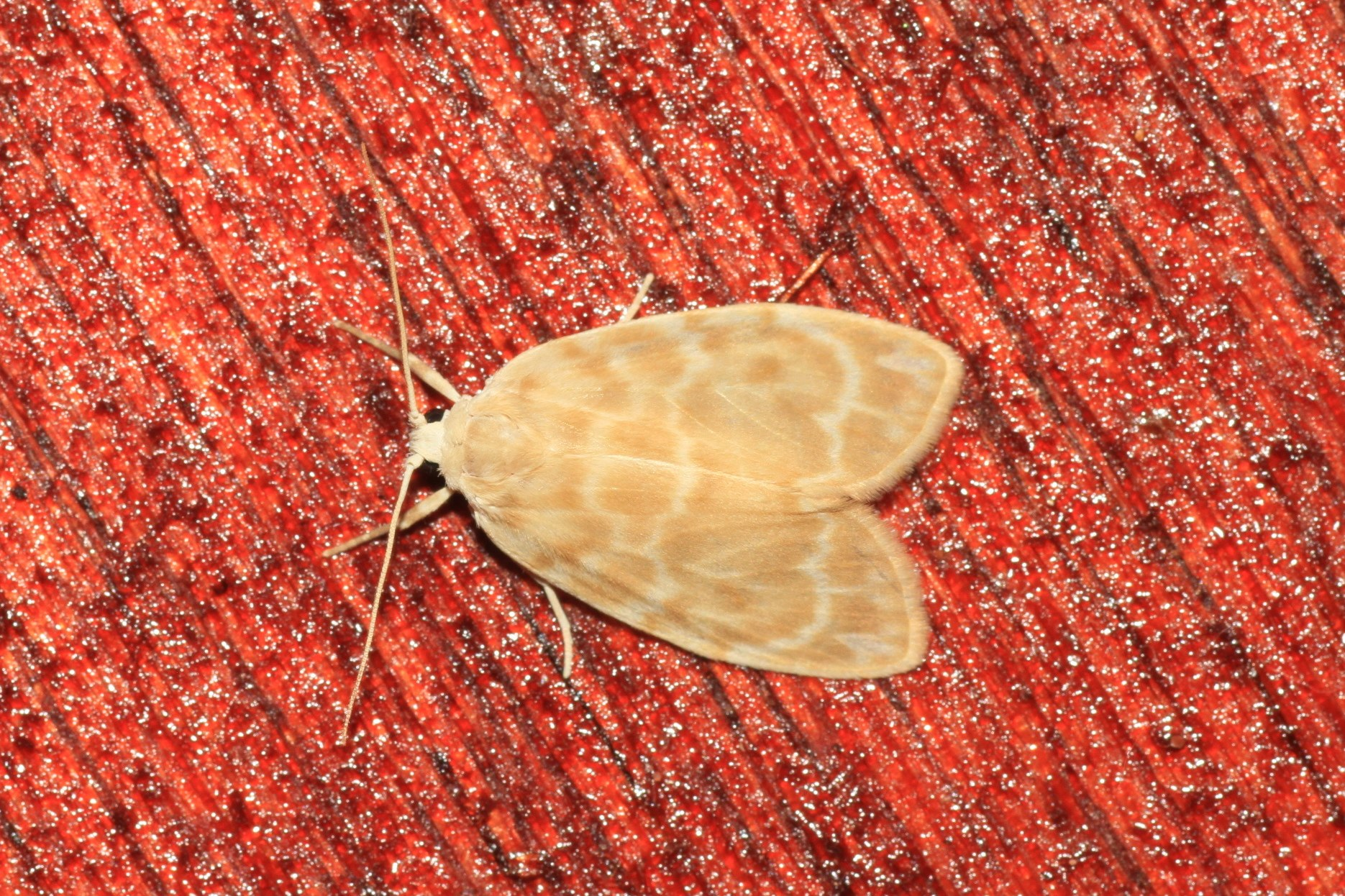

Scientific classification
- Kingdom: Animalia
- Phylum: Arthropoda
- Class: Insecta
- Order: Lepidoptera
- Superfamily: Noctuoidea
- Family: Erebidae
- Subfamily: Arctiinae
- Tribe: Lithosiini
- Subtribe: Nudariina
- Genus: Schistophleps; Hampson, 1891

Synonyms
- Phaneropseustis Turner, 1899

= Schistophleps =

Genus of moths

Schistophleps is a genus of moths in the family Erebidae first described by George Hampson in 1891.

== Description ==
Palpi porrect (extending forward) and short. Antennae with swollen basal joint clothed with long scales. Tibia with short spurs. Forewings with vein 3 from before angle of cell. Vein 5 from near center of discocellulars. Vein 6 from upper angle and veins 7, 8 and 9, 10 stalked. Vein 11 anastomosing (fusing) with vein 12. There are three veinlets between vein 12 and the costa. Hindwings with vein 3 from before angle of cell and vein 5 from above angle. Veins 6 and 7 stalked and vein 8 from near end of cell.

== Species ==
- Schistophleps albida Walker, 1864
- Schistophleps alluvifulvia Holloway, 2001
- Schistophleps bicolora Bethune-Baker, 1904
- Schistophleps bipuncta Hampson, 1891
- Schistophleps chamaitoides Rothschild, 1913
- Schistophleps costimacula Rothschild, 1913
- Schistophleps fulvia Hampson, 1900
- Schistophleps fulvioides Holloway, 2001
- Schistophleps hyalina Bethune-Baker, 1908
- Schistophleps irregularis Rothschild, 1916
- Schistophleps lobifulvia Holloway, 2001
- Schistophleps lofaushanensis Daniel, 1951
- Schistophleps major Roepke, 1946
- Schistophleps manusi Rothschild, 1916
- Schistophleps microfulvia Holloway, 2001
- Schistophleps minor Roepke, 1946
- Schistophleps mundata Reich, 1957
- Schistophleps nigropuncta Holloway, 2001
- Schistophleps noloides Rothschild, 1913
- Schistophleps obducta Lucas, 1893
- Schistophleps plagosus Rothschild, 1916
- Schistophleps punctifulvia Holloway, 2001
- Schistophleps pyrifulvia Holloway, 2001
- Schistophleps simillima Rothschild, 1913
- Schistophleps subtilis Holloway, 1979
