= Schistophleps fulvia =

Scientific classification
- Kingdom: Animalia
- Phylum: Arthropoda
- Class: Insecta
- Order: Lepidoptera
- Superfamily: Noctuoidea
- Family: Erebidae
- Subfamily: Arctiinae
- Genus: Schistophleps
- Species: S. fulvia

Binomial name
- Schistophleps fulvia Hampson, 1900

Species of moth

Schistophleps fulvia is a moth in the subfamily Arctiinae. It was described by George Hampson in 1900. It is found on Java and Bali.
