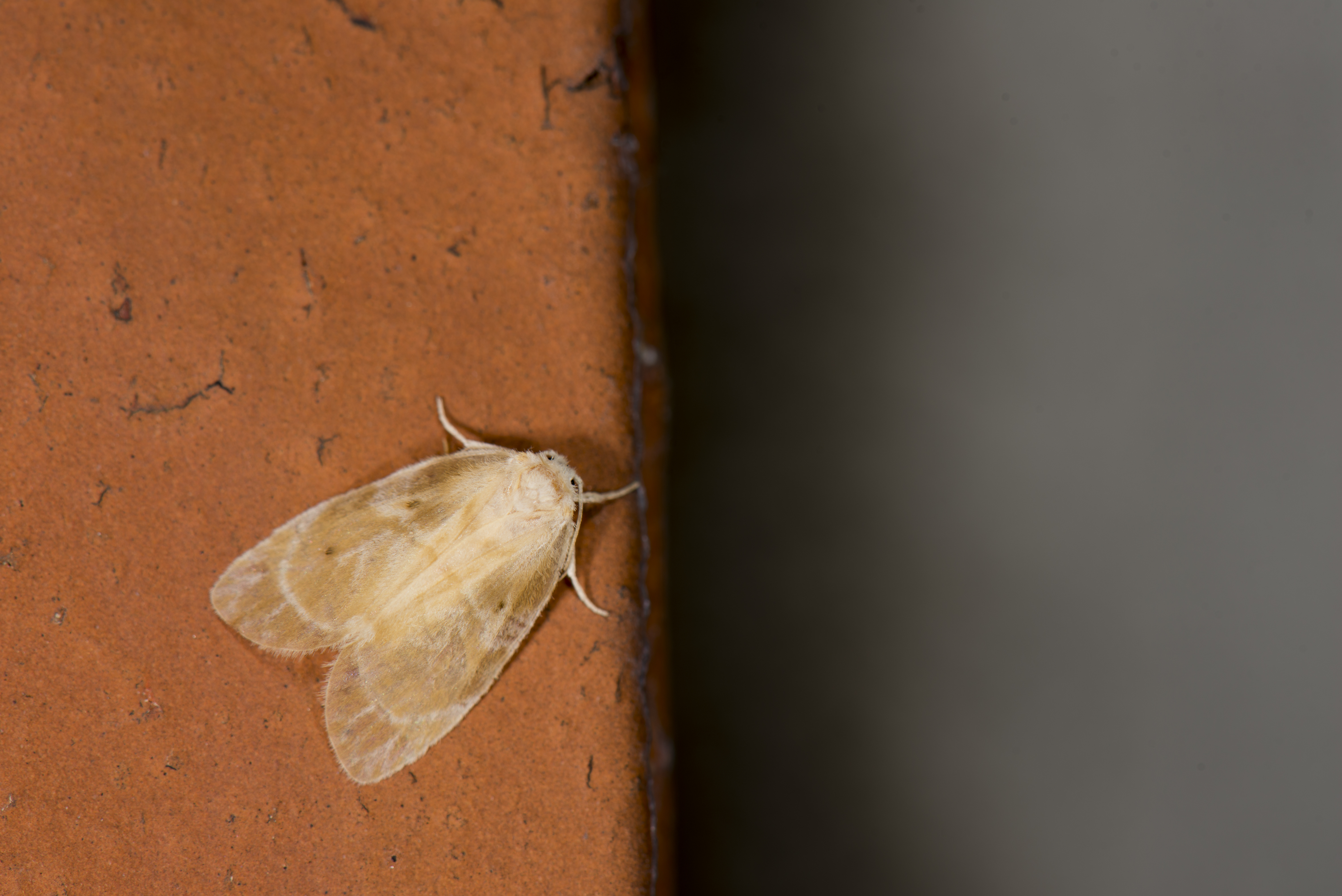

Scientific classification
- Kingdom: Animalia
- Phylum: Arthropoda
- Class: Insecta
- Order: Lepidoptera
- Superfamily: Noctuoidea
- Family: Erebidae
- Subfamily: Arctiinae
- Genus: Schistophleps
- Species: S. bipuncta

Binomial name
- Schistophleps bipuncta Hampson, 1891

Synonyms
- Schistophleps postmedialis Strand, 1917

= Schistophleps bipuncta =

Species of moth

Schistophleps bipuncta is a moth in the subfamily Arctiinae. It was described by George Hampson in 1891. It is found in India (Assam, Belgaum, Nilgiris), Sri Lanka and Myanmar.

== Description ==
Its wingspan is about 21 mm. It is an ochreous semi-diaphanous whitish moth. Forewings with an indistinct antemedial rufous line with some fuscous suffusion on it inner edge. There are black specks at center and end of cell. Postmedial discal area is suffused with rufus. A series of indistinct submarginal streaks and marginal specks present. Hindwings are hyaline (glass like).
