= Schistophleps albida =

Scientific classification
- Kingdom: Animalia
- Phylum: Arthropoda
- Class: Insecta
- Order: Lepidoptera
- Superfamily: Noctuoidea
- Family: Erebidae
- Subfamily: Arctiinae
- Genus: Schistophleps
- Species: S. albida

Binomial name
- Schistophleps albida (Walker, 1864)

Synonyms
- Nudaria albida Walker, [1865]; Phaneropseustis albida; Caulocera punctistriata Rothschild, 1913

Species of moth

Schistophleps albida is a moth in the family Erebidae. It was described by Francis Walker in 1864. It is found in Australia (Queensland, New South Wales) and New Guinea.

The wingspan is about 20 mm.
