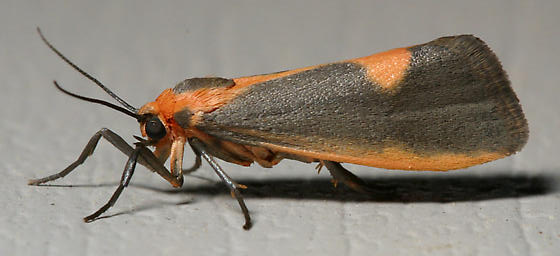
- Cisthenina

Scientific classification
- Kingdom: Animalia
- Phylum: Arthropoda
- Clade: Pancrustacea
- Class: Insecta
- Order: Lepidoptera
- Superfamily: Noctuoidea
- Family: Erebidae
- Subfamily: Arctiinae
- Tribe: Lithosiini
- Subtribe: Cisthenina; Bendib & Minet, 1999

= Cisthenina =

Subtribe of moths

The Cisthenina are a subtribe of lichen moths in the family Erebidae, currently containing 428 described species.

== Taxonomy ==
The subtribe used to be classified as the tribe Cisthenini of the subfamily Lithosiinae of the family Arctiidae.

== Genera ==
The following genera are included in the subtribe.

- Aemene
- Bruceia
- Byrsia
- Cisthene
- Clemensia
- Cyclosiella
- Cyclosodes
- Damias
- Eugoa
- Garudinia
- Garudinistis
- Haematomis
- Holocraspedon
- Hypoprepia
- Katmeteugoa
- Lobobasis
- Lycomorpha
- Lycomorphodes
- Macaduma
- Malesia
- Meteugoa
- Neoscaptia
- Oxacme
- Omiosia
- Padenia
- Parascaptia
- Propyria
- Pseudoblabes
- Ptychoglene
- Rhabdatomis
- Scaptesyle
- Tortricosia
- Utriculofera
