= Garudinia shompen =

Scientific classification
- Kingdom: Animalia
- Phylum: Arthropoda
- Clade: Pancrustacea
- Class: Insecta
- Order: Lepidoptera
- Superfamily: Noctuoidea
- Family: Erebidae
- Subfamily: Arctiinae
- Genus: Garudinia
- Species: G. shompen

Binomial name
- Garudinia shompen Singh, Ahmad, Raha 2022

Species of moth

Garudinia shompen is a species of moth in the family Erebidae. It was formally described as a new species by Navneet Singh, Jalil Ahmad and Angshuman Raha in 2022 from specimens collected on Great Nicobar Island, India. The species is known from low-elevation dipterocarp forests of the island.

== Taxonomy ==
It is a species of moth in the family Erebidae and subfamily Arctiinae. It belongs to the genus Garudinia. The species was formally described as new by Navneet Singh, Jalil Ahmad and Angshuman Raha in 2022.

The species was described as part of the Garudinia bimaculata–simulana–acornuta species group. The authors distinguished G. shompen from its similar congeners using a combination of external morphological characters and male genitalia.

== Description ==
The species is distinguished from its closely related species by a combination of external wing characters and male genital characters. On the forewing, the postmedial band has a distinct medial bulge along its inner margin, which is an important diagnostic character of the species. The hindwing is ochreous white and lacks suffusion, a feature noted in comparison with related species, particularly Garudinia simulana. Further differences are found in the male genitalia. In G. shompen, the distal portion of the saccular process is short, slender and curved. These external and genitalic characters were used by Singh, Ahmad and Raha to distinguish the species from similar members of the genus.

The original description included habitus photographs and genitalia illustrations, together with diagnoses and comparisons of the species with similar congeners. At the time of its description, the female of G. shompen was unknown. The known specimens were collected from Great Nicobar Island in the Nicobar Islands, India, and the species was recorded from low-elevation dipterocarp forest. The type material consisted of male specimens collected during a Zoological Survey of India expedition to Great Nicobar Island in November 2018.
