= Malesia (disambiguation) =

Malesia may refer to:

- Malesia, the biogeographical region straddling the Indomalayan and Australasian realms
- Malesia (moth), a moth genus
- Malësi e Madhe District, one of the thirty-six political districts of Albania
- Malësia, a geographical region in northern Albania and eastern central Montenegro
  - Malesia, Montenegro, a geographical region in Montenegro
- Malesia, North Macedonia (Cyrillic: Малесија), a geographical region in North Macedonia
- Malesia (book), 1884 book by botanist Odoardo Beccari
