= Oxacme commotoides =

Scientific classification
- Kingdom: Animalia
- Phylum: Arthropoda
- Clade: Pancrustacea
- Class: Insecta
- Order: Lepidoptera
- Superfamily: Noctuoidea
- Family: Erebidae
- Subfamily: Arctiinae
- Genus: Oxacme
- Species: O. commotoides

Binomial name
- Oxacme commotoides Holloway, 2001

Species of moth

Oxacme commotoides is a moth in the subfamily Arctiinae. It was described by Jeremy Daniel Holloway in 2001. It is found on Borneo. The habitat consists of lower montane forests and dipterocarp forests.

The length of the forewings is 8 mm for males and 8–9 mm for females.
