= Garudinistis eburneana =

Scientific classification
- Kingdom: Animalia
- Phylum: Arthropoda
- Class: Insecta
- Order: Lepidoptera
- Superfamily: Noctuoidea
- Family: Erebidae
- Subfamily: Arctiinae
- Genus: Garudinistis
- Species: G. eburneana

Binomial name
- Garudinistis eburneana (Walker, 1863)

Synonyms
- Tospitis eburneana Walker, 1863

Species of moth

Garudinistis eburneana is a moth of the family Erebidae. It was described by Francis Walker in 1863. It is found on Borneo, Sumatra and Java. The habitat consists of lower montane forests, coastal forests and secondary vegetation and lowland dipterocarp forests.
