= Garudinia biplagiata =

Scientific classification
- Kingdom: Animalia
- Phylum: Arthropoda
- Class: Insecta
- Order: Lepidoptera
- Superfamily: Noctuoidea
- Family: Erebidae
- Subfamily: Arctiinae
- Genus: Garudinia
- Species: G. biplagiata

Binomial name
- Garudinia biplagiata Hampson, 1896

Species of moth

Garudinia biplagiata is a moth of the family Erebidae first described by George Hampson in 1896. It is found in Bhutan.
