= Garudinia latana =

Scientific classification
- Kingdom: Animalia
- Phylum: Arthropoda
- Class: Insecta
- Order: Lepidoptera
- Superfamily: Noctuoidea
- Family: Erebidae
- Subfamily: Arctiinae
- Genus: Garudinia
- Species: G. latana

Binomial name
- Garudinia latana (Walker, 1863)

Synonyms
- Tospitis latana Walker, 1863

Species of moth

Garudinia latana is a moth of the family Erebidae first described by Francis Walker in 1863. It is found in Sri Lanka.

== Description ==
The wingspan of the male is 16 mm and 19 mm in the female. In the male, the head and thorax are white, whereas the abdomen is yellowish white. Forewings white with a purplish brown sub-basal blotch from the sub-costal nervure to inner margin. A broad sub-marginal band found at costa, where the apex suffused with fuscous. As in most Lepidoptera, the female is larger than the male.
