= Haematomis mexicana =

Mexican lichen moth

Scientific classification
- Domain: Eukaryota
- Kingdom: Animalia
- Phylum: Arthropoda
- Class: Insecta
- Order: Lepidoptera
- Superfamily: Noctuoidea
- Family: Erebidae
- Subfamily: Arctiinae
- Genus: Haematomis
- Species: H. mexicana

Binomial name
- Haematomis mexicana (H. Druce, 1885)

Synonyms
- Lithosia mexicana H. Druce, 1885

Species of moth

Haematomis mexicana, the Mexican lichen moth, is a moth of the family Erebidae. It was described by Herbert Druce in 1885. It is found in Mexico and Guatemala.
