= Lycomorpha splendens =

Scientific classification
- Domain: Eukaryota
- Kingdom: Animalia
- Phylum: Arthropoda
- Class: Insecta
- Order: Lepidoptera
- Superfamily: Noctuoidea
- Family: Erebidae
- Subfamily: Arctiinae
- Genus: Lycomorpha
- Species: L. splendens

Binomial name
- Lycomorpha splendens Barnes & McDunnough, 1912

Species of moth

Lycomorpha splendens is a moth of the family Erebidae. It was described by William Barnes and James Halliday McDunnough in 1912. It is found in North America, including Arizona, California, Nevada, New Mexico, Texas and Utah.

The length of the forewings is 12–15 mm. Adults are on wing from May to October.
