= Garudinia =

Scientific classification
- Kingdom: Animalia
- Phylum: Arthropoda
- Clade: Pancrustacea
- Class: Insecta
- Order: Lepidoptera
- Superfamily: Noctuoidea
- Family: Erebidae
- Subfamily: Arctiinae
- Tribe: Lithosiini
- Subtribe: Cisthenina
- Genus: Garudinia; Moore, 1882

Genus of moths

Garudinia is a genus of moths in the subfamily Arctiinae first described by Frederic Moore in 1882.

== Description ==
Palpi upturned, slender and not reaching the vertex of head. Antennae minutely ciliated. Forewing narrow with arched costa. Veins 3 and 4 stalked, vein 5 absent, vein 6 from angle of cell. Veins 7 and 8 stalked and vein 10 absent. Male with a patch of modified scales in the cell. Hindwings of male excised at apex, with vein 6 absent. Female with stalked veins 3 and 4, vein 5 from above angle of cell, stalked veins 6 and 7 and vein 8 from middle of cell. Forewings of male with a large costal fold and female with small of it.

== Species ==
- Garudinia acornuta
- Garudinia bimaculata
- Garudinia biplagiata
- Garudinia conjuncta Kirti & Gill, 2008
- Garudinia latana
- Garudinia macrolatana
- Garudinia pseudolatana
- Garudinia pseudosimulana Kirti & Gill, 2008
- Garudinia shompen
- Garudinia simulana
- Garudinia successana
- Garudinia triangulata
- Garudinia truncata
