= Oxacme marginata =

Scientific classification
- Kingdom: Animalia
- Phylum: Arthropoda
- Class: Insecta
- Order: Lepidoptera
- Superfamily: Noctuoidea
- Family: Erebidae
- Subfamily: Arctiinae
- Genus: Oxacme
- Species: O. marginata

Binomial name
- Oxacme marginata Hampson, 1896

Species of moth

Oxacme marginata is a moth of the subfamily Arctiinae. It was described by George Hampson in 1896. It is found in Myanmar and Assam, India.
