= Ptychoglene pertunda =

Scientific classification
- Domain: Eukaryota
- Kingdom: Animalia
- Phylum: Arthropoda
- Class: Insecta
- Order: Lepidoptera
- Superfamily: Noctuoidea
- Family: Erebidae
- Subfamily: Arctiinae
- Genus: Ptychoglene
- Species: P. pertunda

Binomial name
- Ptychoglene pertunda H. Druce, 1889

Species of moth

Ptychoglene pertunda is a moth in the subfamily Arctiinae. It was described by Herbert Druce in 1889. It is found in Mexico.
