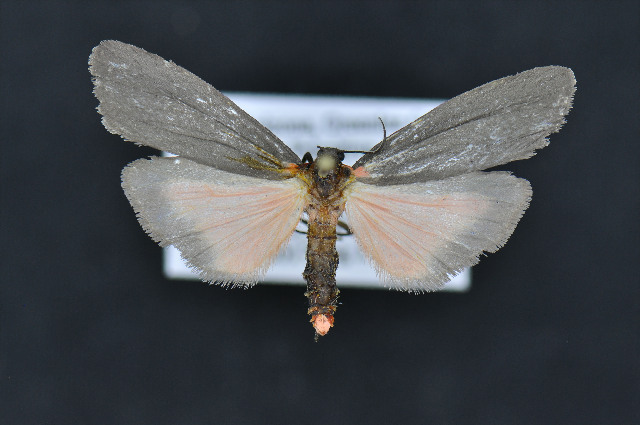

Scientific classification
- Domain: Eukaryota
- Kingdom: Animalia
- Phylum: Arthropoda
- Class: Insecta
- Order: Lepidoptera
- Superfamily: Noctuoidea
- Family: Erebidae
- Subfamily: Arctiinae
- Genus: Hypoprepia
- Species: H. inculta

Binomial name
- Hypoprepia inculta H. Edwards, 1882

= Hypoprepia inculta =

Species of moth

Hypoprepia inculta is a moth of the family Erebidae. It was described by Henry Edwards in 1882. It is found in the US Rocky Mountain states from the Mexico border north to southern Wyoming and the Black Hills of South Dakota. The habitat consists of bunchgrass steppe.
