= Cyclosiella dulciculoides =

Scientific classification
- Kingdom: Animalia
- Phylum: Arthropoda
- Clade: Pancrustacea
- Class: Insecta
- Order: Lepidoptera
- Superfamily: Noctuoidea
- Family: Erebidae
- Subfamily: Arctiinae
- Genus: Cyclosiella
- Species: C. dulciculoides

Binomial name
- Cyclosiella dulciculoides Holloway, 2001

Species of moth

Cyclosiella dulciculoides is a moth of the family Erebidae first described by Jeremy Daniel Holloway in 2001. It is found on Borneo. The habitat consists of lowland forests, including swamp forests.
