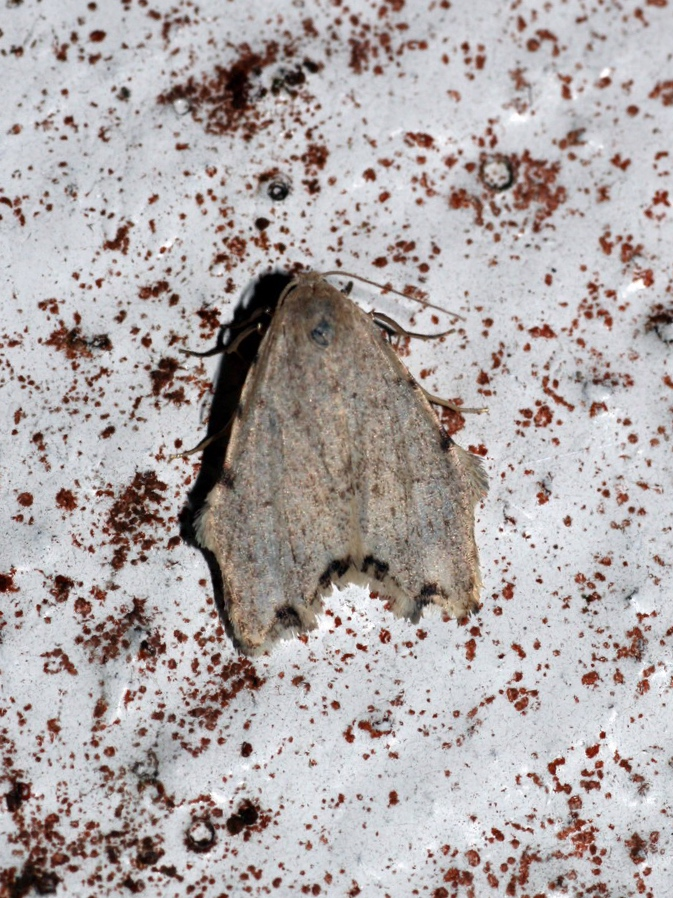

Scientific classification
- Kingdom: Animalia
- Phylum: Arthropoda
- Class: Insecta
- Order: Lepidoptera
- Superfamily: Noctuoidea
- Family: Erebidae
- Subfamily: Arctiinae
- Genus: Tortricosia
- Species: T. excisa

Binomial name
- Tortricosia excisa Hampson, 1900

= Tortricosia excisa =

Species of moth

Tortricosia excisa is a moth in the subfamily Arctiinae first described by George Hampson in 1900. It is found in Myanmar, Peninsular Malaysia and Borneo. The habitat consists of lowland forests, including heath forests and disturbed areas.

== Description ==
The species' general appearance is similar to Utriculofera fuscapex, though larger.
