= Rhabdatomis zaba =

Scientific classification
- Kingdom: Animalia
- Phylum: Arthropoda
- Class: Insecta
- Order: Lepidoptera
- Superfamily: Noctuoidea
- Family: Erebidae
- Subfamily: Arctiinae
- Genus: Rhabdatomis
- Species: R. zaba

Binomial name
- Rhabdatomis zaba Dyar, 1907

Species of moth

Rhabdatomis zaba is a moth in the subfamily Arctiinae. It was described by Harrison Gray Dyar Jr. in 1907. It is found in Mexico.
