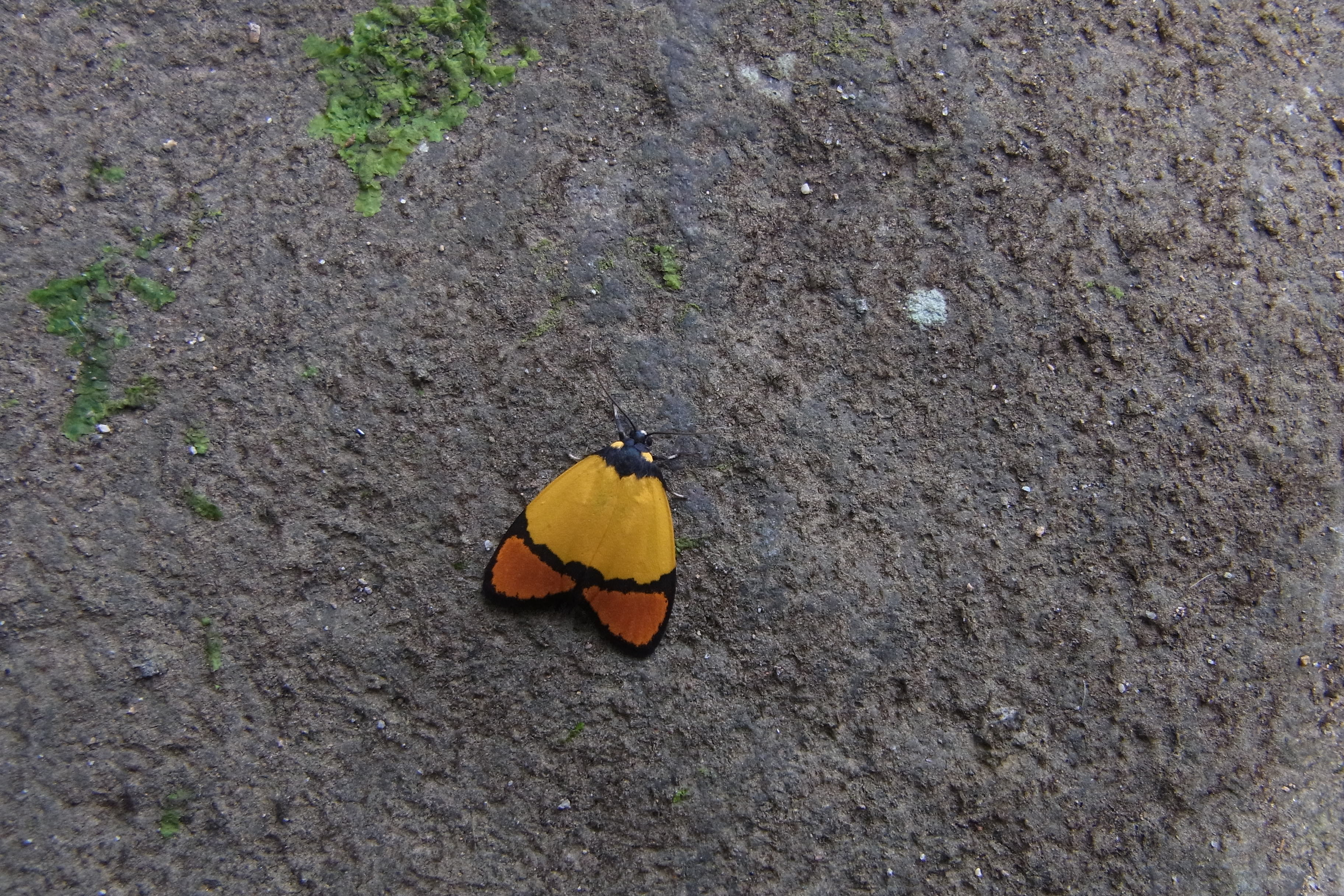

Scientific classification
- Kingdom: Animalia
- Phylum: Arthropoda
- Class: Insecta
- Order: Lepidoptera
- Superfamily: Noctuoidea
- Family: Erebidae
- Subfamily: Arctiinae
- Genus: Byrsia
- Species: B. aurantiaca

Binomial name
- Byrsia aurantiaca (Snellen, 1886)

Synonyms
- Hypocrita aurantiaca Snellen, 1886; Byrisa aurantiaca javana Rothschild & Jordan, 1901

= Byrsia aurantiaca =

Species of moth

Byrsia aurantiaca is a moth of the family Erebidae. It is found on Malacca, Borneo and Sumatra.

It is a day-flying species.
