= Byrsia buruana =

Scientific classification
- Kingdom: Animalia
- Phylum: Arthropoda
- Class: Insecta
- Order: Lepidoptera
- Superfamily: Noctuoidea
- Family: Erebidae
- Subfamily: Arctiinae
- Genus: Byrsia
- Species: B. buruana

Binomial name
- Byrsia buruana van Eecke, 1929

Species of moth

Byrsia buruana is a moth of the family Erebidae. It is found on Buru.
