= Utriculofera leucogrammus =

Scientific classification
- Kingdom: Animalia
- Phylum: Arthropoda
- Class: Insecta
- Order: Lepidoptera
- Superfamily: Noctuoidea
- Family: Erebidae
- Subfamily: Arctiinae
- Genus: Utriculofera
- Species: U. leucogrammus

Binomial name
- Utriculofera leucogrammus Rothschild, 1916

Species of moth

Utriculofera leucogrammus is a moth in the subfamily Arctiinae. It was described by Rothschild in 1916. It is found on the Admiralty Islands to the north of New Guinea in the South Pacific Ocean.
