= Haematomis uniformis =

Scientific classification
- Kingdom: Animalia
- Phylum: Arthropoda
- Class: Insecta
- Order: Lepidoptera
- Superfamily: Noctuoidea
- Family: Erebidae
- Subfamily: Arctiinae
- Genus: Haematomis
- Species: H. uniformis

Binomial name
- Haematomis uniformis Schaus, 1899

Species of moth

Haematomis uniformis is a moth of the family Erebidae. It was described by William Schaus in 1899. It is found in North America from Arizona and the Big Bend region of Texas to Mexico.

Adults are on wing from July to September.
