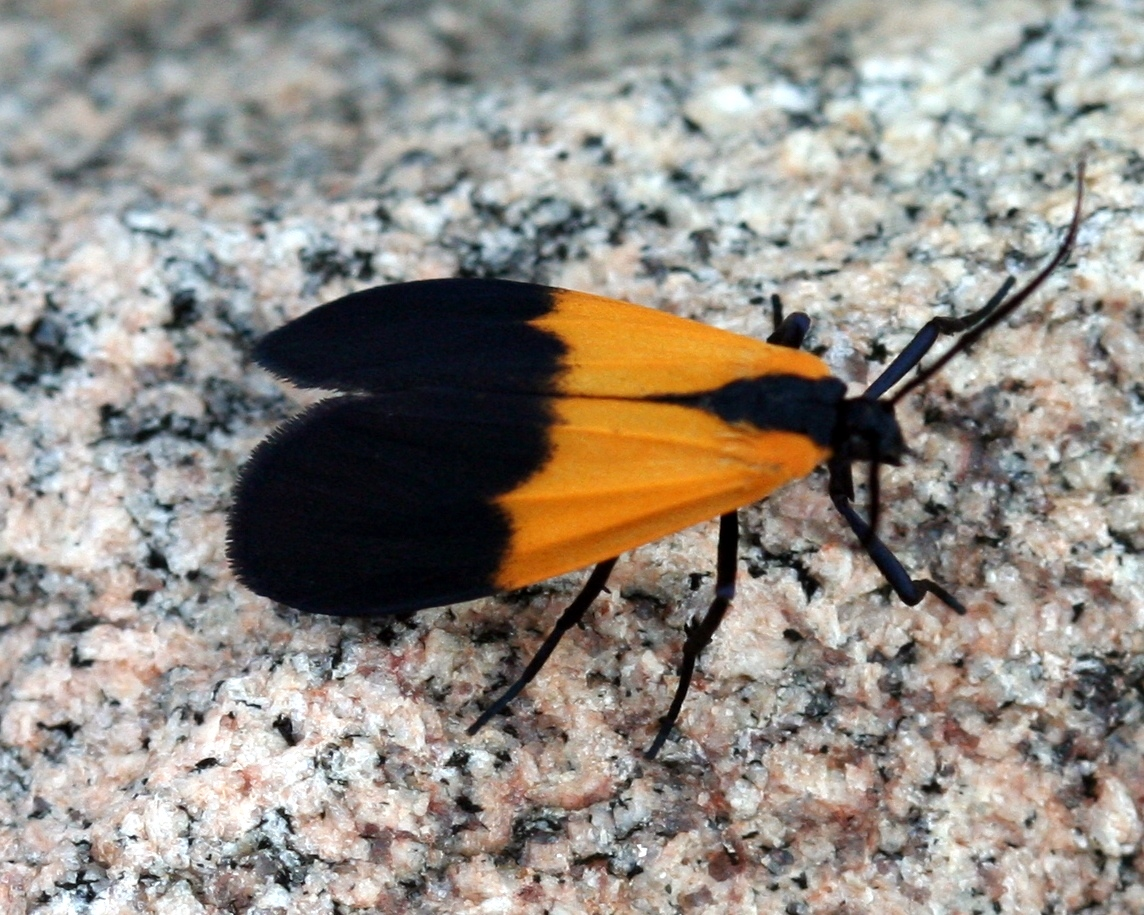

Scientific classification
- Domain: Eukaryota
- Kingdom: Animalia
- Phylum: Arthropoda
- Class: Insecta
- Order: Lepidoptera
- Superfamily: Noctuoidea
- Family: Erebidae
- Subfamily: Arctiinae
- Genus: Lycomorpha
- Species: L. pholus

Binomial name
- Lycomorpha pholus (Drury, 1773)

Synonyms
- Sphinx pholus Drury, 1773; Phalaena pholus; Lycomorpha miniata Packard, 1872

= Lycomorpha pholus =

Species of moth

Lycomorpha pholus, the black-and-yellow lichen moth, is a moth in the family Erebidae. It is found in North America from Nova Scotia to North Carolina, west to South Dakota and Texas. The habitat consists of short-grass prairie.

The wingspan is 25–32 mm.

The larvae feed on lichen and resemble their host.

== Subspecies ==
- Lycomorpha pholus pholus
- Lycomorpha pholus miniata Packard, 1872 (central North American)
