= Omiosia =

Scientific classification
- Kingdom: Animalia
- Phylum: Arthropoda
- Class: Insecta
- Order: Lepidoptera
- Superfamily: Noctuoidea
- Family: Erebidae
- Subfamily: Arctiinae
- Subtribe: Cisthenina
- Genus: Omiosia; Hampson, 1900
- Species: O. fusipennana

Binomial name
- Omiosia fusipennana (Walker, 1863)

Synonyms
- Tospitis fusipennana Walker, 1863

Genus of moths

Omiosia is a monotypic moth genus in the subfamily Arctiinae erected by George Hampson in 1900. Its single species, Omiosia fuscipennana, was first described by Francis Walker in 1863. It is found on Borneo. The habitat consists of lowland forests.
