= Garudinia successana =

Scientific classification
- Kingdom: Animalia
- Phylum: Arthropoda
- Class: Insecta
- Order: Lepidoptera
- Superfamily: Noctuoidea
- Family: Erebidae
- Subfamily: Arctiinae
- Genus: Garudinia
- Species: G. successana

Binomial name
- Garudinia successana (Walker, 1866)

Synonyms
- Tospitis successana Walker, 1866

Species of moth

Garudinia successana is a moth of the family Erebidae first described by Francis Walker in 1866. It is found on Sulawesi in Indonesia.
