= Rhabdatomis laudamia =

Scientific classification
- Kingdom: Animalia
- Phylum: Arthropoda
- Class: Insecta
- Order: Lepidoptera
- Superfamily: Noctuoidea
- Family: Erebidae
- Subfamily: Arctiinae
- Genus: Rhabdatomis
- Species: R. laudamia

Binomial name
- Rhabdatomis laudamia (H. Druce, 1885)

Synonyms
- Lithosia laudamia H. Druce, 1885; Lithosia pusa Dognin, 1892; Lithosia peruviana Schaus, 1894

Species of moth

Rhabdatomis laudamia is a moth in the subfamily Arctiinae. It was described by Herbert Druce in 1885. It is found in Arizona, Guatemala, Costa Rica, Panama, Ecuador, Peru and Rio de Janeiro, Brazil.
