= Oxacme commota =

Scientific classification
- Domain: Eukaryota
- Kingdom: Animalia
- Phylum: Arthropoda
- Class: Insecta
- Order: Lepidoptera
- Superfamily: Noctuoidea
- Family: Erebidae
- Subfamily: Arctiinae
- Genus: Oxacme
- Species: O. commota

Binomial name
- Oxacme commota (van Eecke, 1927)

Synonyms
- Siccia commota van Eecke, 1927

Species of moth

Oxacme commota is a moth in the subfamily Arctiinae. It was described by Rudolf van Eecke in 1927. It is found on Sumatra in Indonesia.
