= Meteugoa melanoleuca =

Scientific classification
- Kingdom: Animalia
- Phylum: Arthropoda
- Class: Insecta
- Order: Lepidoptera
- Superfamily: Noctuoidea
- Family: Erebidae
- Subfamily: Arctiinae
- Genus: Meteugoa
- Species: M. melanoleuca

Binomial name
- Meteugoa melanoleuca Hampson, 1901

Species of moth

Meteugoa melanoleuca is a moth of the family Erebidae. It was described by George Hampson in 1901. It is found on New Guinea.
