= Byrsia dotata =

Scientific classification
- Kingdom: Animalia
- Phylum: Arthropoda
- Class: Insecta
- Order: Lepidoptera
- Superfamily: Noctuoidea
- Family: Erebidae
- Subfamily: Arctiinae
- Genus: Byrsia
- Species: B. dotata

Binomial name
- Byrsia dotata Walker, 1865

Synonyms
- Cyme princeps Felder, 1875; Byrsia latiplaga Rothschild, 1912; Byrsia reducta Rothschild, 1912; Byrsia dotata var. celebensis Rothschild & Jordan, 1901

Species of moth

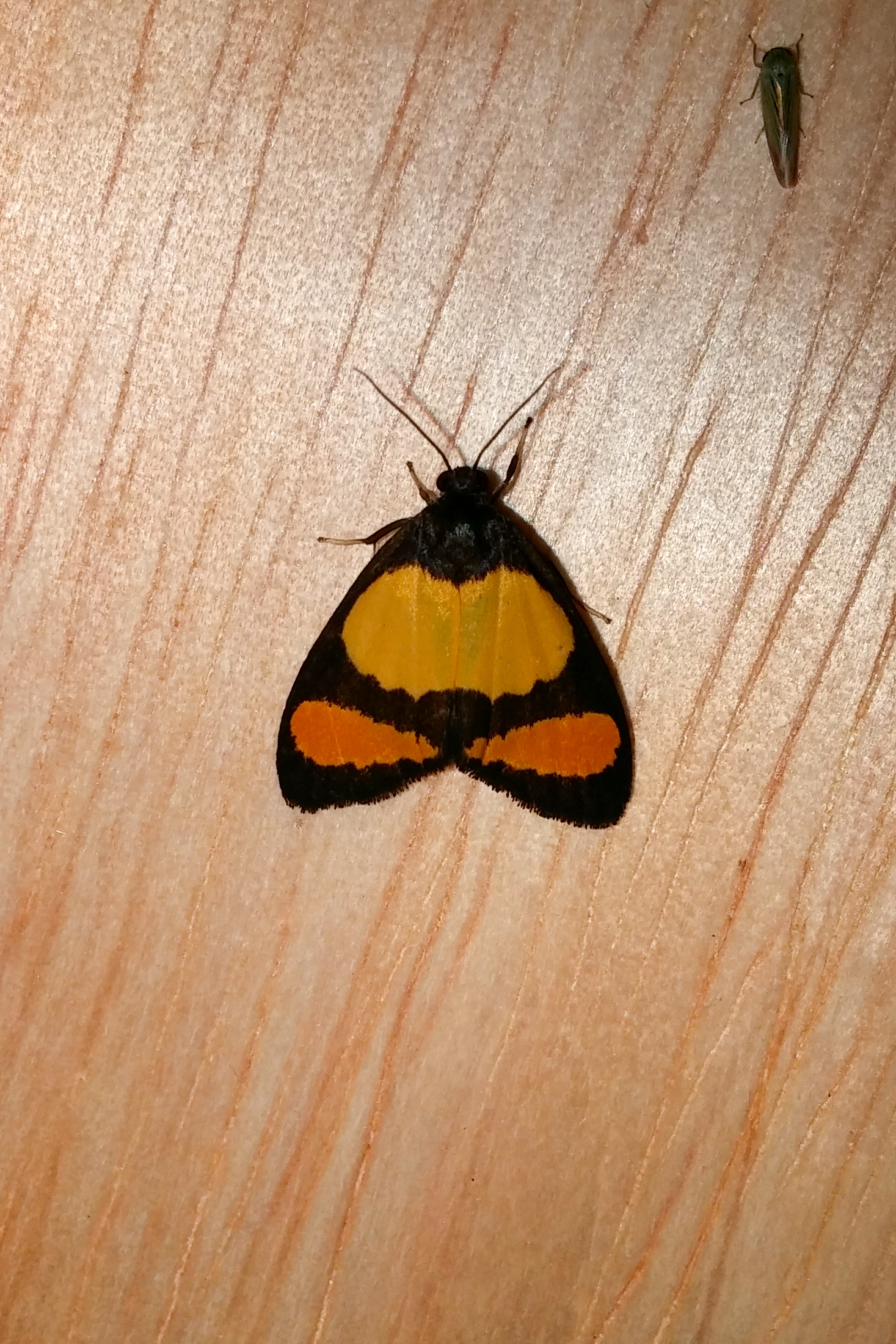

Byrsia dotata is a moth of the family Erebidae. It was described by Francis Walker in 1865. It is found on Sulawesi, Ambon Island, Batchian, Timor and New Guinea.

== Subspecies ==
- Byrsia dotata dotata
- Byrsia dotata ornata Rothschild & Jordan, 1901
- Byrsia dotata pallidior Rothschild, 1912
- Byrsia dotata papuana Rothschild & Jordan, 1901
