= Oxacme dissimilis =

Scientific classification
- Kingdom: Animalia
- Phylum: Arthropoda
- Class: Insecta
- Order: Lepidoptera
- Superfamily: Noctuoidea
- Family: Erebidae
- Subfamily: Arctiinae
- Genus: Oxacme
- Species: O. dissimilis

Binomial name
- Oxacme dissimilis Hampson, 1894

Species of moth

Oxacme dissimilis is a moth of the subfamily Arctiinae. It was described by George Hampson in 1894. It is found in Sikkim, India.
