= Bruceia hubbardi =

Scientific classification
- Kingdom: Animalia
- Phylum: Arthropoda
- Class: Insecta
- Order: Lepidoptera
- Superfamily: Noctuoidea
- Family: Erebidae
- Subfamily: Arctiinae
- Genus: Bruceia
- Species: B. hubbardi

Binomial name
- Bruceia hubbardi Dyar, 1898

Species of moth

Bruceia hubbardi is a moth of the family Erebidae. It was described by Harrison Gray Dyar Jr. in 1898. It is found in the US states of California and Nevada to Colorado and western Texas.

The wingspan is 22–25 mm. Adults are on wing from June to September.
