= Lycomorpha desertus =

Scientific classification
- Domain: Eukaryota
- Kingdom: Animalia
- Phylum: Arthropoda
- Class: Insecta
- Order: Lepidoptera
- Superfamily: Noctuoidea
- Family: Erebidae
- Subfamily: Arctiinae
- Genus: Lycomorpha
- Species: L. desertus

Binomial name
- Lycomorpha desertus H. Edwards, 1881

Species of moth

Lycomorpha desertus is a moth of the family Erebidae. It was described by Henry Edwards in 1881. It is found in the US state of Arizona.
