= Hypoprepia cadaverosa =

Scientific classification
- Domain: Eukaryota
- Kingdom: Animalia
- Phylum: Arthropoda
- Class: Insecta
- Order: Lepidoptera
- Superfamily: Noctuoidea
- Family: Erebidae
- Subfamily: Arctiinae
- Genus: Hypoprepia
- Species: H. cadaverosa

Binomial name
- Hypoprepia cadaverosa Strecker, 1878

Species of moth

Hypoprepia cadaverosa is a moth of the family Erebidae. It was described by Herman Strecker in 1878. It is found in the US states of Colorado, Utah, South Carolina, South Dakota, Arizona, New Mexico and Texas.

The wingspan is about 24 mm. The forewings are pale ochreous with three slate coloured bands. The hindwings are also ochreous, but somewhat paler. The costal margin is slate coloured. Adults are on wing from May to August.
