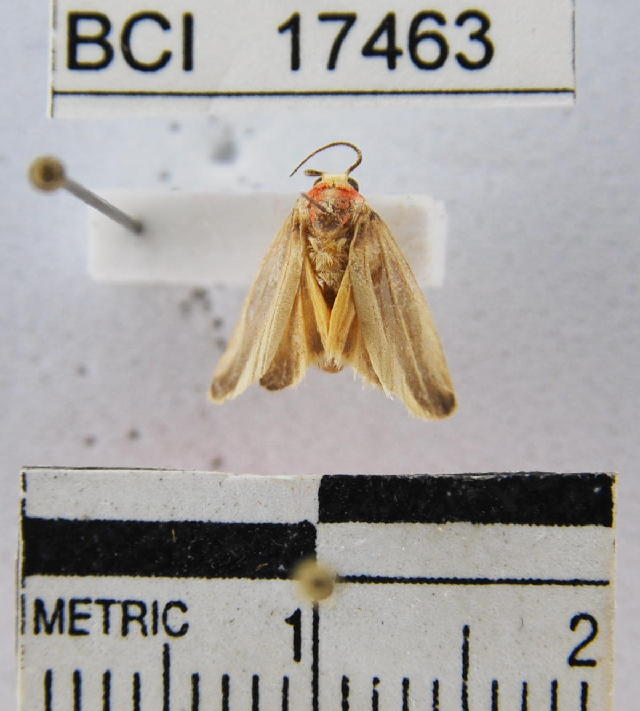

Scientific classification
- Kingdom: Animalia
- Phylum: Arthropoda
- Class: Insecta
- Order: Lepidoptera
- Superfamily: Noctuoidea
- Family: Erebidae
- Subfamily: Arctiinae
- Genus: Rhabdatomis
- Species: R. cora

Binomial name
- Rhabdatomis cora (Dyar, 1907)

Synonyms
- Diarhabdosia cora Dyar, 1907; Diarhabdosia coroides Schaus, 1911

= Rhabdatomis cora =

Species of moth

Rhabdatomis cora is a moth in the subfamily Arctiinae. It was described by Harrison Gray Dyar Jr. in 1907. It is found in French Guiana, Panama and Costa Rica.

== Subspecies ==
- Rhabdatomis cora cora (French Guiana)
- Rhabdatomis cora coroides (Schaus, 1911) (Costa Rica)
