= Tortricosia pallidexcisa =

Scientific classification
- Kingdom: Animalia
- Phylum: Arthropoda
- Clade: Pancrustacea
- Class: Insecta
- Order: Lepidoptera
- Superfamily: Noctuoidea
- Family: Erebidae
- Subfamily: Arctiinae
- Genus: Tortricosia
- Species: T. pallidexcisa

Binomial name
- Tortricosia pallidexcisa Holloway, 2001

Species of moth

Tortricosia pallidexcisa is a moth in the subfamily Arctiinae. It was described by Jeremy Daniel Holloway in 2001. It is found on Borneo.

The length of the forewings is about 10 mm.
