= Byrsia =

Scientific classification
- Kingdom: Animalia
- Phylum: Arthropoda
- Class: Insecta
- Order: Lepidoptera
- Superfamily: Noctuoidea
- Family: Erebidae
- Subfamily: Arctiinae
- Subtribe: Cisthenina
- Genus: Byrsia; Walker, 1865

Genus of moths

Byrsia is a genus of moths in the family Erebidae. Its type species is Byrsia dotata. Distribution of the genus ranges from Sundaland to the Solomon Islands.

== Species ==
- Byrsia amoena
- Byrsia aurantiaca
- Byrsia buruana
- Byrsia dotata
