= Oxacme =

Scientific classification
- Kingdom: Animalia
- Phylum: Arthropoda
- Class: Insecta
- Order: Lepidoptera
- Superfamily: Noctuoidea
- Family: Erebidae
- Subfamily: Arctiinae
- Subtribe: Cisthenina
- Genus: Oxacme; Hampson, 1894

Genus of moths

Oxacme is a genus of moths in the subfamily Arctiinae. The genus was erected by George Hampson in 1894.

== Species ==
- Oxacme asymmetrica Holloway, 2001
- Oxacme calcarea Holloway, 2001
- Oxacme commota (van Eecke, 1927)
- Oxacme commotoides Holloway, 2001
- Oxacme cretacea (Hampson, 1914)
- Oxacme dissimilis Hampson, 1894
- Oxacme marginata Hampson, 1896
- Oxacme umbrodorsum Holloway, 2001
