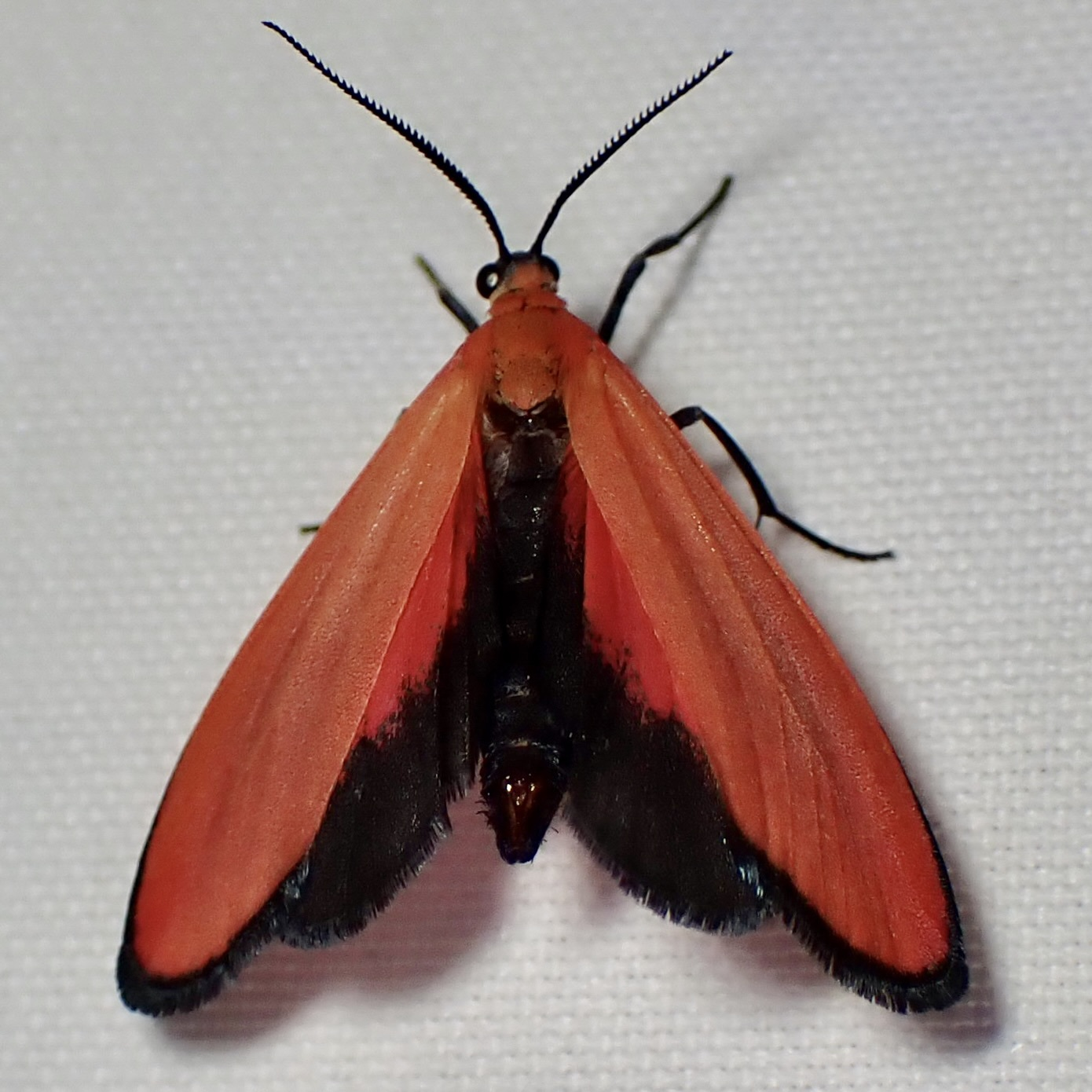

Scientific classification
- Domain: Eukaryota
- Kingdom: Animalia
- Phylum: Arthropoda
- Class: Insecta
- Order: Lepidoptera
- Superfamily: Noctuoidea
- Family: Erebidae
- Subfamily: Arctiinae
- Genus: Lycomorpha
- Species: L. regulus

Binomial name
- Lycomorpha regulus (Grinnell, 1903)

Synonyms
- Anatolmis regulus Grinnell, 1903

= Lycomorpha regulus =

Species of moth

Lycomorpha regulus is a species of moth in the family Erebidae. It was first described by Fordyce Grinnell Jr. in 1903. It is found in North America, including Arizona, California, Colorado and Utah.

The larvae feed on lichens of the genus Parmelia, including Parmelia plittii.
