= Padenia =

Scientific classification
- Domain: Eukaryota
- Kingdom: Animalia
- Phylum: Arthropoda
- Class: Insecta
- Order: Lepidoptera
- Superfamily: Noctuoidea
- Family: Erebidae
- Subfamily: Arctiinae
- Subtribe: Cisthenina
- Genus: Padenia; Moore, 1882

Genus of moths

Padenia is a genus of moths in the subfamily Arctiinae described by Frederic Moore in 1882.

== Description ==
Palpi porrect (extending forward), reaching beyond the frons. Antennae minutely ciliated in both sexes with long spurs in tibia. Forewings with highly arched costa. Male with veins 3 and 4 from far before end of cell. Veins 5 and 6 absent. Veins 7 to 9 stalked. Female with vein 3 from near angle of cell. Veins 4 and 5 stalked, and vein 6 absent. Hindwings of male excised at apex with a fringe of long hair on apical portion of costa. vein 6 absent. Female with veins 3 and 4 stalked. Vein 5 from angle of cell, veins 6 and 7 stalked, vein 8 from near end of cell. Forewings of male with a strong costal fold and female has a slight fold.

== Species ==
- Padenia acutifascia De Joannis, 1928
- Padenia bifasciatus Rothschild, 1912
- Padenia cupreifascia Rothschild, 1912
- Padenia duplicana Walker, 1863
- Padenia intermedia van Eecke, 1929
- Padenia moluccensis van Eecke, 1920
- Padenia obliquifascia Rothschild, 1920
- Padenia sordida Rothschild, 1912
- Padenia transversa Walker, 1854
- Padenia triseparata Debauche, 1938
