= Padenia intermedia =

Scientific classification
- Kingdom: Animalia
- Phylum: Arthropoda
- Class: Insecta
- Order: Lepidoptera
- Superfamily: Noctuoidea
- Family: Erebidae
- Subfamily: Arctiinae
- Genus: Padenia
- Species: P. intermedia

Binomial name
- Padenia intermedia van Eecke, 1929

Species of moth

Padenia intermedia is a moth of the subfamily Arctiinae. It was described by van Eecke in 1929. It is found on Buru.
