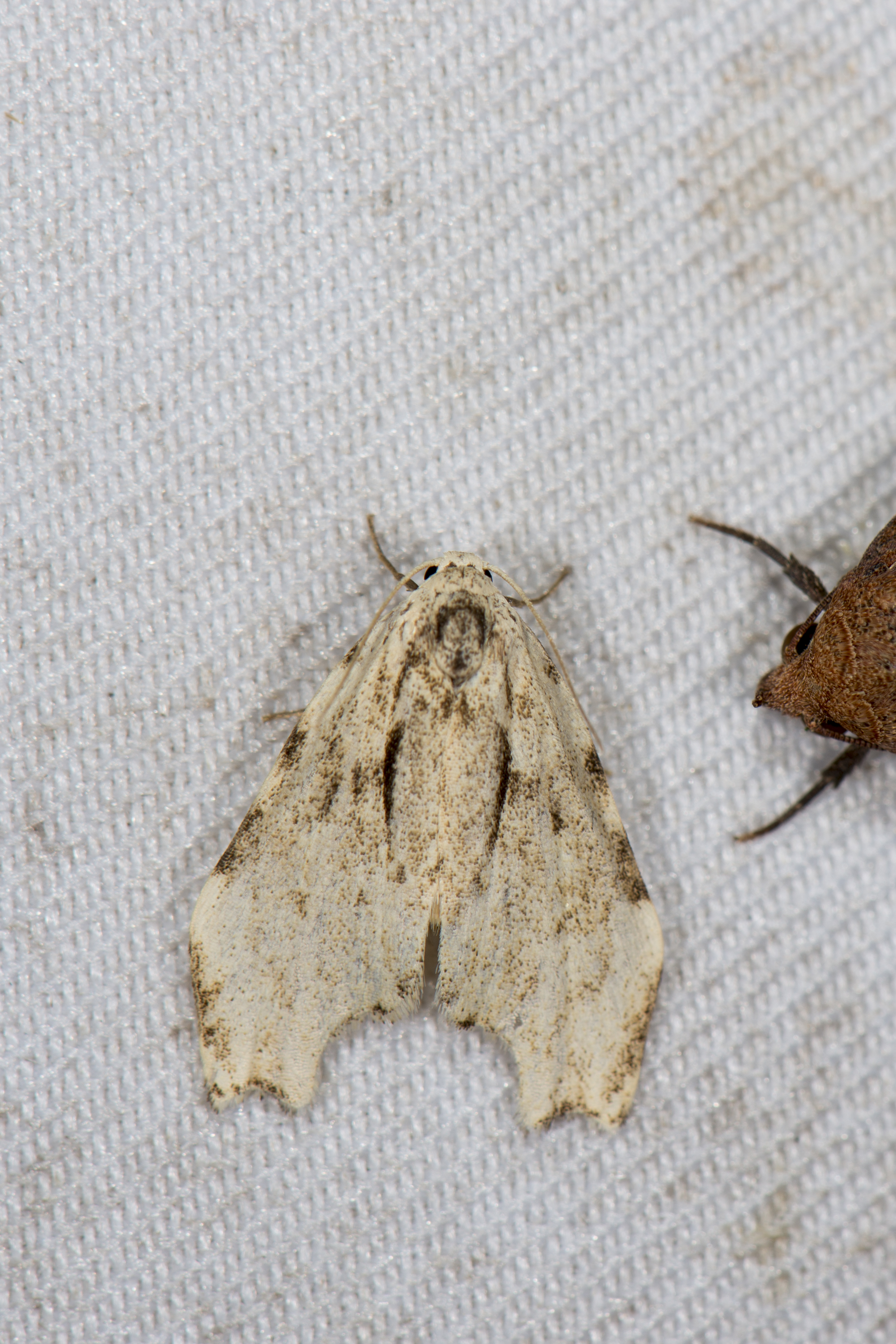
- Tortricosia genus of moth

Scientific classification
- Kingdom: Animalia
- Phylum: Arthropoda
- Class: Insecta
- Order: Lepidoptera
- Superfamily: Noctuoidea
- Family: Erebidae
- Subfamily: Arctiinae
- Subtribe: Cisthenina
- Genus: Tortricosia; Hampson, 1900

Synonyms
- Mellona van Eecke, 1926

= Tortricosia =

Genus of moths

Tortricosia is a genus of moths in the subfamily Arctiinae.

== Species ==
- Tortricosia blanda (van Eecke, 1927)
- Tortricosia classeyi Holloway, 2001
- Tortricosia excisa Hampson, 1900
- Tortricosia pallidexcisa Holloway, 2001
