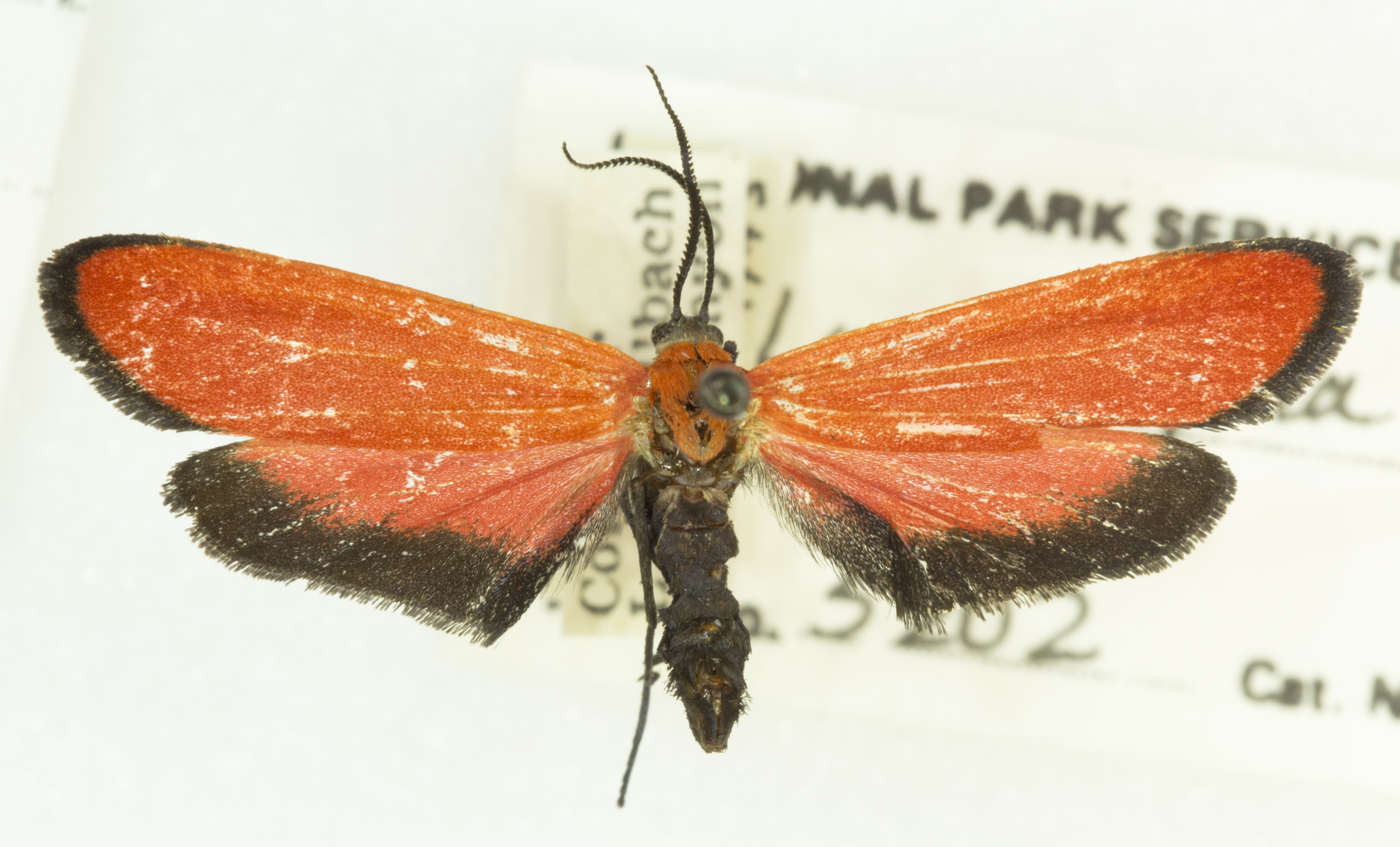

Scientific classification
- Kingdom: Animalia
- Phylum: Arthropoda
- Clade: Pancrustacea
- Class: Insecta
- Order: Lepidoptera
- Superfamily: Noctuoidea
- Family: Erebidae
- Subfamily: Arctiinae
- Genus: Lycomorpha
- Species: L. grotei

Binomial name
- Lycomorpha grotei (Packard, 1864)

Synonyms
- Anatolmis grotei Packard, 1864; Lycomorpha palmerii Packard, 1872; Lycomorpha pulchra Dyar, 1898

= Lycomorpha grotei =

Species of moth

Lycomorpha grotei, or Grote's lycomorpha moth, is a moth of the family Erebidae. It was described by Alpheus Spring Packard in 1864. It is found in North America, including Arizona, California, Colorado, Montana, Nevada, South Dakota, Texas, Utah and Wyoming.

The length of the forewings is 13–15 mm (0.51–0.59 in). Adults are on wing from June to August in one generation per year.

== Subspecies ==
- Lycomorpha grotei grotei
- Lycomorpha grotei pulchra Dyar, 1898
