= Meteugoa =

Scientific classification
- Kingdom: Animalia
- Phylum: Arthropoda
- Class: Insecta
- Order: Lepidoptera
- Superfamily: Noctuoidea
- Family: Erebidae
- Subfamily: Arctiinae
- Subtribe: Cisthenina
- Genus: Meteugoa; Hampson, 1900

Genus of moths

Meteugoa is a genus of moths in the family Erebidae erected by George Hampson in 1900.

== Species ==
- Meteugoa fasciosa Rothschild & Jordan, 1901
- Meteugoa melanoleuca Hampson, 1901
- Meteugoa obliquiata Hampson, 1900
- Meteugoa ochrivena Hampson, 1898
- Meteugoa venochrea van Eecke, 1920
