= Rhabdatomis knabi =

Scientific classification
- Kingdom: Animalia
- Phylum: Arthropoda
- Class: Insecta
- Order: Lepidoptera
- Superfamily: Noctuoidea
- Family: Erebidae
- Subfamily: Arctiinae
- Genus: Rhabdatomis
- Species: R. knabi

Binomial name
- Rhabdatomis knabi Field, 1964

Species of moth

Rhabdatomis knabi is a moth in the subfamily Arctiinae. It was described by William D. Field in 1964. It is found in Mexico.
