= Ptychoglene aequalis =

Scientific classification
- Kingdom: Animalia
- Phylum: Arthropoda
- Class: Insecta
- Order: Lepidoptera
- Superfamily: Noctuoidea
- Family: Erebidae
- Subfamily: Arctiinae
- Genus: Ptychoglene
- Species: P. aequalis

Binomial name
- Ptychoglene aequalis (Walker, 1854)

Synonyms
- Lithosia aequalis Walker, 1854

Species of moth

Ptychoglene aequalis is a moth in the subfamily Arctiinae. It was described by Francis Walker in 1854. It is found in Guatemala.
