= Cyclosiella dulcicula =

Scientific classification
- Domain: Eukaryota
- Kingdom: Animalia
- Phylum: Arthropoda
- Class: Insecta
- Order: Lepidoptera
- Superfamily: Noctuoidea
- Family: Erebidae
- Subfamily: Arctiinae
- Genus: Cyclosiella
- Species: C. dulcicula

Binomial name
- Cyclosiella dulcicula (C. Swinhoe, 1890)

Synonyms
- Hemonia dulcicula C. Swinhoe, 1890

Species of moth

Cyclosiella dulcicula is a moth of the family Erebidae first described by Charles Swinhoe in 1890. It is found in southern India, the northeast Indian state of Assam, Sri Lanka and Myanmar.

== Description ==
In the female, the head and prothorax are orange. The mesothorax, metathorax and forewings are purplish grey. A broad orange band runs from the base along the costal and outer areas with a dark line, on which few scales can be found that defining two colours. Hindwings pale fuscous with ochreous margins and cilia.
