= Propyria schausi =

Scientific classification
- Kingdom: Animalia
- Phylum: Arthropoda
- Class: Insecta
- Order: Lepidoptera
- Superfamily: Noctuoidea
- Family: Erebidae
- Subfamily: Arctiinae
- Genus: Propyria
- Species: P. schausi

Binomial name
- Propyria schausi (Dyar, 1898)

Synonyms
- Lycomorpha schausi Dyar, 1898; Lycomorpha fulgens Neumoegen & Dyar, 1893

Species of moth

Propyria schausi is a moth in the subfamily Arctiinae. It was described by Harrison Gray Dyar Jr. in 1898. It is found in northern Mexico and the US state of Arizona.
