= Haematomis =

Scientific classification
- Kingdom: Animalia
- Phylum: Arthropoda
- Class: Insecta
- Order: Lepidoptera
- Superfamily: Noctuoidea
- Family: Erebidae
- Subfamily: Arctiinae
- Subtribe: Cisthenina
- Genus: Haematomis; Hampson, 1900

Genus of moths

Haematomis is a genus of moths in the family Erebidae erected by George Hampson in 1900.

== Species ==
- Haematomis mexicana (H. Druce, 1885)
- Haematomis radians Dyar, 1907
- Haematomis uniformis Schaus, 1899
