= Oxacme umbrodorsum =

Scientific classification
- Kingdom: Animalia
- Phylum: Arthropoda
- Clade: Pancrustacea
- Class: Insecta
- Order: Lepidoptera
- Superfamily: Noctuoidea
- Family: Erebidae
- Subfamily: Arctiinae
- Genus: Oxacme
- Species: O. umbrodorsum

Binomial name
- Oxacme umbrodorsum Holloway, 2001

Species of moth

Oxacme umbrodorsum is a moth in the subfamily Arctiinae. It was described by Jeremy Daniel Holloway in 2001. It is found on Borneo and Peninsular Malaysia. The habitat consists of lower montane forests and lowland forests.

The length of the forewings is 8–9 mm for both males and females.
