= Utriculofera muricolor =

Scientific classification
- Kingdom: Animalia
- Phylum: Arthropoda
- Class: Insecta
- Order: Lepidoptera
- Superfamily: Noctuoidea
- Family: Erebidae
- Subfamily: Arctiinae
- Genus: Utriculofera
- Species: U. muricolor

Binomial name
- Utriculofera muricolor Rothschild, 1913

Species of moth

Utriculofera muricolor is a moth in the subfamily Arctiinae. It was described by Rothschild in 1913.
