= Padenia cupreifascia =

Scientific classification
- Kingdom: Animalia
- Phylum: Arthropoda
- Class: Insecta
- Order: Lepidoptera
- Superfamily: Noctuoidea
- Family: Erebidae
- Subfamily: Arctiinae
- Genus: Padenia
- Species: P. cupreifascia

Binomial name
- Padenia cupreifascia (Rothschild, 1912)

Synonyms
- Garudinia cupreifascia Rothschild, 1912

Species of moth

Padenia cupreifascia is a moth of the subfamily Arctiinae. It was described by Rothschild in 1912. It is found on Sumbawa.
