= Utriculofera fuscapex =

Scientific classification
- Kingdom: Animalia
- Phylum: Arthropoda
- Class: Insecta
- Order: Lepidoptera
- Superfamily: Noctuoidea
- Family: Erebidae
- Subfamily: Arctiinae
- Genus: Utriculofera
- Species: U. fuscapex

Binomial name
- Utriculofera fuscapex Hampson, 1893

Species of moth

Utriculofera fuscapex is a moth in the subfamily Arctiinae. It was described by George Hampson in 1893. It is found in Sri Lanka and India, as well as on Borneo. The habitat consists of lowland forests.

== Description ==
Its wingspan is 16 mm. The body is brownish grey. Forewings are pale white with dark parts in costa, and inner base is brownish. Two dark specks runs beyond the cell. Apex suffused with fuscous. The body's general shape has been described as being similar to that of Tortricosia excisa, though that species is larger.
