= Garudinia conjuncta =

Scientific classification
- Domain: Eukaryota
- Kingdom: Animalia
- Phylum: Arthropoda
- Class: Insecta
- Order: Lepidoptera
- Superfamily: Noctuoidea
- Family: Erebidae
- Subfamily: Arctiinae
- Genus: Garudinia
- Species: G. conjuncta

Binomial name
- Garudinia conjuncta Kirti & Gill, 2009

Species of moth

Garudinia conjuncta is a moth of the family Erebidae. It was described by Jagbir Singh Kirti and Navneet Singh Gill in 2009. It is found in Karnataka, India.
