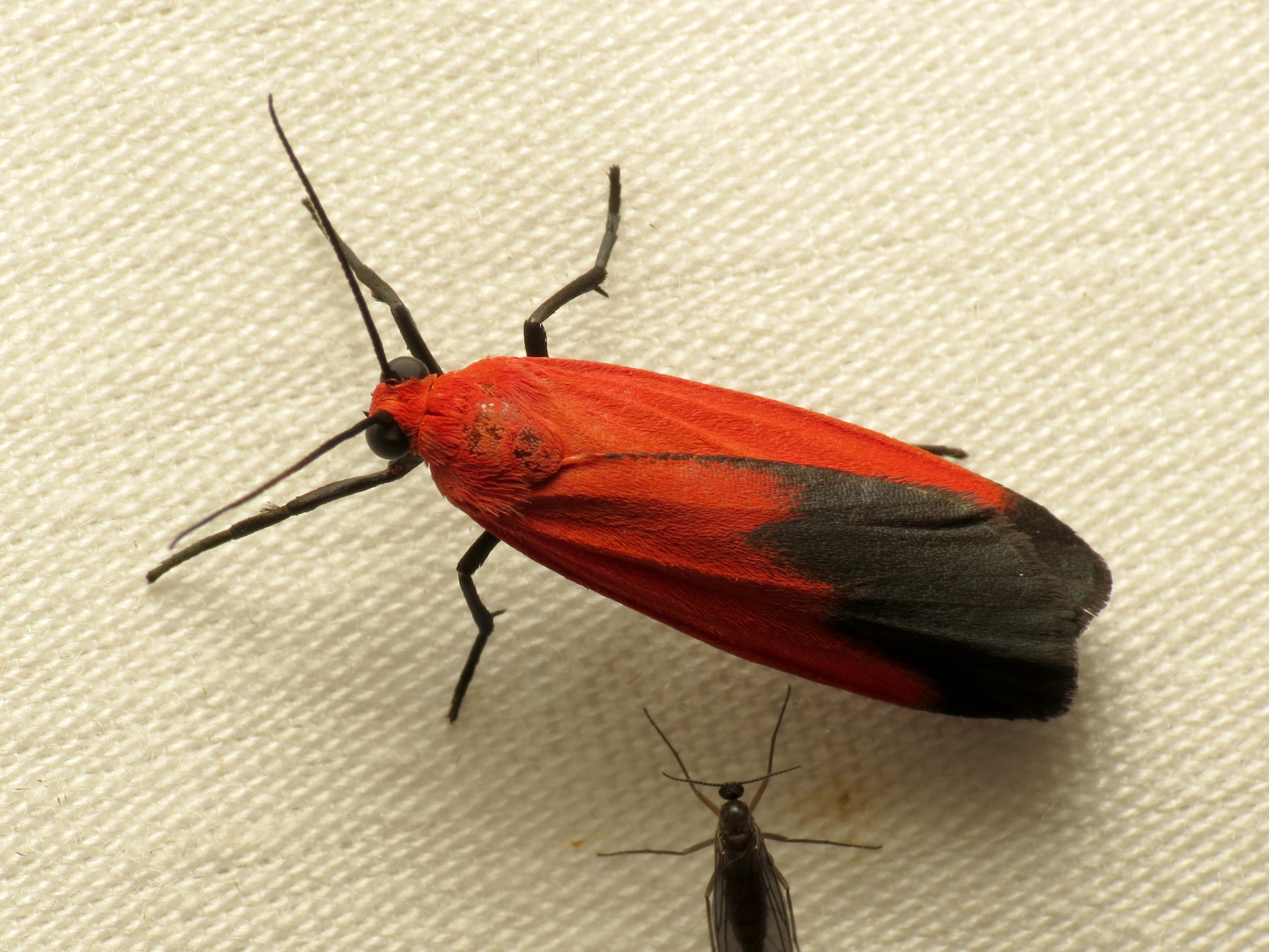
- Ptychoglene sp.

Scientific classification
- Domain: Eukaryota
- Kingdom: Animalia
- Phylum: Arthropoda
- Class: Insecta
- Order: Lepidoptera
- Superfamily: Noctuoidea
- Family: Erebidae
- Subfamily: Arctiinae
- Tribe: Lithosiini
- Subtribe: Cisthenina
- Genus: Ptychoglene; Felder, 1874

= Ptychoglene =

Genus of moths

Ptychoglene is a genus of moths in the subfamily Arctiinae. The genus was erected by Felder in 1874.

== Species ==
- Ptychoglene aequalis (Walker, 1854)
- Ptychoglene coccinea (H. Edwards, 1886)
- Ptychoglene erythrophora Felder, 1874
- Ptychoglene pertunda Druce, 1889
- Ptychoglene phrada Druce, 1889
- Ptychoglene rubromarginata Druce, 1885
- Ptychoglene sanguineola (Boisduval, 1870)
- Ptychoglene xylophila Druce, 1885
