= Rhabdatomis mandana =

Scientific classification
- Kingdom: Animalia
- Phylum: Arthropoda
- Class: Insecta
- Order: Lepidoptera
- Superfamily: Noctuoidea
- Family: Erebidae
- Subfamily: Arctiinae
- Genus: Rhabdatomis
- Species: R. mandana

Binomial name
- Rhabdatomis mandana (Dyar, 1907)

Synonyms
- Diarhabdosia mandana Dyar, 1907

Species of moth

Rhabdatomis mandana is a moth in the subfamily Arctiinae. It was described by Harrison Gray Dyar Jr. in 1907. It is found in Brazil.
