= Propyria ptychoglene =

Scientific classification
- Kingdom: Animalia
- Phylum: Arthropoda
- Class: Insecta
- Order: Lepidoptera
- Superfamily: Noctuoidea
- Family: Erebidae
- Subfamily: Arctiinae
- Genus: Propyria
- Species: P. ptychoglene

Binomial name
- Propyria ptychoglene Hampson, 1898

Species of moth

Propyria ptychoglene is a moth in the subfamily Arctiinae. It was described by George Hampson in 1898. It is found in Mexico and Guatemala.
