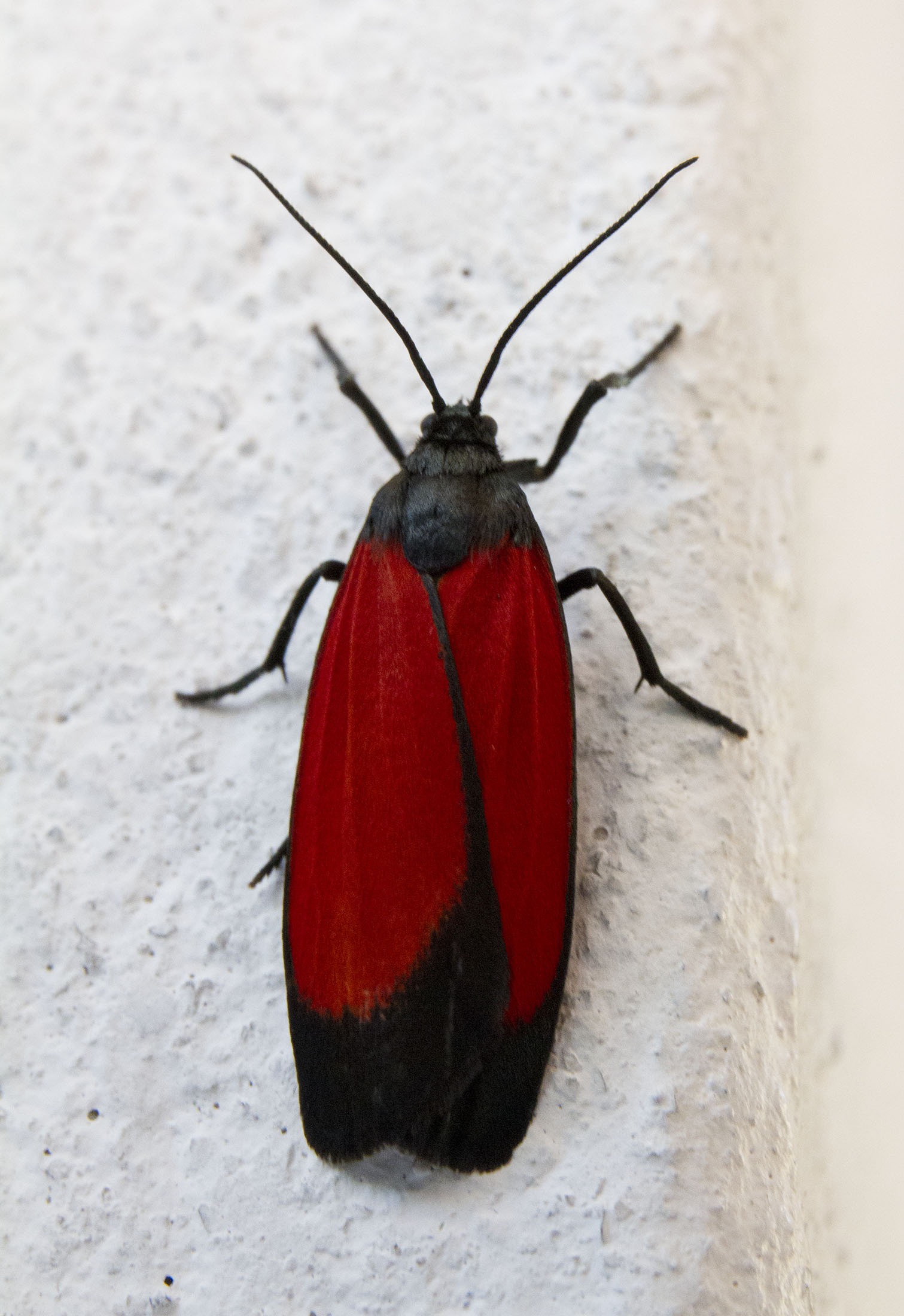

Scientific classification
- Domain: Eukaryota
- Kingdom: Animalia
- Phylum: Arthropoda
- Class: Insecta
- Order: Lepidoptera
- Superfamily: Noctuoidea
- Family: Erebidae
- Subfamily: Arctiinae
- Genus: Ptychoglene
- Species: P. sanguineola

Binomial name
- Ptychoglene sanguineola (Boisduval, 1870)

Synonyms
- Lithosia sanguineola Boisduval, 1870

= Ptychoglene sanguineola =

Species of moth

Ptychoglene sanguineola is a moth in the subfamily Arctiinae. It was described by Jean Baptiste Boisduval in 1870. It is found in Arizona, Mexico and Guatemala.
