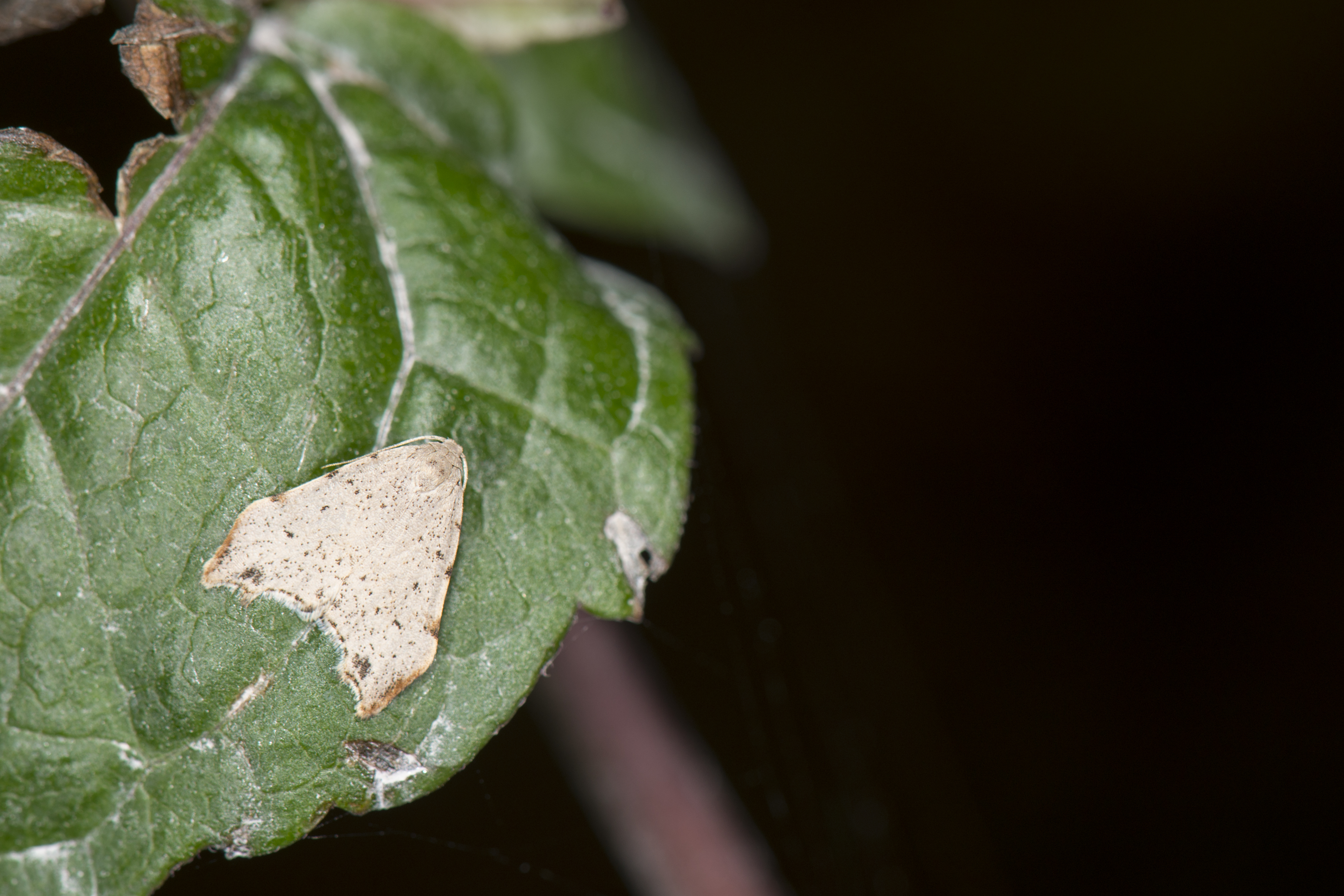

Scientific classification
- Kingdom: Animalia
- Phylum: Arthropoda
- Class: Insecta
- Order: Lepidoptera
- Superfamily: Noctuoidea
- Family: Erebidae
- Subfamily: Arctiinae
- Genus: Oxacme
- Species: O. cretacea

Binomial name
- Oxacme cretacea (Hampson, 1914)

Synonyms
- Macaduma cretacea Hampson, 1914

= Oxacme cretacea =

Species of moth

Oxacme cretacea is a moth in the subfamily Arctiinae. It was described by George Hampson in 1914. It is found in Taiwan.
