= Byrsia amoena =

Scientific classification
- Kingdom: Animalia
- Phylum: Arthropoda
- Class: Insecta
- Order: Lepidoptera
- Superfamily: Noctuoidea
- Family: Erebidae
- Subfamily: Arctiinae
- Genus: Byrsia
- Species: B. amoena

Binomial name
- Byrsia amoena Rothschild & Jordan, 1901

Synonyms
- Byrsia guizonis Jordan, 1904

Species of moth

Byrsia amoena is a moth of the family Erebidae. It is found on the Solomon Islands.
