= Padenia transversa =

Scientific classification
- Kingdom: Animalia
- Phylum: Arthropoda
- Class: Insecta
- Order: Lepidoptera
- Superfamily: Noctuoidea
- Family: Erebidae
- Subfamily: Arctiinae
- Genus: Padenia
- Species: P. transversa

Binomial name
- Padenia transversa (Walker, 1854)

Synonyms
- Cyllene transversa Walker, 1854; Lithosia bifasciata Felder, 1874

Species of moth

Padenia transversa is a moth of the subfamily Arctiinae. It was described by Francis Walker in 1854. It is found in Sri Lanka and on the Andamans.

== Description ==
The head, thorax and abdomen are yellowish white suffused with fuscous. Forewings are yellowish white. Antemedial and postmedials are slightly angled fuscous bands. Hindwings are yellowish white with a slight fuscous tinge.
