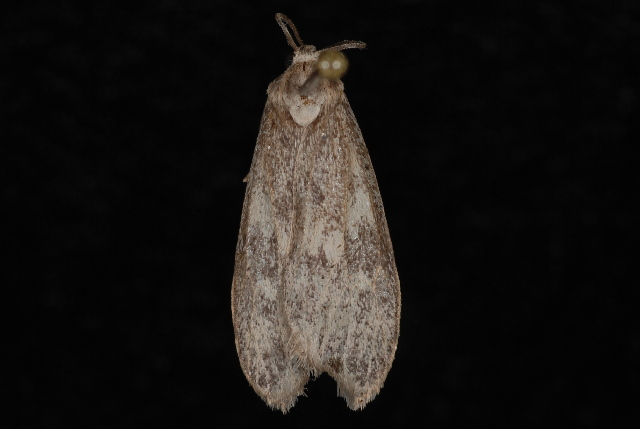
- Bruceia pulverina

Scientific classification
- Domain: Eukaryota
- Kingdom: Animalia
- Phylum: Arthropoda
- Class: Insecta
- Order: Lepidoptera
- Superfamily: Noctuoidea
- Family: Erebidae
- Subfamily: Arctiinae
- Subtribe: Cisthenina
- Genus: Bruceia; Neumoegen, 1893

= Bruceia =

Genus of moths

Bruceia is a genus of moths in the family Erebidae.

== Species ==
- Bruceia hubbardi Dyar, 1898
- Bruceia pulverina Neumögen, 1893
