= Cyclosiella spiralis =

Scientific classification
- Domain: Eukaryota
- Kingdom: Animalia
- Phylum: Arthropoda
- Class: Insecta
- Order: Lepidoptera
- Superfamily: Noctuoidea
- Family: Erebidae
- Subfamily: Arctiinae
- Genus: Cyclosiella
- Species: C. spiralis

Binomial name
- Cyclosiella spiralis (van Eecke, 1926)

Synonyms
- Trischalis spiralis van Eecke, 1926

Species of moth

Cyclosiella spiralis is a moth of the family Erebidae first described by van Eecke in 1926. It is found on Sumatra, Borneo and Peninsular Malaysia. The habitat consists of lowland localities, including dry heath forests, swamp forests and secondary coastal forests.
