= Garudinia triangulata =

Scientific classification
- Kingdom: Animalia
- Phylum: Arthropoda
- Clade: Pancrustacea
- Class: Insecta
- Order: Lepidoptera
- Superfamily: Noctuoidea
- Family: Erebidae
- Subfamily: Arctiinae
- Genus: Garudinia
- Species: G. triangulata

Binomial name
- Garudinia triangulata Holloway, 2001

Species of moth

Garudinia triangulata is a moth of the family Erebidae first described by Jeremy Daniel Holloway in 2001. It is found on Borneo. The habitat consists of lowland dipterocarp forests and from lower montane forests.

The wingspan is 9–10 mm.
