= Meteugoa obliquiata =

Scientific classification
- Kingdom: Animalia
- Phylum: Arthropoda
- Class: Insecta
- Order: Lepidoptera
- Superfamily: Noctuoidea
- Family: Erebidae
- Subfamily: Arctiinae
- Genus: Meteugoa
- Species: M. obliquiata

Binomial name
- Meteugoa obliquiata Hampson, 1900

Species of moth

Meteugoa obliquiata is a moth of the family Erebidae. It was described by George Hampson in 1900. It is found in Singapore and on Peninsular Malaysia, Borneo and Java. The habitat consists of dipterocarp forests, lowland forests and coastal mangroves.

Larvae have been recorded feeding on Hevea, but were possibly browsing on lower plants or lichens on the trunk of this tree.
