= Cyclosiella =

Scientific classification
- Kingdom: Animalia
- Phylum: Arthropoda
- Class: Insecta
- Order: Lepidoptera
- Superfamily: Noctuoidea
- Family: Erebidae
- Subfamily: Arctiinae
- Subtribe: Cisthenina
- Genus: Cyclosiella; Hampson, 1900

Genus of moths

Cyclosiella is a genus of moths in the family Erebidae. The genus was erected by George Hampson in 1900.

== Species ==
- Cyclosiella dulcicula (Swinhoe, 1890)
- Cyclosiella dulciculoides Holloway, 2001
- Cyclosiella spiralis (van Eecke, 1926)
