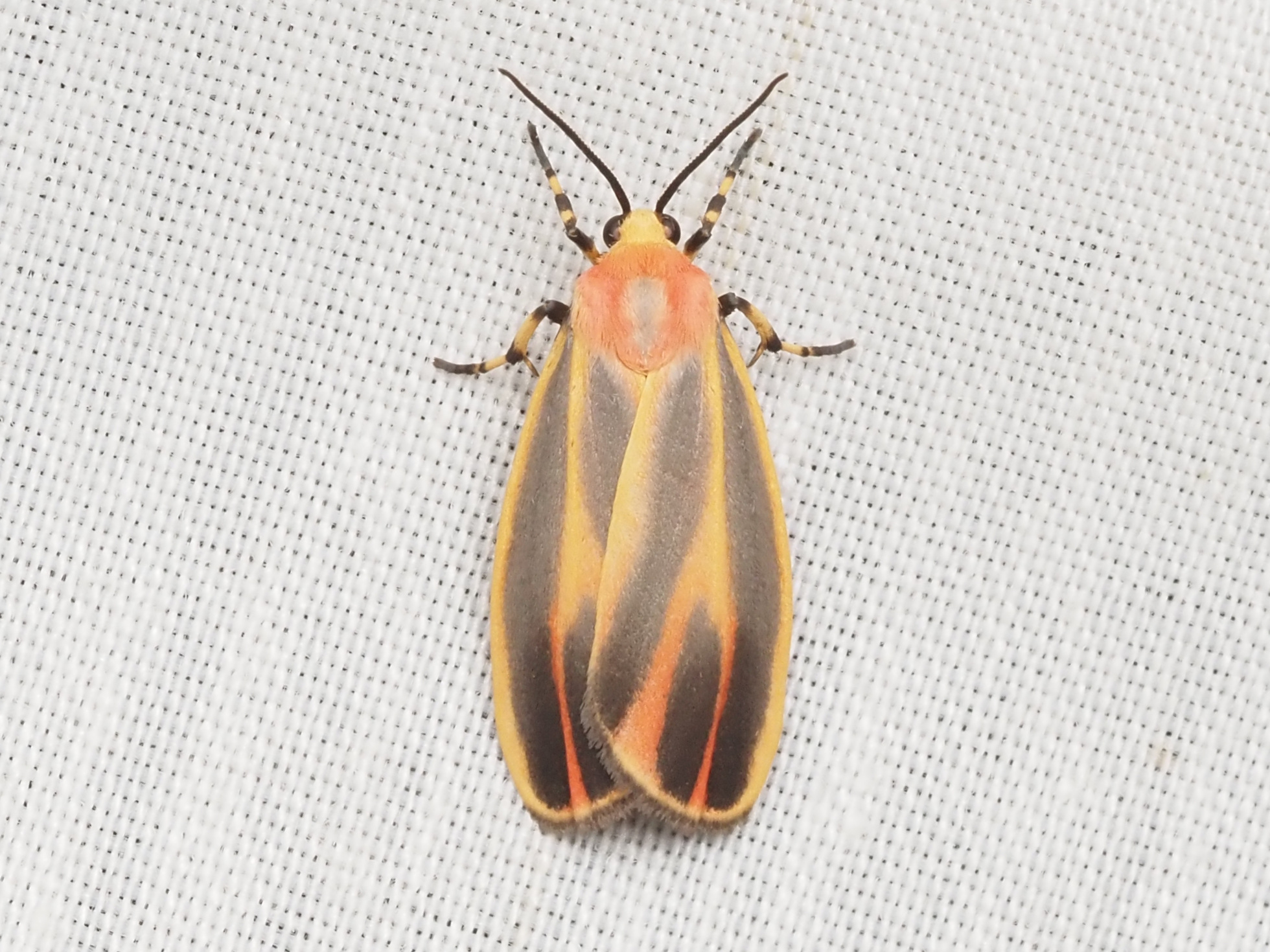

Scientific classification
- Kingdom: Animalia
- Phylum: Arthropoda
- Clade: Pancrustacea
- Class: Insecta
- Order: Lepidoptera
- Superfamily: Noctuoidea
- Family: Erebidae
- Subfamily: Arctiinae
- Genus: Hypoprepia
- Species: H. fucosa

Binomial name
- Hypoprepia fucosa Hübner, [1831]

Synonyms
- Hypoprepia subornata Neumoegen & Dyar, 1893; Hypoprepia inornata Ottlengui; Atolmis tricolor Fitch, 1857; Hypoprepia plumbea H. Edwards, 1886

= Hypoprepia fucosa =

Painted lichen moth

Species of moth

Hypoprepia fucosa, the painted lichen moth, is a moth of the family Erebidae. The species was first described by Jacob Hübner in 1831. It is found in the United States and southern Canada east of the Rocky Mountains.

The wingspan is 25–35 mm. Adults are on wing from May to August in the north and possibly most of the year in Florida.

The larvae feed on lichen, algae and moss on trees.

== Subspecies ==
- Hypoprepia fucosa subornata
- Hypoprepia fucosa tricolor
