= Ptychoglene erythrophora =

Scientific classification
- Domain: Eukaryota
- Kingdom: Animalia
- Phylum: Arthropoda
- Class: Insecta
- Order: Lepidoptera
- Superfamily: Noctuoidea
- Family: Erebidae
- Subfamily: Arctiinae
- Genus: Ptychoglene
- Species: P. erythrophora

Binomial name
- Ptychoglene erythrophora Felder, 1874

Species of moth

Ptychoglene erythrophora is a moth in the subfamily Arctiinae. It was described by Felder in 1874. It is found in Mexico.
