= Rhabdatomis pueblae =

Scientific classification
- Kingdom: Animalia
- Phylum: Arthropoda
- Class: Insecta
- Order: Lepidoptera
- Superfamily: Noctuoidea
- Family: Erebidae
- Subfamily: Arctiinae
- Genus: Rhabdatomis
- Species: R. pueblae

Binomial name
- Rhabdatomis pueblae (Draudt, 1919)

Synonyms
- Diarhabdosia pueblae Draudt, 1919

Species of moth

Rhabdatomis pueblae is a moth in the subfamily Arctiinae. It was described by Max Wilhelm Karl Draudt in 1919. It is found in Mexico.
