= Meteugoa venochrea =

Scientific classification
- Kingdom: Animalia
- Phylum: Arthropoda
- Class: Insecta
- Order: Lepidoptera
- Superfamily: Noctuoidea
- Family: Erebidae
- Subfamily: Arctiinae
- Genus: Meteugoa
- Species: M. venochrea

Binomial name
- Meteugoa venochrea van Eecke, 1920

Species of moth

Meteugoa venochrea is a moth of the family Erebidae. It was described by van Eecke in 1920. It is found on Java.
