= Garudinia pseudolatana =

Scientific classification
- Kingdom: Animalia
- Phylum: Arthropoda
- Clade: Pancrustacea
- Class: Insecta
- Order: Lepidoptera
- Superfamily: Noctuoidea
- Family: Erebidae
- Subfamily: Arctiinae
- Genus: Garudinia
- Species: G. pseudolatana

Binomial name
- Garudinia pseudolatana Holloway, 2001

Species of moth

Garudinia pseudolatana is a moth of the family Erebidae first described by Jeremy Daniel Holloway in 2001. It is found on Borneo. The habitat consists of lowland forests.

The wingspan is about 6–7 mm.
