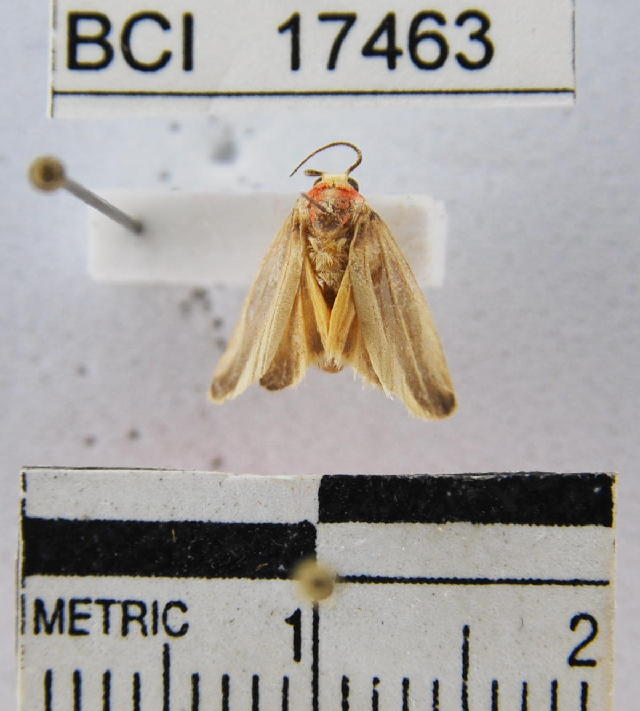
- Rhabdatomis cora

Scientific classification
- Kingdom: Animalia
- Phylum: Arthropoda
- Class: Insecta
- Order: Lepidoptera
- Superfamily: Noctuoidea
- Family: Erebidae
- Subfamily: Arctiinae
- Tribe: Lithosiini
- Subtribe: Cisthenina
- Genus: Rhabdatomis; Dyar, 1907

= Rhabdatomis =

Genus of moths

Rhabdatomis is a genus of moths in the subfamily Arctiinae. The genus was erected by Harrison Gray Dyar Jr. in 1907.

== Species ==
- Rhabdatomis cora (Dyar, 1907)
- Rhabdatomis dognini Field, 1964
- Rhabdatomis draudti Field, 1964
- Rhabdatomis extensa Field, 1964
- Rhabdatomis fasseli Field, 1964
- Rhabdatomis knabi Field, 1964
- Rhabdatomis laudamia (H. Druce, 1885)
- Rhabdatomis mandana (Dyar, 1907)
- Rhabdatomis melinda (Schaus, 1911)
- Rhabdatomis pueblae (Draudt, 1919)
- Rhabdatomis zaba Dyar, 1907
