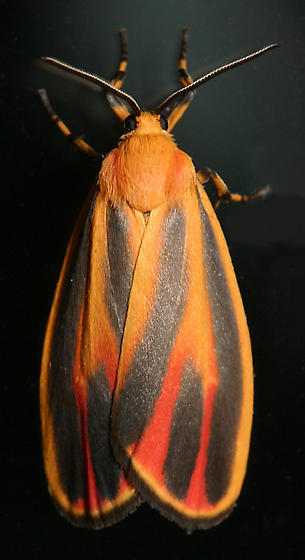
- Hypoprepia fucosa

Scientific classification
- Kingdom: Animalia
- Phylum: Arthropoda
- Clade: Pancrustacea
- Class: Insecta
- Order: Lepidoptera
- Superfamily: Noctuoidea
- Family: Erebidae
- Subfamily: Arctiinae
- Subtribe: Cisthenina
- Genus: Hypoprepia; Hübner, [1831]

= Hypoprepia =

Genus of moths

Hypoprepia is a genus of moths in the family Erebidae. The genus was erected by Jacob Hübner in 1831.

== Species ==
- Hypoprepia miniata (Kirby, 1837)
- Hypoprepia fucosa Hübner, [1831]
- Hypoprepia cadaverosa Strecker, 1878
- Hypoprepia inculta H. Edwards, 1882
