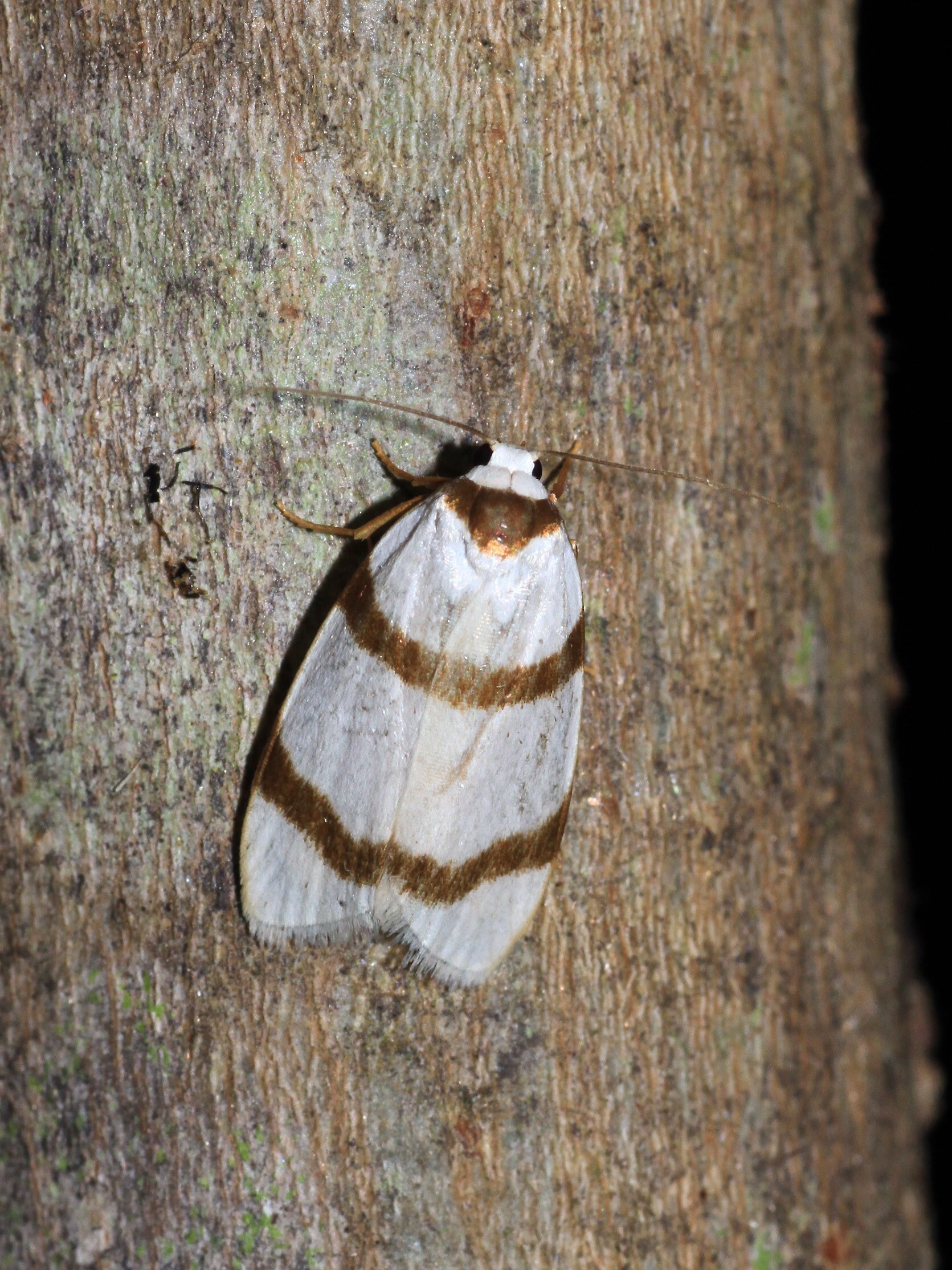

Scientific classification
- Kingdom: Animalia
- Phylum: Arthropoda
- Class: Insecta
- Order: Lepidoptera
- Superfamily: Noctuoidea
- Family: Erebidae
- Subfamily: Arctiinae
- Genus: Padenia
- Species: P. obliquifascia

Binomial name
- Padenia obliquifascia Rothschild, 1920

= Padenia obliquifascia =

Species of moth

Padenia obliquifascia is a moth of the subfamily Arctiinae. It was described by Rothschild in 1920. It is found on Sumatra, Java and Borneo.
