= Ptychoglene phrada =

Scientific classification
- Domain: Eukaryota
- Kingdom: Animalia
- Phylum: Arthropoda
- Class: Insecta
- Order: Lepidoptera
- Superfamily: Noctuoidea
- Family: Erebidae
- Subfamily: Arctiinae
- Genus: Ptychoglene
- Species: P. phrada

Binomial name
- Ptychoglene phrada H. Druce, 1889

Synonyms
- Ptychoglene flammans Dyar, 1898

Species of moth

Ptychoglene phrada is a moth in the subfamily Arctiinae. It was described by Herbert Druce in 1889. It is found in Arizona and Mexico.
