= Padenia duplicana =

Scientific classification
- Kingdom: Animalia
- Phylum: Arthropoda
- Class: Insecta
- Order: Lepidoptera
- Superfamily: Noctuoidea
- Family: Erebidae
- Subfamily: Arctiinae
- Genus: Padenia
- Species: P. duplicana

Binomial name
- Padenia duplicana (Walker, 1863)

Synonyms
- Tospitis duplicana Walker, 1863; Garudinia bifasciata Rothschild, 1912; Garudinia bizonata Rothschild, 1912

Species of moth

Padenia duplicana is a moth of the subfamily Arctiinae. It was described by Francis Walker in 1863. It is found in Myanmar and on Borneo, Sumatra, Java and the Philippines. The habitat consists of various lowland forest types.
