= Padenia acutifascia =

Scientific classification
- Kingdom: Animalia
- Phylum: Arthropoda
- Class: Insecta
- Order: Lepidoptera
- Superfamily: Noctuoidea
- Family: Erebidae
- Subfamily: Arctiinae
- Genus: Padenia
- Species: P. acutifascia

Binomial name
- Padenia acutifascia de Joannis, 1928

Species of moth

Padenia acutifascia is a moth of the subfamily Arctiinae described by Joseph de Joannis in 1928. It is found in Vietnam.
