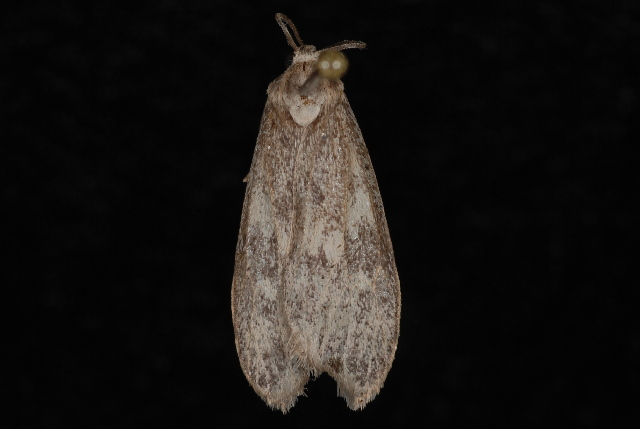

Scientific classification
- Kingdom: Animalia
- Phylum: Arthropoda
- Class: Insecta
- Order: Lepidoptera
- Superfamily: Noctuoidea
- Family: Erebidae
- Subfamily: Arctiinae
- Genus: Bruceia
- Species: B. pulverina

Binomial name
- Bruceia pulverina Neumögen, 1893

= Bruceia pulverina =

Species of moth

Bruceia pulverina is a moth of the family Erebidae. It was described by Berthold Neumögen in 1893.
