= Propyria =

Scientific classification
- Kingdom: Animalia
- Phylum: Arthropoda
- Class: Insecta
- Order: Lepidoptera
- Superfamily: Noctuoidea
- Family: Erebidae
- Subfamily: Arctiinae
- Subtribe: Cisthenina
- Genus: Propyria; Hampson, 1898

Genus of moths

Propyria is a genus of moths in the subfamily Arctiinae. The genus was erected by George Hampson in 1898.

== Species ==
- Propyria schausi (Dyar, 1898)
- Propyria ptychoglene Hampson, 1898
- Propyria criton (Druce, 1885)
