= Garudinistis =

Scientific classification
- Kingdom: Animalia
- Phylum: Arthropoda
- Class: Insecta
- Order: Lepidoptera
- Superfamily: Noctuoidea
- Family: Erebidae
- Subfamily: Arctiinae
- Subtribe: Cisthenina
- Genus: Garudinistis; Hampson, 1900

Genus of moths

Garudinistis is a genus of moths in the family Erebidae erected by George Hampson in 1900.

== Species ==
- Garudinistis eburneana Walker, 1863

== Formerly placed here ==
- Garudinistis variegata Rothschild, 1912
