= Garudinia pseudosimulana =

Scientific classification
- Domain: Eukaryota
- Kingdom: Animalia
- Phylum: Arthropoda
- Class: Insecta
- Order: Lepidoptera
- Superfamily: Noctuoidea
- Family: Erebidae
- Subfamily: Arctiinae
- Genus: Garudinia
- Species: G. pseudosimulana

Binomial name
- Garudinia pseudosimulana Kirti & Gill, 2009

Species of moth

Garudinia pseudosimulana is a moth of the family Erebidae. It was described by Jagbir Singh Kirti and Navneet Singh Gill in 2008. It is found in Karnataka, India.
