= Oxacme asymmetrica =

Scientific classification
- Kingdom: Animalia
- Phylum: Arthropoda
- Clade: Pancrustacea
- Class: Insecta
- Order: Lepidoptera
- Superfamily: Noctuoidea
- Family: Erebidae
- Subfamily: Arctiinae
- Genus: Oxacme
- Species: O. asymmetrica

Binomial name
- Oxacme asymmetrica Holloway, 2001

Species of moth

Oxacme asymmetrica is a moth in the subfamily Arctiinae. It was described by Jeremy Daniel Holloway in 2001. It is found on Borneo. The habitat consists lowland dipterocarp forests, including alluvial forests.

The length of the forewings is about 7 mm.
