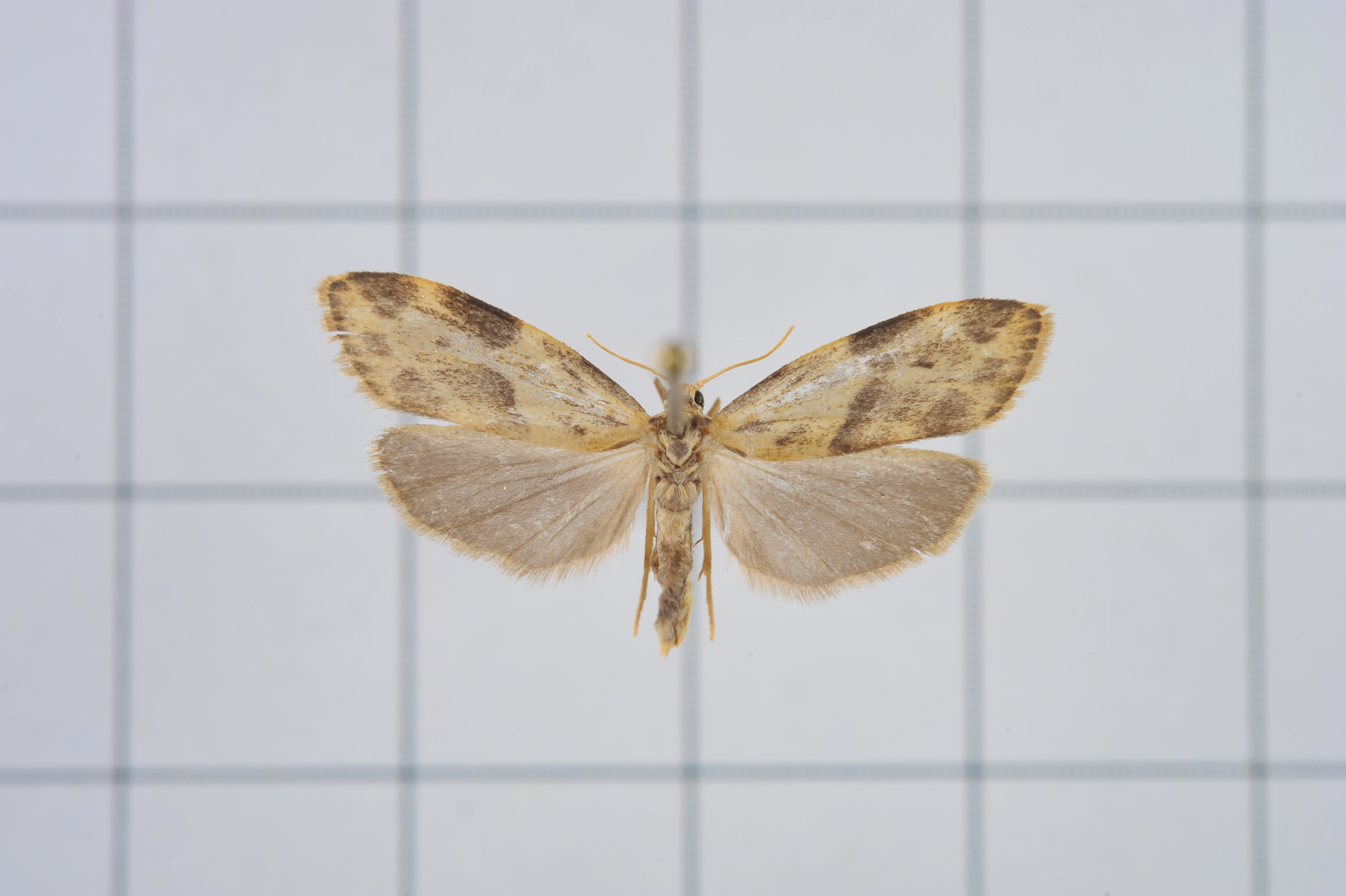

Scientific classification
- Kingdom: Animalia
- Phylum: Arthropoda
- Clade: Pancrustacea
- Class: Insecta
- Order: Lepidoptera
- Superfamily: Noctuoidea
- Family: Erebidae
- Subfamily: Arctiinae
- Genus: Meteugoa
- Species: M. ochrivena

Binomial name
- Meteugoa ochrivena (Hampson, 1898)

Synonyms
- Eugoa ochrivena Hampson, 1898; Meteugoa japonica Strand, 1917

= Meteugoa ochrivena =

Species of moth

Meteugoa ochrivena is a moth of the family Erebidae. It was described by George Hampson in 1898. It is found in the north-eastern Himalayas, Taiwan and on Borneo and Bali. The habitat consists of lower montane forests, hill dipterocarp forests and lowland forests.
