= Utriculofera macroplaga =

Scientific classification
- Kingdom: Animalia
- Phylum: Arthropoda
- Class: Insecta
- Order: Lepidoptera
- Superfamily: Noctuoidea
- Family: Erebidae
- Subfamily: Arctiinae
- Genus: Utriculofera
- Species: U. macroplaga

Binomial name
- Utriculofera macroplaga Hampson, 1900

Synonyms
- Utriculifera macroplaga Hampson, 1900

Species of moth

Utriculofera macroplaga is a moth in the subfamily Arctiinae. It was described by George Hampson in 1900. It is found on Borneo.
