= Ptychoglene xylophila =

Scientific classification
- Domain: Eukaryota
- Kingdom: Animalia
- Phylum: Arthropoda
- Class: Insecta
- Order: Lepidoptera
- Superfamily: Noctuoidea
- Family: Erebidae
- Subfamily: Arctiinae
- Genus: Ptychoglene
- Species: P. xylophila

Binomial name
- Ptychoglene xylophila H. Druce, 1885

Species of moth

Ptychoglene xylophila is a moth in the subfamily Arctiinae. It was described by Herbert Druce in 1885. It is found in Mexico, Guatemala and Nicaragua.
