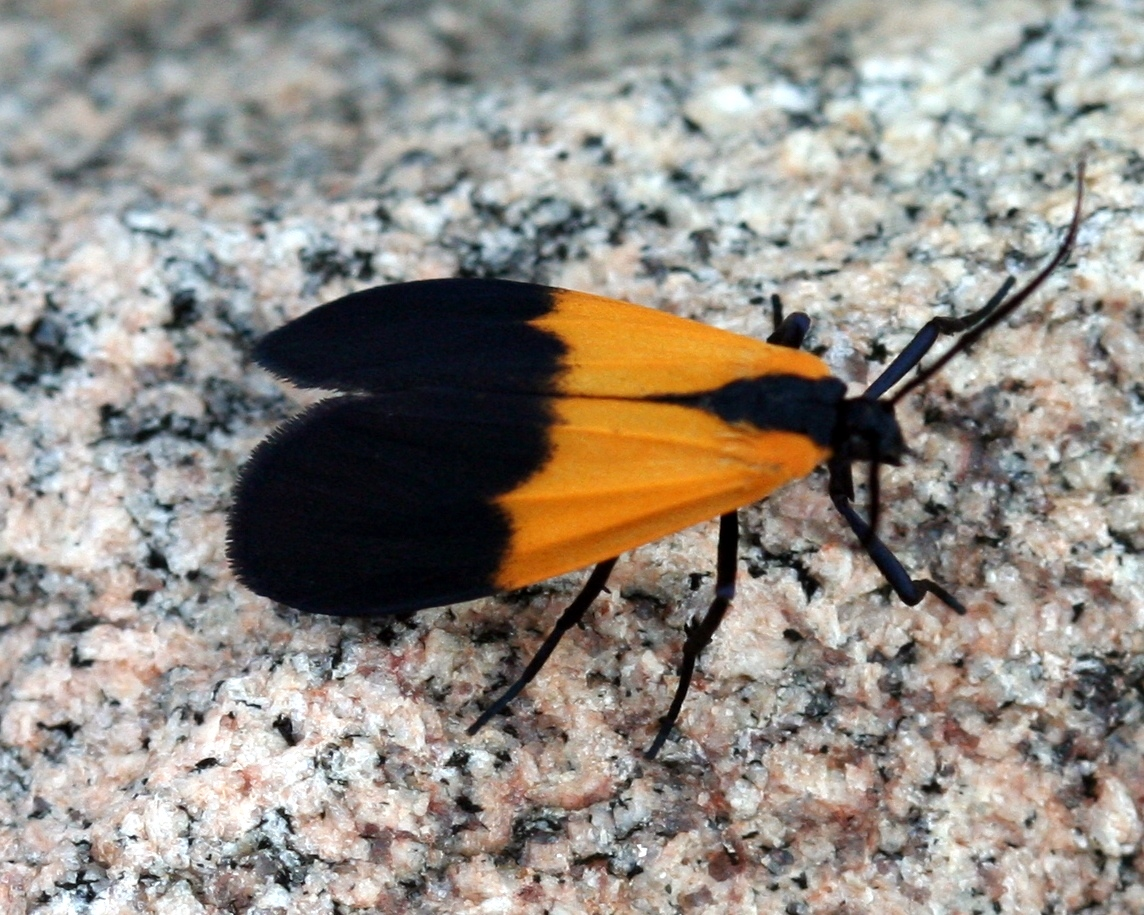
- Lycomorpha pholus

Scientific classification
- Domain: Eukaryota
- Kingdom: Animalia
- Phylum: Arthropoda
- Class: Insecta
- Order: Lepidoptera
- Superfamily: Noctuoidea
- Family: Erebidae
- Subfamily: Arctiinae
- Subtribe: Cisthenina
- Genus: Lycomorpha; Harris, 1839

Synonyms
- Anatolmis Packard, 1864; Prepodes Herrich-Schäffer, [1855]

= Lycomorpha =

Genus of moths

Lycomorpha is a genus of moths in the family Erebidae. The genus was erected by Thaddeus William Harris in 1839.

== Species ==
- Lycomorpha grotei (Packard, 1864)
- Lycomorpha regulus (Grinnell, 1903)
- Lycomorpha fulgens (H. Edwards, 1881)
- Lycomorpha splendens Barnes & McDunnough, 1912
- Lycomorpha pholus (Drury, 1773)
- Lycomorpha desertus H. Edwards, 1881
