= Padenia triseparata =

Scientific classification
- Kingdom: Animalia
- Phylum: Arthropoda
- Class: Insecta
- Order: Lepidoptera
- Superfamily: Noctuoidea
- Family: Erebidae
- Subfamily: Arctiinae
- Genus: Padenia
- Species: P. triseparata

Binomial name
- Padenia triseparata Debauche, 1938

Species of moth

Padenia triseparata is a moth of the subfamily Arctiinae. It was described by Hubert Robert Debauche in 1938. It is found on Sulawesi.
