= Tortricosia blanda =

Scientific classification
- Domain: Eukaryota
- Kingdom: Animalia
- Phylum: Arthropoda
- Class: Insecta
- Order: Lepidoptera
- Superfamily: Noctuoidea
- Family: Erebidae
- Subfamily: Arctiinae
- Genus: Tortricosia
- Species: T. blanda

Binomial name
- Tortricosia blanda (van Eecke, 1926)

Synonyms
- Mellona blanda van Eecke, 1926; Mellona blanda van Eecke, 1927

Species of moth

Tortricosia blanda is a species of moth in the subfamily Arctiinae first described by van Eecke in 1926. It is found on Sumatra, Peninsular Malaysia and Borneo.
