= Rhabdatomis melinda =

Scientific classification
- Kingdom: Animalia
- Phylum: Arthropoda
- Class: Insecta
- Order: Lepidoptera
- Superfamily: Noctuoidea
- Family: Erebidae
- Subfamily: Arctiinae
- Genus: Rhabdatomis
- Species: R. melinda

Binomial name
- Rhabdatomis melinda (Schaus, 1911)

Synonyms
- Diarhabdosia melinda Schaus, 1911

Species of moth

Rhabdatomis melinda is a moth in the subfamily Arctiinae. It was described by Schaus in 1911. It is found in Costa Rica.
