= Oxacme calcarea =

Scientific classification
- Kingdom: Animalia
- Phylum: Arthropoda
- Clade: Pancrustacea
- Class: Insecta
- Order: Lepidoptera
- Superfamily: Noctuoidea
- Family: Erebidae
- Subfamily: Arctiinae
- Genus: Oxacme
- Species: O. calcarea

Binomial name
- Oxacme calcarea Holloway, 2001

Species of moth

Oxacme calcarea is a moth in the subfamily Arctiinae. It was described by Jeremy Daniel Holloway in 2001. It is found on Borneo. The habitat consists of slopes in lowland areas and the lower montane zone.

The length of the forewings is about 6 mm.
