= Lycomorpha fulgens =

Scientific classification
- Domain: Eukaryota
- Kingdom: Animalia
- Phylum: Arthropoda
- Class: Insecta
- Order: Lepidoptera
- Superfamily: Noctuoidea
- Family: Erebidae
- Subfamily: Arctiinae
- Genus: Lycomorpha
- Species: L. fulgens

Binomial name
- Lycomorpha fulgens (H. Edwards, 1881)

Synonyms
- Anatolmis fulgens H. Edwards, 1881; Lycomorpha tenuimargo Holland, 1903

Species of moth

Lycomorpha fulgens is a moth of the family Erebidae. It was described by Henry Edwards in 1881. It is found in North America, including Arizona, California, Colorado and New Mexico.

The wingspan is about 30 mm (1.2 in). The forewings are mostly red with a black margin. The hindwings are almost entirely black.
