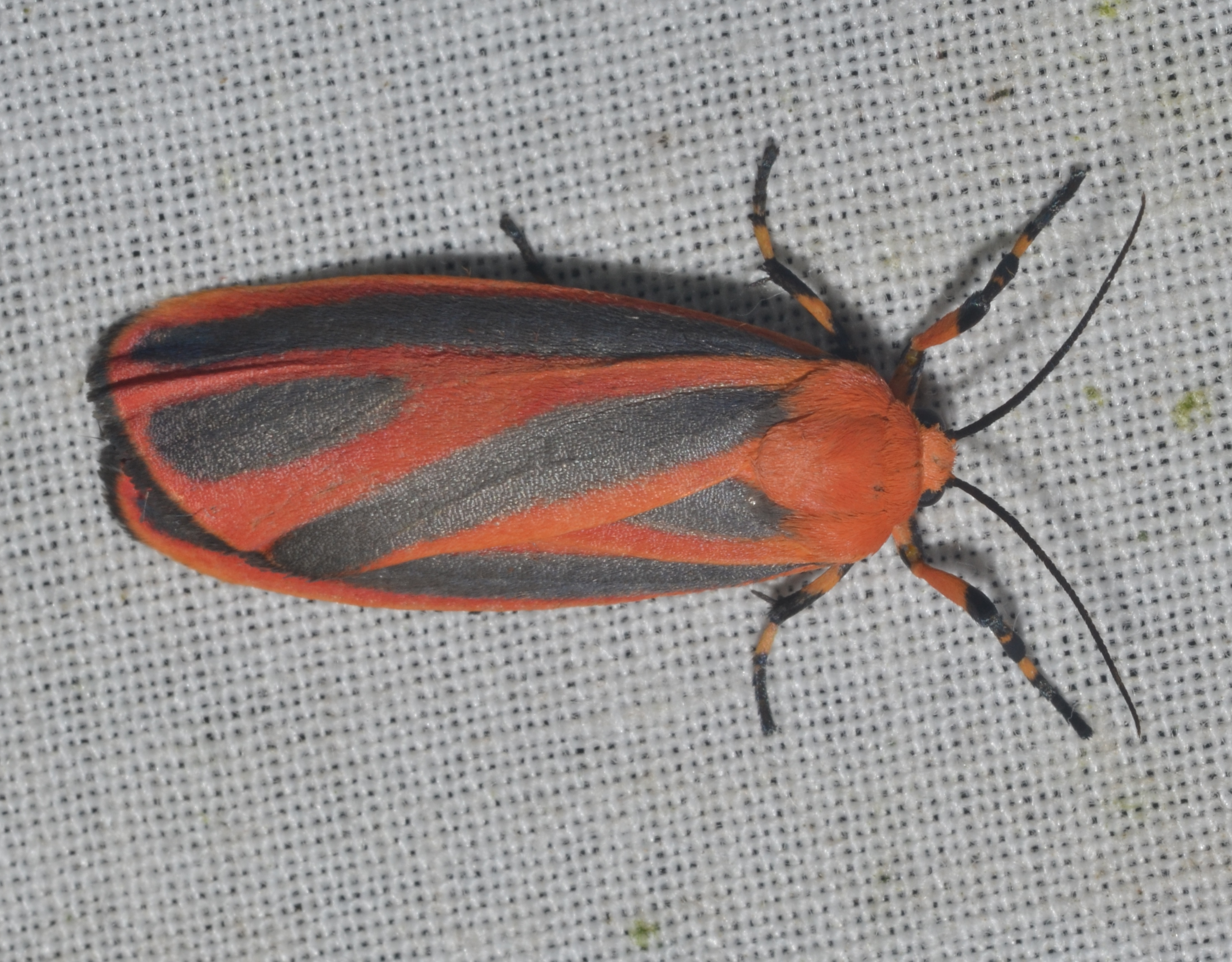

Scientific classification
- Domain: Eukaryota
- Kingdom: Animalia
- Phylum: Arthropoda
- Class: Insecta
- Order: Lepidoptera
- Superfamily: Noctuoidea
- Family: Erebidae
- Subfamily: Arctiinae
- Genus: Hypoprepia
- Species: H. miniata

Binomial name
- Hypoprepia miniata (Kirby, 1837)

Synonyms
- Lithosia miniata Kirby, 1837; Gnophria vittata Harris, 1841

= Hypoprepia miniata =

Species of moth

Hypoprepia miniata, the scarlet-winged lichen moth or scarlet lichen moth, is a moth of the family Erebidae. The species was first described by William Kirby in 1837. It is found from British Columbia south through the western side of the Rocky Mountains to Arizona and Texas. It is also found throughout eastern North America.

The length of the forewings is 14–17 mm. Adults are on wing from July to August in the west and from April to September in the east.

The larvae feed on lichen growing on trees, preferably pines. The species overwinters in the larval stage.

== Subspecies ==
- Hypoprepia miniata miniata
- Hypoprepia miniata mississippiensis Barnes & Benjamin, 1926
