= Garudinia acornuta =

Scientific classification
- Kingdom: Animalia
- Phylum: Arthropoda
- Clade: Pancrustacea
- Class: Insecta
- Order: Lepidoptera
- Superfamily: Noctuoidea
- Family: Erebidae
- Subfamily: Arctiinae
- Genus: Garudinia
- Species: G. acornuta

Binomial name
- Garudinia acornuta Holloway, 1982

Species of moth

Garudinia acornuta is a moth of the family Erebidae first described by Jeremy Daniel Holloway in 1982. It is found on Peninsular Malaysia, Borneo and Java. The habitat consists of dipterocarp forests, lower montane forests and lowland forests.
