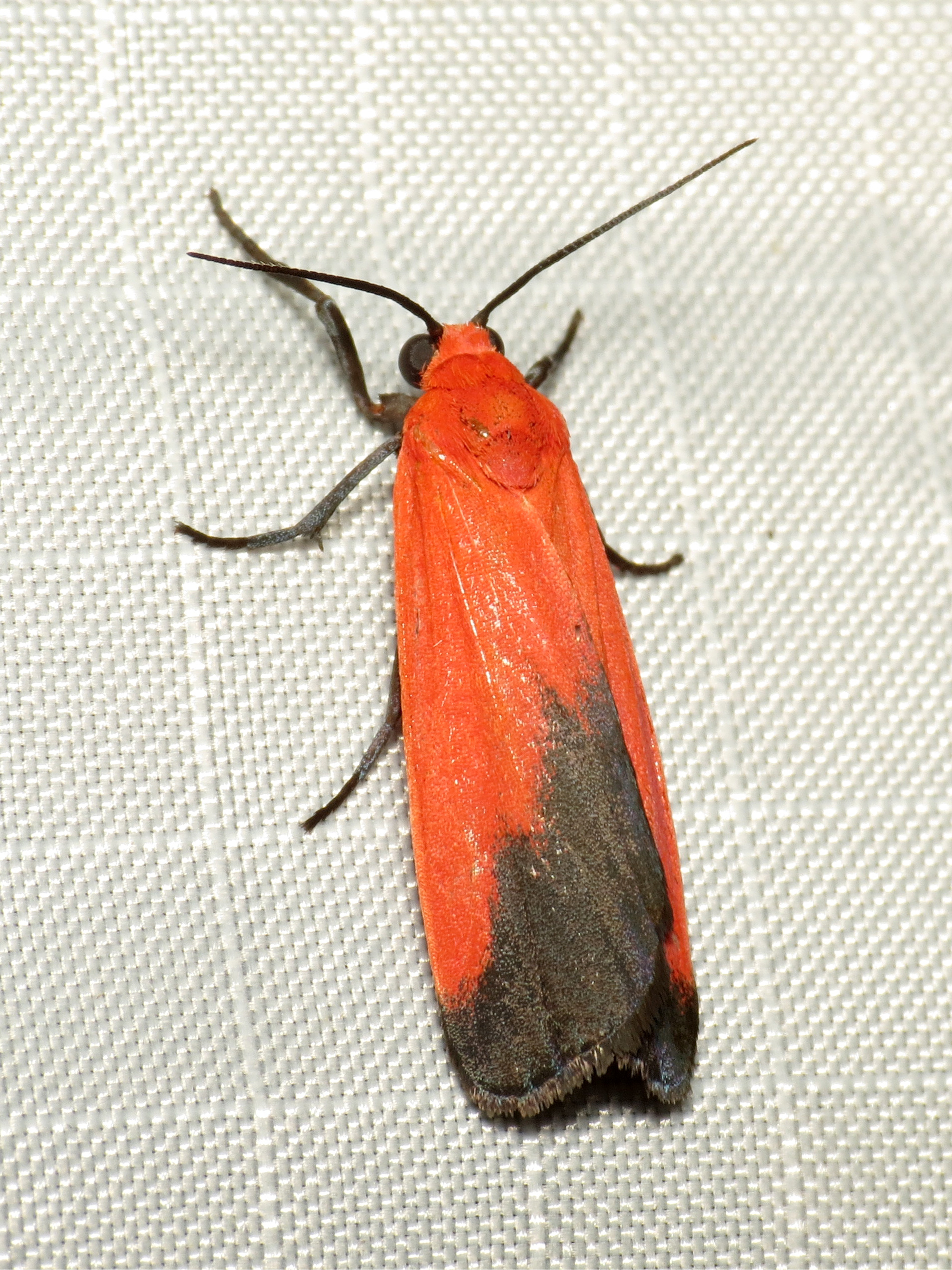

Scientific classification
- Kingdom: Animalia
- Phylum: Arthropoda
- Clade: Pancrustacea
- Class: Insecta
- Order: Lepidoptera
- Superfamily: Noctuoidea
- Family: Erebidae
- Subfamily: Arctiinae
- Genus: Ptychoglene
- Species: P. coccinea

Binomial name
- Ptychoglene coccinea (H. Edwards, 1886)

Synonyms
- Lycomorpha coccinea H. Edwards, 1886

= Ptychoglene coccinea =

Species of moth

Ptychoglene coccinea is a moth in the subfamily Arctiinae. It was described by Henry Edwards in 1886. It is found in Arizona.
