= Meteugoa fasciosa =

Scientific classification
- Kingdom: Animalia
- Phylum: Arthropoda
- Class: Insecta
- Order: Lepidoptera
- Superfamily: Noctuoidea
- Family: Erebidae
- Subfamily: Arctiinae
- Genus: Meteugoa
- Species: M. fasciosa

Binomial name
- Meteugoa fasciosa Rothschild & Jordan, 1901

Species of moth

Meteugoa fasciosa is a moth of the family Erebidae. It was described by Rothschild and Jordan in 1901. It is found on the Solomon Islands.
