= Garudinia macrolatana =

Scientific classification
- Kingdom: Animalia
- Phylum: Arthropoda
- Clade: Pancrustacea
- Class: Insecta
- Order: Lepidoptera
- Superfamily: Noctuoidea
- Family: Erebidae
- Subfamily: Arctiinae
- Genus: Garudinia
- Species: G. macrolatana

Binomial name
- Garudinia macrolatana Holloway, 2001

Species of moth

Garudinia macrolatana is a moth of the family Erebidae first described by Jeremy Daniel Holloway in 2001. It is found on Borneo. The habitat consists of lowland forests.

The wingspan is 7 mm for males and 7–8 mm for females.
