= Utriculofera =

Scientific classification
- Kingdom: Animalia
- Phylum: Arthropoda
- Class: Insecta
- Order: Lepidoptera
- Superfamily: Noctuoidea
- Family: Erebidae
- Subfamily: Arctiinae
- Tribe: Lithosiini
- Genus: Utriculofera; Hampson, 1893

Genus of moths

Utriculofera is a genus of moths in the subfamily Arctiinae erected by George Hampson in 1893.

== Description ==
Palpi porrect (extending forward) and reaching beyond the frontal tuft. Antennae of male with a very hollowed-out vesicle after the basal joint, with ciliated terminal. Abdomen has a pair of lateral long hair tufts arise from the third segment. Tibia with long spurs. Forewings with arched costa from near the base. The outer margin straight. Male has a basal fold containing tufts of hair in the inner margin. Vein 3 from before angle of cell, veins 4 and 5 from close to angle and vein 6 from below upper angle. Veins 7 to 9 stalked. Hindwings with vein 4 from angle of cell, vein 5 from above angle and vein 3 absent. Veins 6 and 7 stalked and vein 8 arise near end of cell.

== Species ==
- Utriculofera aplaga Hampson, 1900
- Utriculofera fuscapex Hampson, 1893
- Utriculofera leucogrammus Rothschild, 1916
- Utriculofera macroplaga Hampson, 1900
- Utriculofera muricolor Rothschild, 1913
- Utriculofera utricularia Rothschild, 1912
- Utriculofera variegata Rothschild, 1912

== Former species ==
- Utriculofera tetrastigmata Rothschild, 1916
