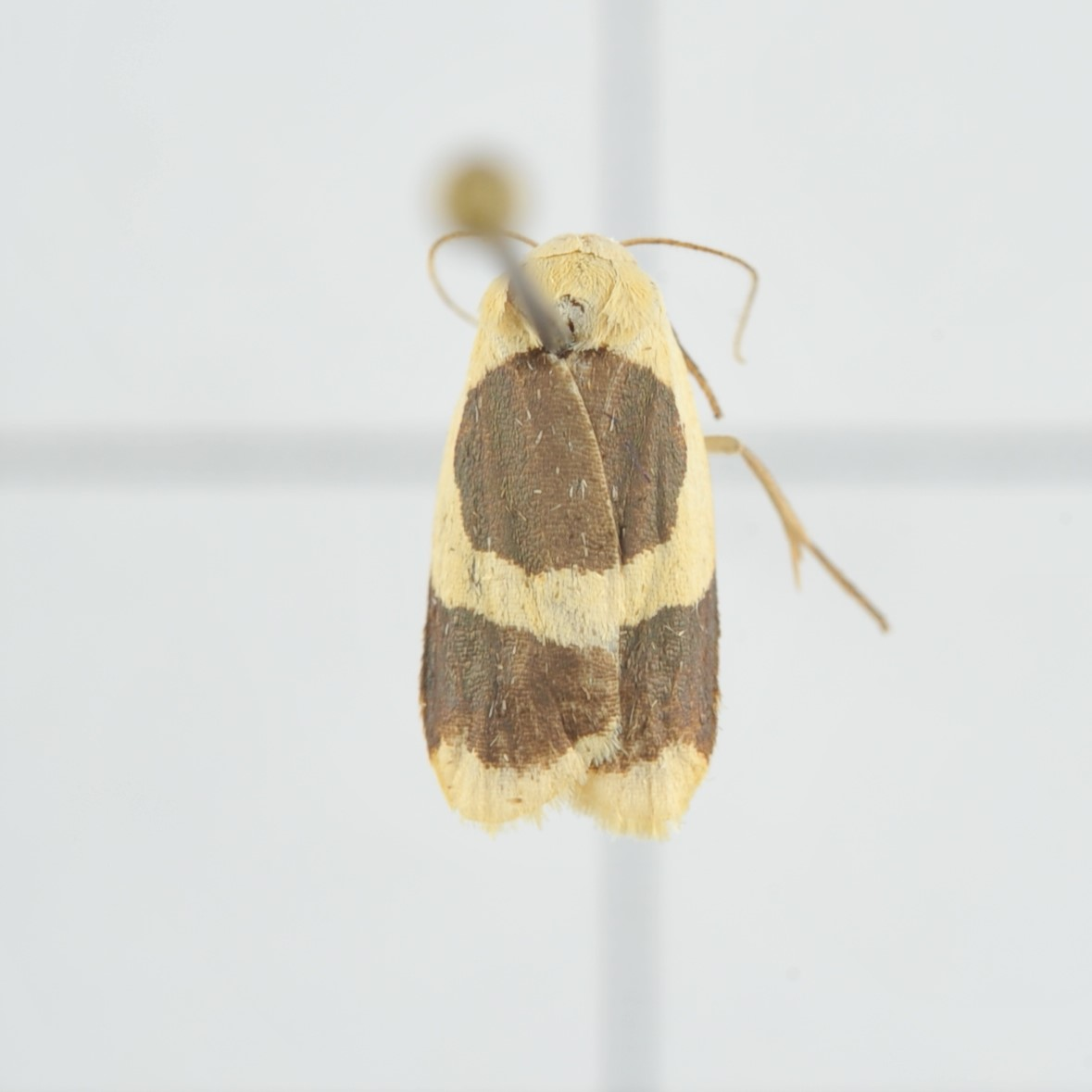

Scientific classification
- Domain: Eukaryota
- Kingdom: Animalia
- Phylum: Arthropoda
- Class: Insecta
- Order: Lepidoptera
- Superfamily: Noctuoidea
- Family: Erebidae
- Subfamily: Arctiinae
- Genus: Garudinia
- Species: G. bimaculata

Binomial name
- Garudinia bimaculata Rothschild, 1912

= Garudinia bimaculata =

Species of moth

Garudinia bimaculata is a species of moth in the family Erebidae first described by Walter Rothschild in 1912. It is found on Borneo and Sulawesi and in Taiwan.
