= Cyclosodes =

Scientific classification
- Kingdom: Animalia
- Phylum: Arthropoda
- Class: Insecta
- Order: Lepidoptera
- Superfamily: Noctuoidea
- Family: Erebidae
- Subfamily: Arctiinae
- Genus: Cyclosodes; Hampson, 1901
- Species: C. flavicostata

Binomial name
- Cyclosodes flavicostata Hampson, 1901

Genus of moths

Cyclosodes is a monotypic moth genus in the family Erebidae. Its single species, Cyclosodes flavicostata, is found on Borneo. Both the genus and species were first described by George Hampson in 1901.
