= Katmeteugoa =

Scientific classification
- Domain: Eukaryota
- Kingdom: Animalia
- Phylum: Arthropoda
- Class: Insecta
- Order: Lepidoptera
- Superfamily: Noctuoidea
- Family: Erebidae
- Subfamily: Arctiinae
- Genus: Katmeteugoa van Eecke, 1920
- Species: K. hampsonia

Binomial name
- Katmeteugoa hampsonia van Eecke, 1920

Genus of moths

Katmeteuoga is a monotypic moth genus in the family Erebidae. Its single species, Katmeteugoa hampsonia, is found on Java. Both the genus and species were first described by van Eecke in 1920.
