= Lobobasis =

Scientific classification
- Kingdom: Animalia
- Phylum: Arthropoda
- Class: Insecta
- Order: Lepidoptera
- Superfamily: Noctuoidea
- Family: Erebidae
- Subfamily: Arctiinae
- Genus: Lobobasis; Hampson, 1896
- Species: L. niveimaculata

Binomial name
- Lobobasis niveimaculata Hampson, 1896

Genus of moths

Lobobasis is a monotypic moth genus in the family Erebidae. Its single species, Lobobasis niveimaculata, is found from the Indian state of Sikkim, Bhutan and Sundaland to Queensland, the Solomon Islands and New Guinea. The habitat consists of lower montane forests, upper montane forests and various types of lowland forests. Both the genus and species were first described by George Hampson in 1896.

Adults are sexually dimorphic.
