= Malesia eugoana =

Scientific classification
- Kingdom: Animalia
- Phylum: Arthropoda
- Class: Insecta
- Order: Lepidoptera
- Superfamily: Noctuoidea
- Family: Erebidae
- Subfamily: Arctiinae
- Tribe: Lithosiini
- Subtribe: Cisthenina
- Genus: Malesia van Eecke, 1920
- Species: M. eugoana

Binomial name
- Malesia eugoana van Eecke, 1920

Species of moth

Malesia is a monotypic moth genus in the subfamily Arctiinae. Its single species, Malesia eugoana, is found on Java and Borneo. Both the genus and species were first described by van Eecke in 1920.
