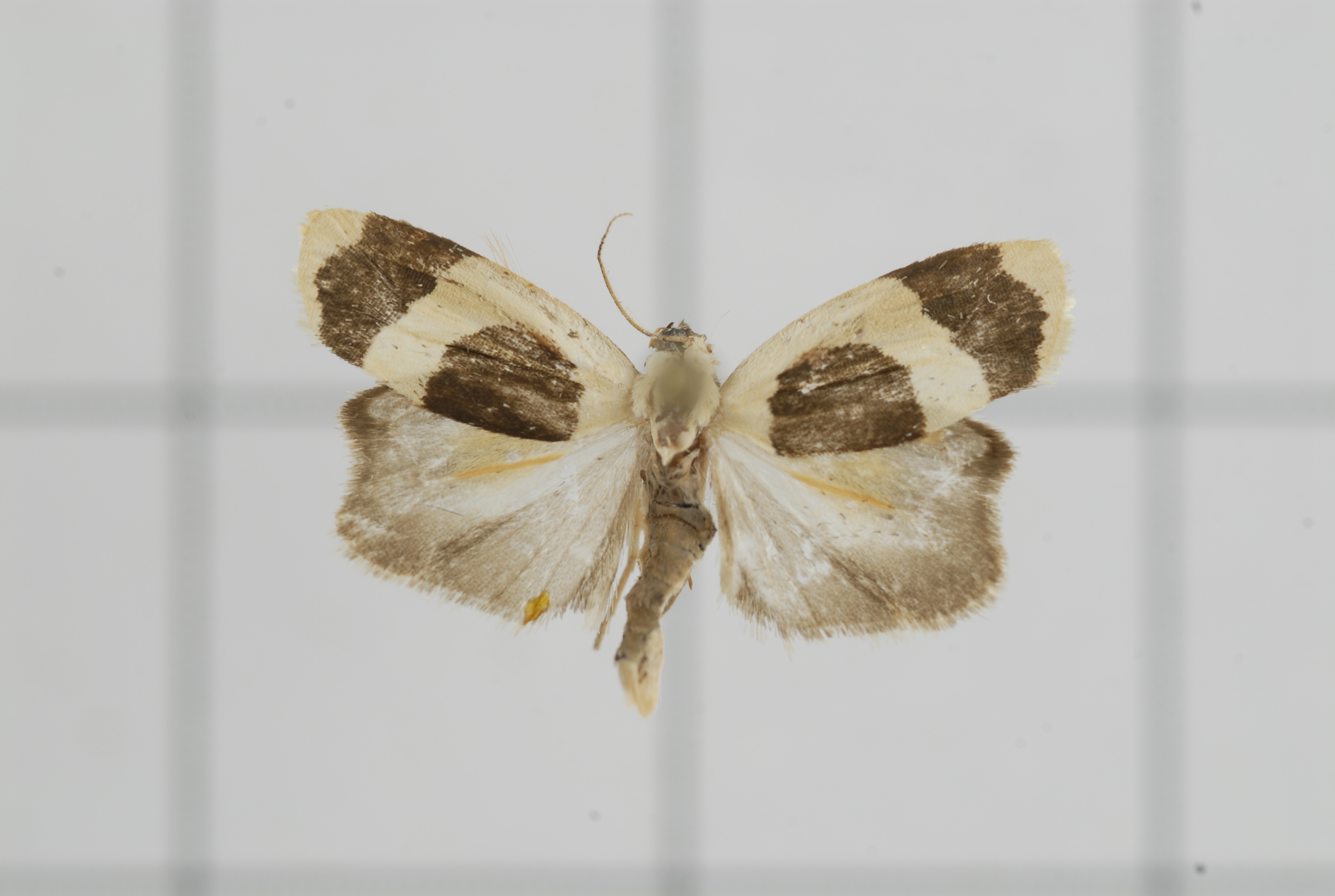

Scientific classification
- Kingdom: Animalia
- Phylum: Arthropoda
- Class: Insecta
- Order: Lepidoptera
- Superfamily: Noctuoidea
- Family: Erebidae
- Subfamily: Arctiinae
- Genus: Garudinia
- Species: G. simulana

Binomial name
- Garudinia simulana (Walker, 1863)

Synonyms
- Tospitis simulana Walker, 1863

= Garudinia simulana =

Species of moth

Garudinia simulana is a moth of the family Erebidae first described by Francis Walker in 1863. It is found on Borneo. The habitat consists of lower montane forests.
