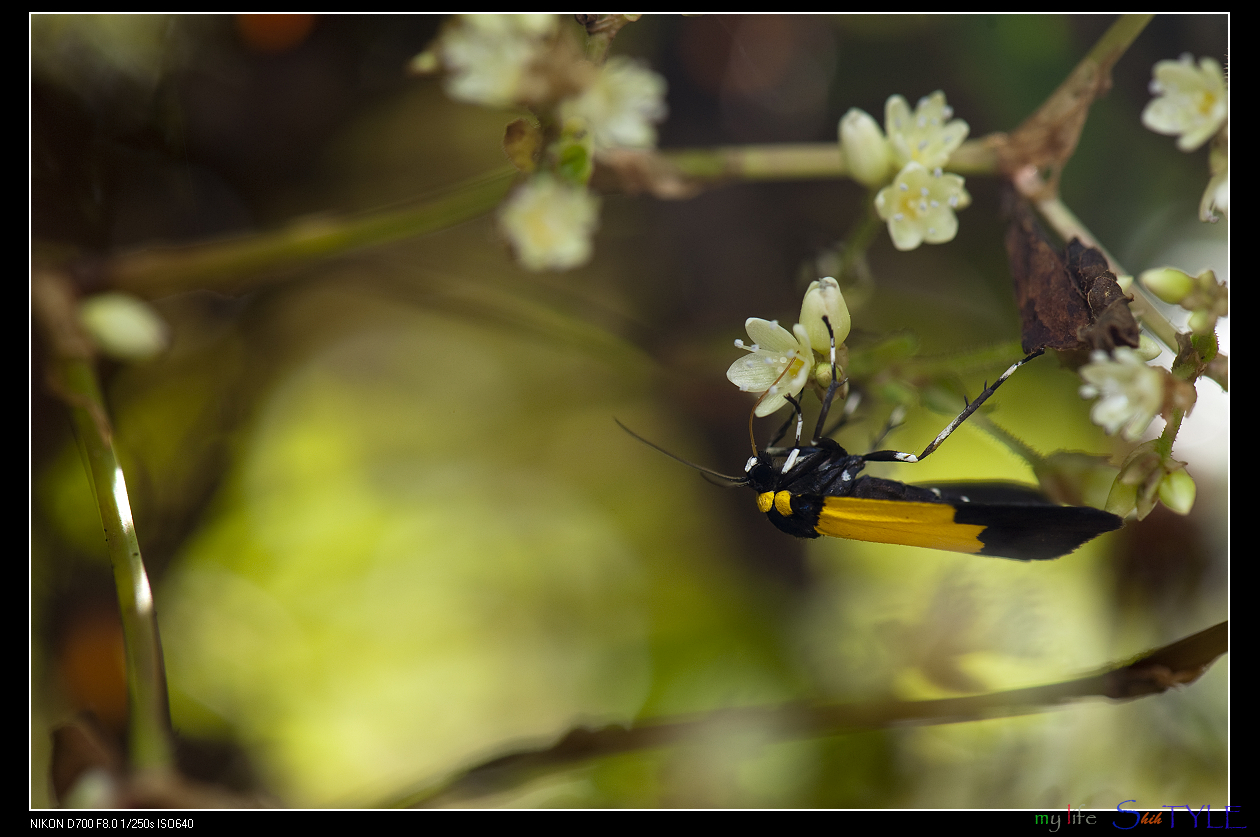
- Scaptestyle bicolor integra

Scientific classification
- Kingdom: Animalia
- Phylum: Arthropoda
- Class: Insecta
- Order: Lepidoptera
- Superfamily: Noctuoidea
- Family: Erebidae
- Subfamily: Arctiinae
- Tribe: Lithosiini
- Subtribe: Cisthenina
- Genus: Scaptesyle; Walker, 1854

Synonyms
- Chiriphe Walker, [1863]

= Scaptesyle =

Genus of moths

Scaptesyle is a genus of moths in the subfamily Arctiinae first described by Francis Walker in 1854.

== Description ==
Palpi upturned reaching vertex of head. Antennae of male minutely ciliated. Tibia with long spurs. Forewings with stalked veins 4 and 5, vein 6 from below angle of cell and stalked veins 7,8 and 9. Hindwings with stalked veins 3,4 and 6,7. Vein 5 from above angle of cell and vein 8 from middle of cell.

== Species ==
- Scaptesyle aurigena Walker, 1863
- Scaptesyle buergersi Gaede, 1926
- Scaptesyle bicolor Walker, 1864
- Scaptesyle bifasciata Snellen, 1904
- Scaptesyle bipartita Rothschild, 1913
- Scaptesyle bizone Rothschild, 1912
- Scaptesyle dichotoma Meyrick, 1886
- Scaptesyle dictyota Meyrick, 1886
- Scaptesyle equidistans Lucas, 1890
- Scaptesyle fovealis Hampson, 1903
- Scaptesyle ixias Hampson, 1900
- Scaptesyle luzonica Swinhoe, 1916
- Scaptesyle middletoni (Turner, 1941)
- Scaptesyle mirabilis Hampson, 1900
- Scaptesyle monogrammaria Walker, 1862
- Scaptesyle plumosus Rothschild, 1912
- Scaptesyle sororigena Holloway, 2001
- Scaptesyle subtricolor van Eecke, 1927
- Scaptesyle tetramita Turner, 1940
- Scaptesyle thestias Snellen, 1904
- Scaptesyle tricolor Walker, 1854
- Scaptesyle violinitens Rothschild, 1912

== Former species ==
- Scaptesyle aroa Bethune-Baker, 1904
- Scaptesyle incerta Semper, 1899
- Scaptesyle pseudoblabia Hampson, 1918
- Scaptesyle rothschildi Draudt, 1914
