= Cyana tegyra =

Scientific classification
- Domain: Eukaryota
- Kingdom: Animalia
- Phylum: Arthropoda
- Class: Insecta
- Order: Lepidoptera
- Superfamily: Noctuoidea
- Family: Erebidae
- Subfamily: Arctiinae
- Genus: Cyana
- Species: C. tegyra

Binomial name
- Cyana tegyra (H. Druce, 1899)

Synonyms
- Exotrocha tegyra H. Druce, 1899; Chionaema tegyra; Exotrocha tricolor H. Druce, 1899 (not Swinhoe, 1892); Chionaema postdivisa Rothschild, 1913; Chionaema dampierensis Rothschild, 1916; Chionaema acutipennella Röber, 1925

Species of moth

Cyana tegyra is a moth of the family Erebidae. It was described by Herbert Druce in 1899. It is found on New Guinea.

== Subspecies ==
- Cyana tegyra postdivisa Rothschild, 1913
- Cyana tegyra tegyra Druce, 1899
