= Cyana tricolora =

Scientific classification
- Domain: Eukaryota
- Kingdom: Animalia
- Phylum: Arthropoda
- Class: Insecta
- Order: Lepidoptera
- Superfamily: Noctuoidea
- Family: Erebidae
- Subfamily: Arctiinae
- Genus: Cyana
- Species: C. tricolora

Binomial name
- Cyana tricolora Butler, 1877

Synonyms
- Dyphlebia tricolora Butler, 1877; Chionaema tricolora; Chionaema vulcanica Rothschild, 1916

Species of moth

Cyana tricolora is a moth of the family Erebidae. It was described by Arthur Gardiner Butler in 1877. It is found in New Guinea.
