= Cyana straminea =

Scientific classification
- Kingdom: Animalia
- Phylum: Arthropoda
- Class: Insecta
- Order: Lepidoptera
- Superfamily: Noctuoidea
- Family: Erebidae
- Subfamily: Arctiinae
- Genus: Cyana
- Species: C. straminea

Binomial name
- Cyana straminea (Hampson, 1914)

Synonyms
- Chionaema straminea Hampson, 1914

Species of moth

Cyana straminea is a moth of the family Erebidae. It was described by George Hampson in 1914. It is found in Taiwan.
