= Cyana grandis =

Scientific classification
- Kingdom: Animalia
- Phylum: Arthropoda
- Class: Insecta
- Order: Lepidoptera
- Superfamily: Noctuoidea
- Family: Erebidae
- Subfamily: Arctiinae
- Genus: Cyana
- Species: C. grandis

Binomial name
- Cyana grandis (Mabille, 1879)

Synonyms
- Bizone grandis Mabille, 1879

Species of moth

Cyana grandis is a moth of the family Erebidae first described by Paul Mabille in 1879. It is found on Madagascar.

This species is white, with three transversal red lines on the forewings. The wingspan is 48 millimetres (1.9 in).
