= Cyana fumea =

Scientific classification
- Kingdom: Animalia
- Phylum: Arthropoda
- Clade: Pancrustacea
- Class: Insecta
- Order: Lepidoptera
- Superfamily: Noctuoidea
- Family: Erebidae
- Subfamily: Arctiinae
- Genus: Cyana
- Species: C. fumea

Binomial name
- Cyana fumea (Hampson, 1900)

Synonyms
- Chionaema fumea Hampson, 1900; Chionaema melanochlorus Rothschild, 1916

Species of moth

Cyana fumea is a moth of the family Erebidae. It was described by George Hampson in 1900. It is found in New Guinea.
