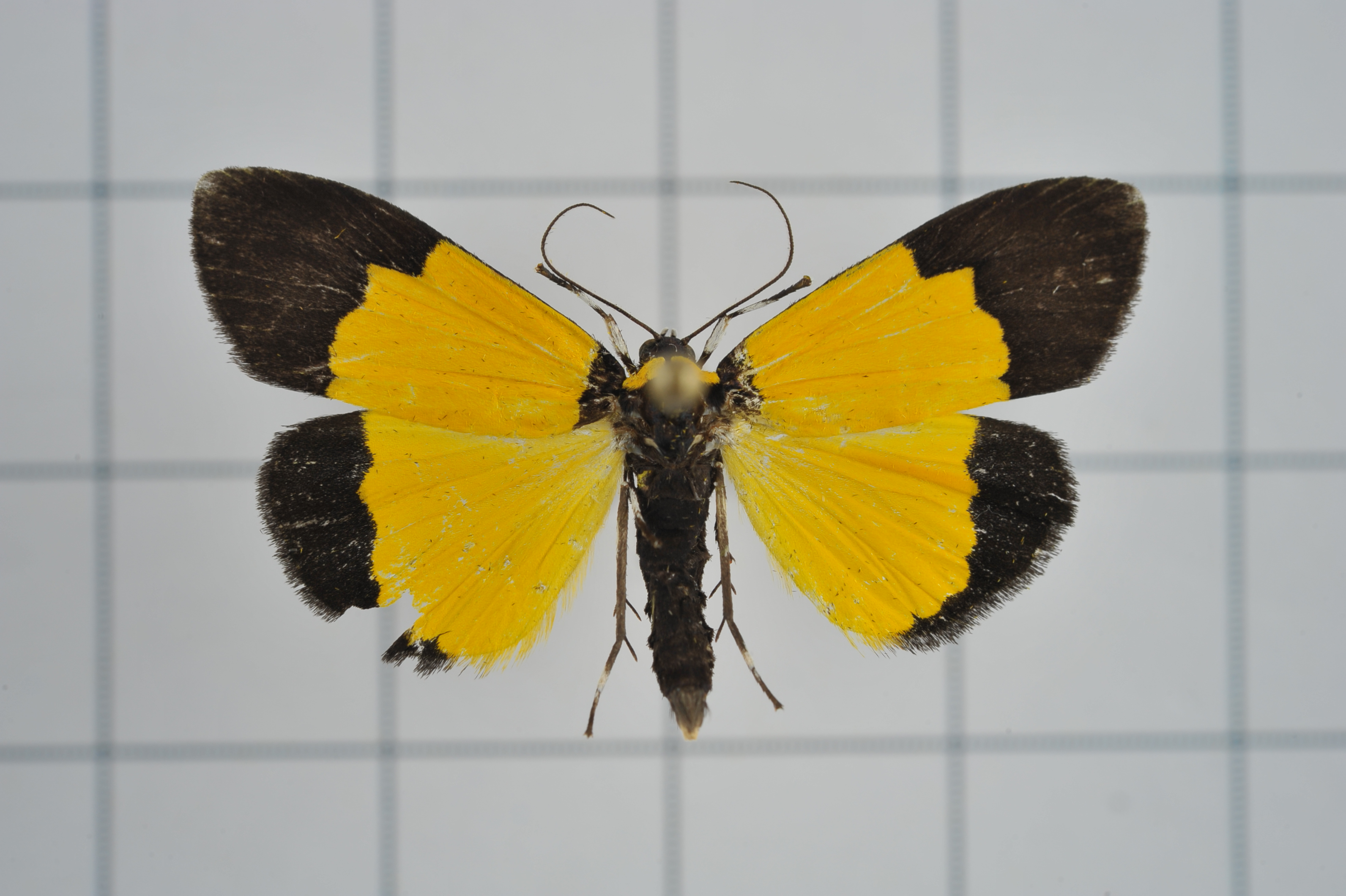

Scientific classification
- Kingdom: Animalia
- Phylum: Arthropoda
- Class: Insecta
- Order: Lepidoptera
- Superfamily: Noctuoidea
- Family: Erebidae
- Subfamily: Arctiinae
- Genus: Scaptesyle
- Species: S. bicolor

Binomial name
- Scaptesyle bicolor Walker, 1864

Synonyms
- Scaptesyle integra Swinhoe, 1894; Dichromia nietneri Hampson, 1894

= Scaptesyle bicolor =

Species of moth

Scaptesyle bicolor is a moth in the subfamily Arctiinae. It was described by Francis Walker in 1864. It is found in Sri Lanka, Assam in India and Taiwan.

== Description ==
Its wingspan is 30 mm. The species differs from Scaptesyle tricolor, in being deep black and bright golden yellow. Forewings with the broader outer margin and wholly black. Hindwings with much broader marginal black area and reaching anal angle. In Indian specimens, marginal black band is much narrower than Sri Lankan specimen.
