= Cyana mira =

Scientific classification
- Domain: Eukaryota
- Kingdom: Animalia
- Phylum: Arthropoda
- Class: Insecta
- Order: Lepidoptera
- Superfamily: Noctuoidea
- Family: Erebidae
- Subfamily: Arctiinae
- Genus: Cyana
- Species: C. mira

Binomial name
- Cyana mira (Röber, 1925)

Synonyms
- Chionaema mira Röber, 1925

Species of moth

Cyana mira is a moth of the family Erebidae. It was described by Röber in 1925. It is found in New Guinea.
