= Scaptesyle buergersi =

Scientific classification
- Kingdom: Animalia
- Phylum: Arthropoda
- Class: Insecta
- Order: Lepidoptera
- Superfamily: Noctuoidea
- Family: Erebidae
- Subfamily: Arctiinae
- Genus: Scaptesyle
- Species: S. buergersi

Binomial name
- Scaptesyle buergersi Gaede, 1926

Species of moth

Scaptesyle buergersi is a moth in the subfamily Arctiinae first described by Max Gaede in 1926. It is found in Papua New Guinea.
