= Cyana basisticta =

Scientific classification
- Kingdom: Animalia
- Phylum: Arthropoda
- Class: Insecta
- Order: Lepidoptera
- Superfamily: Noctuoidea
- Family: Erebidae
- Subfamily: Arctiinae
- Genus: Cyana
- Species: C. basisticta

Binomial name
- Cyana basisticta (Hampson, 1914)

Synonyms
- Chionaema basisticta Hampson, 1914; Chionaema additica A. E. Prout, 1919; Cyana additica

Species of moth

Cyana basisticta is a moth of the family Erebidae. It was described by George Hampson in 1914. It is found in Ghana and Sierra Leone.
