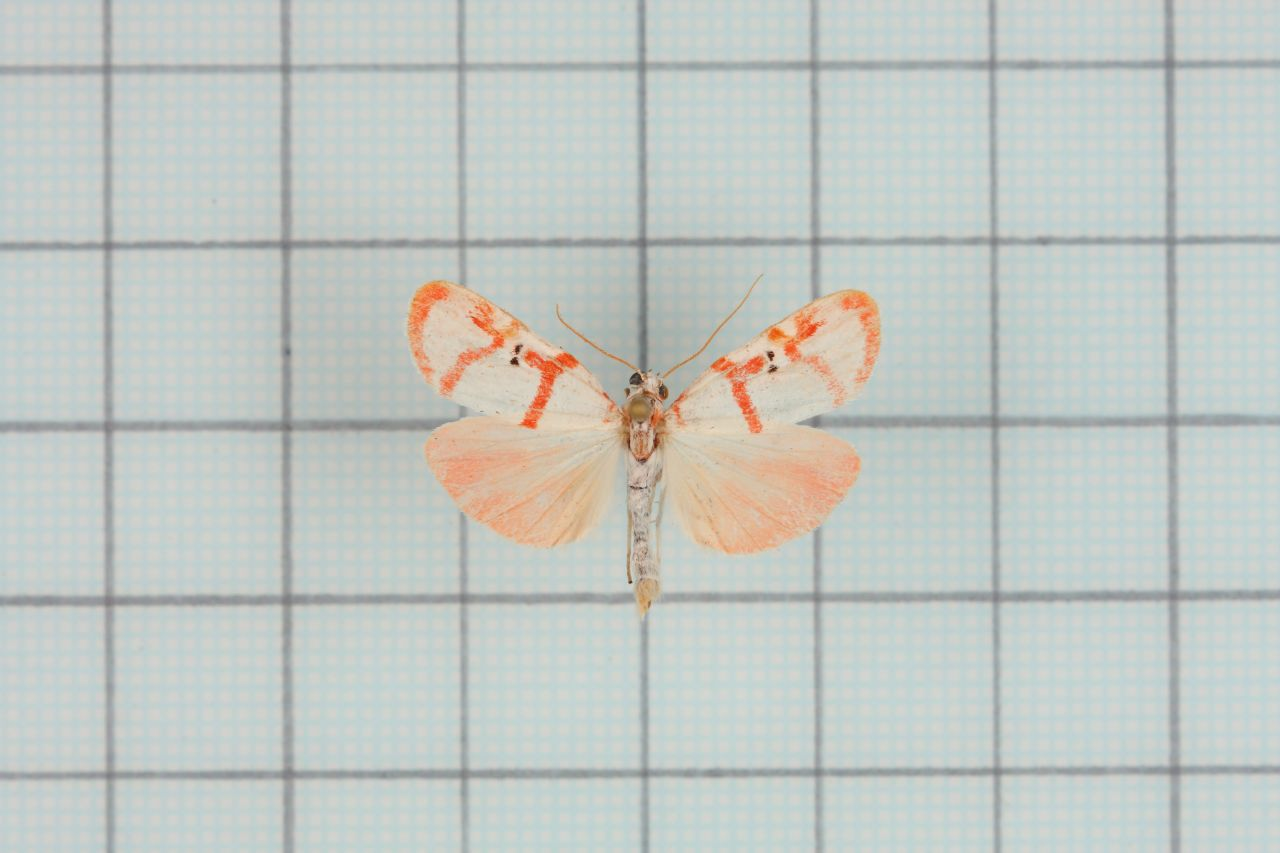

Scientific classification
- Kingdom: Animalia
- Phylum: Arthropoda
- Class: Insecta
- Order: Lepidoptera
- Superfamily: Noctuoidea
- Family: Erebidae
- Subfamily: Arctiinae
- Genus: Cyana
- Species: C. hamata

Binomial name
- Cyana hamata (Walker, 1854)

Synonyms
- Bizone hamata Walker, 1854; Bizone emergens Walker, [1865]

= Cyana hamata =

Species of moth

Cyana hamata is a moth of the family Erebidae first described by Francis Walker in 1854. It is found in Japan, China, Taiwan, Korea and Thailand.

The wingspan is 26–34 mm. Adults are on wing in February and September.
