= Cyana trigutta =

Scientific classification
- Kingdom: Animalia
- Phylum: Arthropoda
- Clade: Pancrustacea
- Class: Insecta
- Order: Lepidoptera
- Superfamily: Noctuoidea
- Family: Erebidae
- Subfamily: Arctiinae
- Genus: Cyana
- Species: C. trigutta

Binomial name
- Cyana trigutta (Walker, 1854)

Synonyms
- Isine trigutta Walker, 1854; Euproctis atrigutta Walker, 1862

Species of moth

Cyana trigutta is a moth of the family Erebidae. It was described by Francis Walker in 1854. It is found in Cameroon, Niger and Sierra Leone.
