= Cyana amabilis =

Scientific classification
- Domain: Eukaryota
- Kingdom: Animalia
- Phylum: Arthropoda
- Class: Insecta
- Order: Lepidoptera
- Superfamily: Noctuoidea
- Family: Erebidae
- Subfamily: Arctiinae
- Genus: Cyana
- Species: C. amabilis

Binomial name
- Cyana amabilis (Moore, 1877)

Synonyms
- Bizone amabilis Moore, 1877

Species of moth

Cyana amabilis is a moth of the family Erebidae. It was described by Frederic Moore in 1877. It is found on the Andamans and Nicobar Islands.
