= Scaptesyle aurigena =

Scientific classification
- Kingdom: Animalia
- Phylum: Arthropoda
- Class: Insecta
- Order: Lepidoptera
- Superfamily: Noctuoidea
- Family: Erebidae
- Subfamily: Arctiinae
- Genus: Scaptesyle
- Species: S. aurigena

Binomial name
- Scaptesyle aurigena (Walker, 1863)

Synonyms
- Tospitis aurigena Walker, 1863; Pitane biplaga Felder, 1875

Species of moth

Scaptesyle aurigena is a moth in the subfamily Arctiinae. It was described by Francis Walker in 1863. It is found on Borneo. The habitat consists of lower montane forests and lowland areas.
