= Cyana bigutta =

Scientific classification
- Domain: Eukaryota
- Kingdom: Animalia
- Phylum: Arthropoda
- Class: Insecta
- Order: Lepidoptera
- Superfamily: Noctuoidea
- Family: Erebidae
- Subfamily: Arctiinae
- Genus: Cyana
- Species: C. bigutta

Binomial name
- Cyana bigutta Karisch, 2005

Species of moth

Cyana bigutta is a moth of the family Erebidae. It was described by Timm Karisch in 2005. It is found in Kenya.
