= Cyana griseilinea =

Scientific classification
- Domain: Eukaryota
- Kingdom: Animalia
- Phylum: Arthropoda
- Class: Insecta
- Order: Lepidoptera
- Superfamily: Noctuoidea
- Family: Erebidae
- Subfamily: Arctiinae
- Genus: Cyana
- Species: C. griseilinea

Binomial name
- Cyana griseilinea (de Joannis, 1930)

Synonyms
- Agrisius griseilinea de Joannis, 1930

Species of moth

Cyana griseilinea is a moth of the subfamily Arctiinae. It is found in Vietnam.
