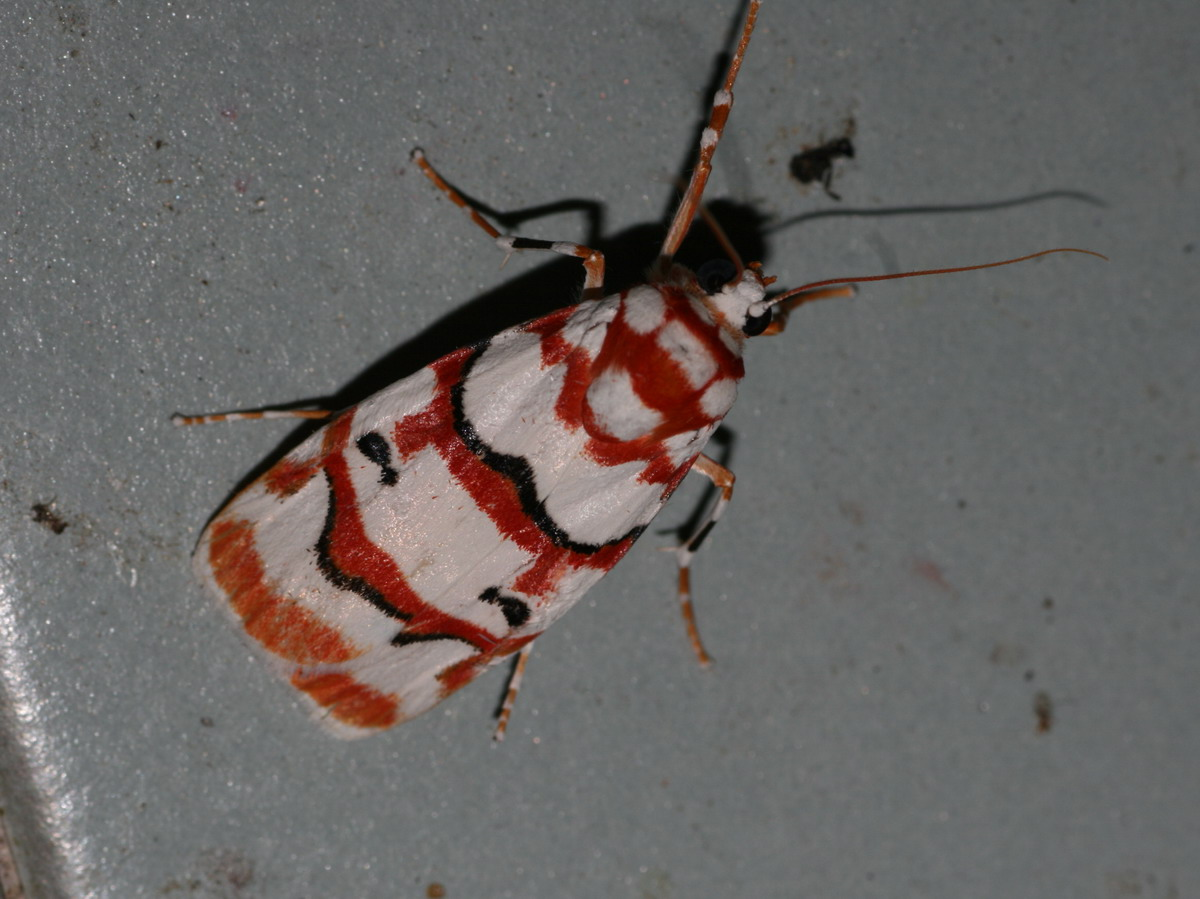

Scientific classification
- Kingdom: Animalia
- Phylum: Arthropoda
- Class: Insecta
- Order: Lepidoptera
- Superfamily: Noctuoidea
- Family: Erebidae
- Subfamily: Arctiinae
- Genus: Cyana
- Species: C. malayensis

Binomial name
- Cyana malayensis (Hampson, 1914)

Synonyms
- Chionaema malayensis Hampson, 1914; Cyana palawanensis Kishida, 1991

= Cyana malayensis =

Species of moth

Cyana malayensis is a moth of the family Erebidae. It is found in Peninsular Malaysia, Borneo and Palawan.

== Subspecies ==
- Cyana malayensis malayensis (Peninsular Malaysia, Borneo)
- Cyana malayensis palawanensis (Palawan)
