= Cyana amatura =

Scientific classification
- Kingdom: Animalia
- Phylum: Arthropoda
- Class: Insecta
- Order: Lepidoptera
- Superfamily: Noctuoidea
- Family: Erebidae
- Subfamily: Arctiinae
- Genus: Cyana
- Species: C. amatura

Binomial name
- Cyana amatura (Walker, 1863)

Synonyms
- Bizone amatura Walker, 1863; Bizone hova Guenée, 1865

Species of moth

Cyana amatura is a moth of the family Erebidae first described by Francis Walker in 1863. It is found on Madagascar.

This species is pure white, its wingspan is 24 millimetres (0.94 in).
