= Cyana paramargarethae =

Scientific classification
- Domain: Eukaryota
- Kingdom: Animalia
- Phylum: Arthropoda
- Class: Insecta
- Order: Lepidoptera
- Superfamily: Noctuoidea
- Family: Erebidae
- Subfamily: Arctiinae
- Genus: Cyana
- Species: C. paramargarethae

Binomial name
- Cyana paramargarethae Karisch & Dall'Asta, 2010

Species of moth

Cyana paramargarethae is a moth of the family Erebidae. It was described by Timm Karisch and Ugo Dall'Asta in 2010. It is found in the Democratic Republic of the Congo and Rwanda.
