= Scaptesyle dichotoma =

Scientific classification
- Kingdom: Animalia
- Phylum: Arthropoda
- Class: Insecta
- Order: Lepidoptera
- Superfamily: Noctuoidea
- Family: Erebidae
- Subfamily: Arctiinae
- Genus: Scaptesyle
- Species: S. dichotoma

Binomial name
- Scaptesyle dichotoma (Meyrick, 1886)

Synonyms
- Chiripe dichotoma Meyrick, 1886

Species of moth

Scaptesyle dichotoma, the reticulated footman, is a moth in the subfamily Arctiinae. It was described by Edward Meyrick in 1886. It is found in Australia, where it has been recorded from Queensland, New South Wales, and Victoria.

The wingspan is about 15 mm. The forewings are white with a black pattern. The hindwings are plain yellow.
