= Cyana fulvia =

Scientific classification
- Kingdom: Animalia
- Phylum: Arthropoda
- Class: Insecta
- Order: Lepidoptera
- Superfamily: Noctuoidea
- Family: Erebidae
- Subfamily: Arctiinae
- Genus: Cyana
- Species: C. fulvia

Binomial name
- Cyana fulvia (Linnaeus, 1758)

Synonyms
- Phalaena fulvia Linnaeus, 1758; Phalaena liboria Stoll, [1781]; Lithosia latitincta Walker, 1856; Chionaema fulvia laudans Hulstaert, 1923

Species of moth

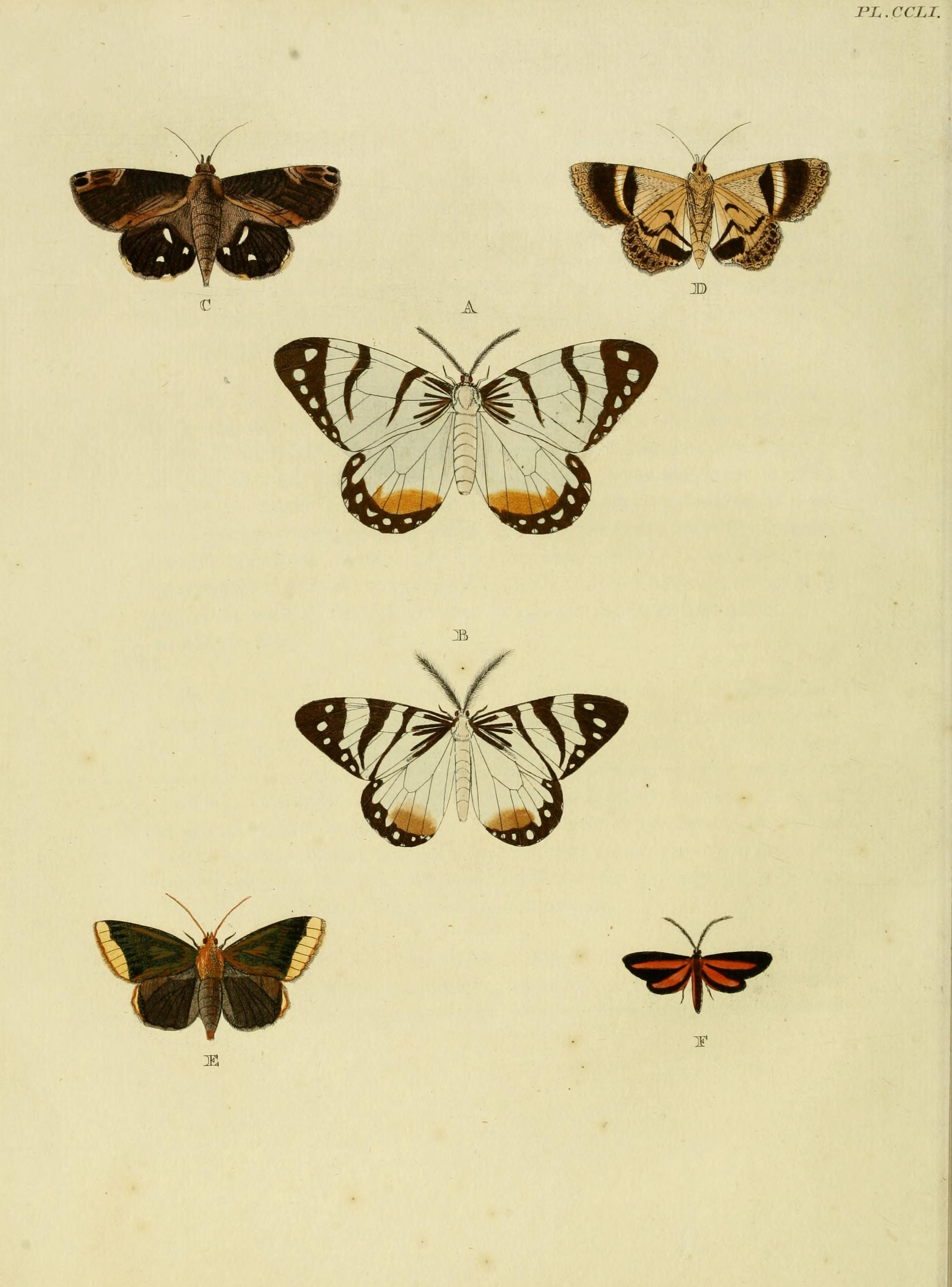
Cyana fulvia at F

Cyana fulvia is a moth of the family Erebidae. It was described by Carl Linnaeus in his 1758 10th edition of Systema Naturae. It is found in Sierra Leone.
