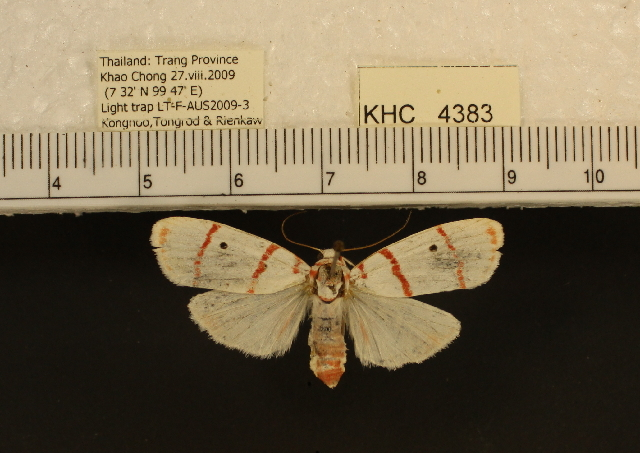

Scientific classification
- Kingdom: Animalia
- Phylum: Arthropoda
- Class: Insecta
- Order: Lepidoptera
- Superfamily: Noctuoidea
- Family: Erebidae
- Subfamily: Arctiinae
- Genus: Cyana
- Species: C. perornata

Binomial name
- Cyana perornata (Walker, 1854)

Synonyms
- Bizone perornata Walker, 1854; Chionaema perornata

= Cyana perornata =

Species of moth

Cyana perornata is a moth of the family Erebidae. It was described by Francis Walker in 1854. It is found in India (Sikkim, Assam) and Sundaland. The habitat consists of lowland forests, extending more weakly into lower montane forests.
