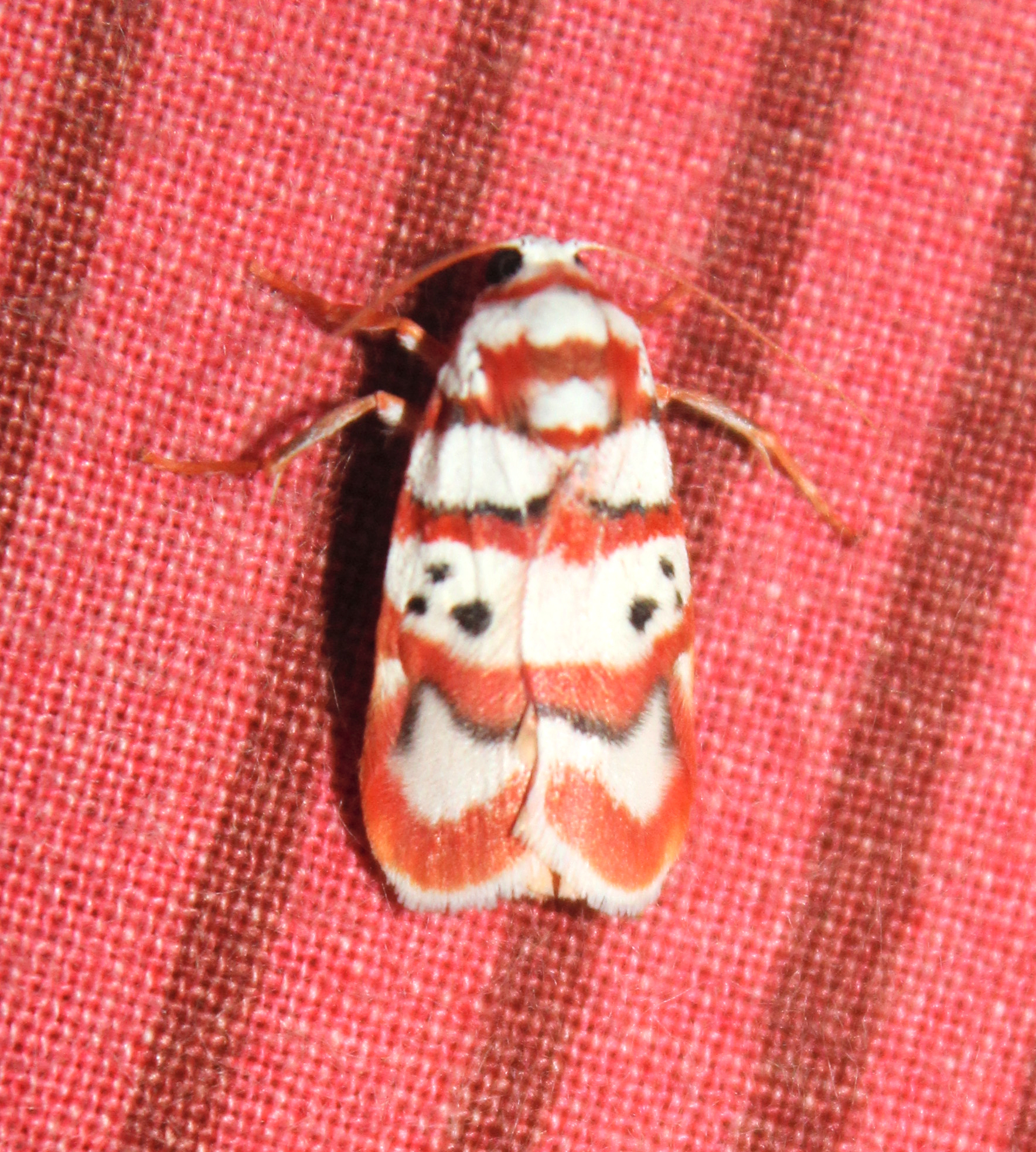

Scientific classification
- Kingdom: Animalia
- Phylum: Arthropoda
- Class: Insecta
- Order: Lepidoptera
- Superfamily: Noctuoidea
- Family: Erebidae
- Subfamily: Arctiinae
- Genus: Cyana
- Species: C. peregrina

Binomial name
- Cyana peregrina (Walker, 1854)

Synonyms
- Bizone peregrina Walker, 1854; Chionaema peregrina

= Cyana peregrina =

Species of moth

Cyana peregrina is a moth of the family Erebidae. It is found in India (Nilgiris, Coimbatore, Travancore) and Sri Lanka. The habitat consists of forests.

== Description of male ==
It has white palpi and the lower parts of the frons are scarlet. The tegulae are edged with scarlet, scarlet bands across thorax and patagia and on meta-thorax, less scarlet, the fore coxae, mid femora, and hind tibiae and femora are white and the abdomen is tinged with scarlet above except towards the base. Forewings with subbasal scarlet line expanding at costa, an ante-medial line bent inwards to the costa and slightly edged by black on the inner side. There is a postmedial line slightly edged by black on the outer side and bent inwards above vein three. There is a black spot in the upper angle of the cell and two on the discocellulars, and a brownish mark beyond the postmedial line below the costa, a terminal scarlet band running from the apex to the postmedial line. The hindwings have the inner area and termen tinged with scarlet.

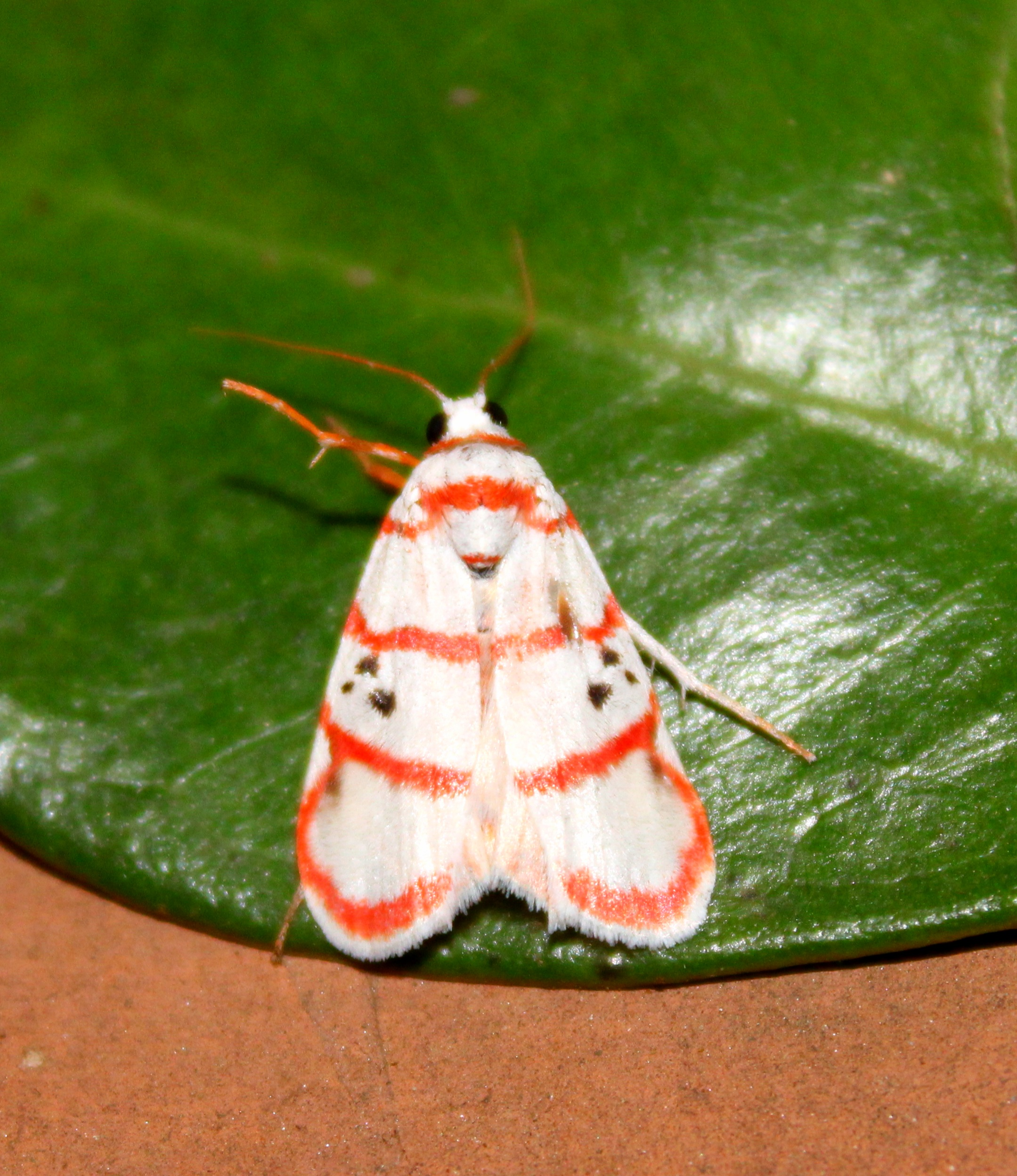
in Sri Lanka

== Description of female ==
Forewings with one black spot at the end of the cell. The black edges to the ante- and postmedial lines are prominent, the latter oblique throughout, the terminal line only running just round the apex. The hindwings are pale crimson, with the cilia white. The underside of the forewing is pale crimson.

== Biology ==
The larvae feed on lichens. Adults have been recorded in the months of December at Periyar, Kerala, India. It is a minor pest on green gram.
