= Cyana alborosea =

Scientific classification
- Kingdom: Animalia
- Phylum: Arthropoda
- Clade: Pancrustacea
- Class: Insecta
- Order: Lepidoptera
- Superfamily: Noctuoidea
- Family: Erebidae
- Subfamily: Arctiinae
- Genus: Cyana
- Species: C. alborosea

Binomial name
- Cyana alborosea (Walker, [1865])

Synonyms
- Lithosia alborosea Walker, [1865]; Bizone quadrinotata Walker, 1869; Bizone pallens Butler, 1877

Species of moth

Cyana alborosea is a moth of the family Erebidae. It was described by Francis Walker in 1865. It is found in China (Hong Kong), India (Sikkim, Assam), Bhutan, Myanmar and on Java.
