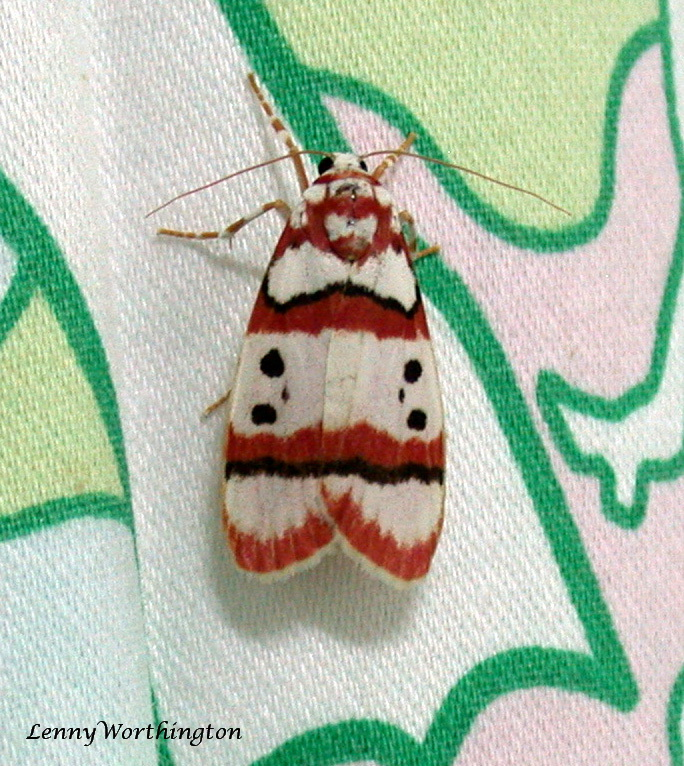

Scientific classification
- Kingdom: Animalia
- Phylum: Arthropoda
- Class: Insecta
- Order: Lepidoptera
- Superfamily: Noctuoidea
- Family: Erebidae
- Subfamily: Arctiinae
- Genus: Cyana
- Species: C. bianca

Binomial name
- Cyana bianca (Walker, 1856)

Synonyms
- Bizone bianca Walker, 1856

= Cyana bianca =

Species of moth

Cyana bianca is a moth species in the subfamily Arctiinae and tribe Lithosiini. It is found from India to Indochina and consists of a species complex.
