= Cyana torrida =

Scientific classification
- Domain: Eukaryota
- Kingdom: Animalia
- Phylum: Arthropoda
- Class: Insecta
- Order: Lepidoptera
- Superfamily: Noctuoidea
- Family: Erebidae
- Subfamily: Arctiinae
- Genus: Cyana
- Species: C. torrida

Binomial name
- Cyana torrida (Holland, 1893)

Synonyms
- Cabarda torrida Holland, 1893

Species of moth

Cyana torrida is a moth of the family Erebidae. It was described by William Jacob Holland in 1893. It is found in Equatorial Guinea.
