= Cyana quentini =

Scientific classification
- Kingdom: Animalia
- Phylum: Arthropoda
- Class: Insecta
- Order: Lepidoptera
- Superfamily: Noctuoidea
- Family: Erebidae
- Subfamily: Arctiinae
- Genus: Cyana
- Species: C. quentini

Binomial name
- Cyana quentini Karisch, 2003

Species of moth

Cyana quentini is a moth of the family Erebidae. It was described by Timm Karisch in 2003 and is endemic to the Democratic Republic of the Congo.
