= Cyana nemasisha =

Scientific classification
- Kingdom: Animalia
- Phylum: Arthropoda
- Class: Insecta
- Order: Lepidoptera
- Superfamily: Noctuoidea
- Family: Erebidae
- Subfamily: Arctiinae
- Genus: Cyana
- Species: C. nemasisha

Binomial name
- Cyana nemasisha Roesler, 1990

Species of moth

Cyana nemasisha is a moth of the family Erebidae. It was described by Roesler in 1990. It is found in Kenya, Mozambique, Rwanda, South Africa, Tanzania, Uganda, Zambia and Zimbabwe.
