= Cyana rubriterminalis =

Scientific classification
- Kingdom: Animalia
- Phylum: Arthropoda
- Class: Insecta
- Order: Lepidoptera
- Superfamily: Noctuoidea
- Family: Erebidae
- Subfamily: Arctiinae
- Genus: Cyana
- Species: C. rubriterminalis

Binomial name
- Cyana rubriterminalis (Strand, 1912)

Synonyms
- Chionaema rubriterminalis Strand, 1912

Species of moth

Cyana rubriterminalis is a moth of the family Erebidae. It was described by Strand in 1912. It is found in Cameroon.
