= Pseudoblabes =

Scientific classification
- Kingdom: Animalia
- Phylum: Arthropoda
- Clade: Pancrustacea
- Class: Insecta
- Order: Lepidoptera
- Superfamily: Noctuoidea
- Family: Erebidae
- Subfamily: Arctiinae
- Subtribe: Cisthenina
- Genus: Pseudoblabes; Zeller, 1853

Genus of moths

Pseudoblabes is a genus of moths in the subfamily Arctiinae first described by Philipp Christoph Zeller in 1853.

== Description ==
Palpi slight and porrect (extending forward). Antennae of male ciliated. Tibia with long spurs. Forewings broad and costa highly arched. Vein 3 arise from close to angle of cell, vein 5 absent. Vein 6 from below upper angle. Vein 7 to 9 stalked and vein 10 absent. Hindwings of male possess a patch of modified scales on the costal vein. Apex excised and veins 3 and 5 absent. Female also absent vein 3. Vein 5 from above angle of cell. Veins 6 and 7 stalked, and vein 8 from middle of cell which is closed. Forewings with a large costal fold in male and small in female.

== Species ==
- Pseudoblabes oophora Zeller, 1853
- Pseudoblabes pseudoblabia (Hampson, 1918)
