= Cyana trigona =

Scientific classification
- Domain: Eukaryota
- Kingdom: Animalia
- Phylum: Arthropoda
- Class: Insecta
- Order: Lepidoptera
- Superfamily: Noctuoidea
- Family: Erebidae
- Subfamily: Arctiinae
- Genus: Cyana
- Species: C. trigona

Binomial name
- Cyana trigona (Rothschild, 1903)

Synonyms
- Clerckia trigona Rothschild, 1903; Chionaema trigona; Chionaema dinawa Bethune-Baker, 1904

Species of moth

Cyana trigona is a moth of the family Erebidae. It was described by Walter Rothschild in 1903. It is found in New Guinea.
