= Cyana brunnea =

Scientific classification
- Domain: Eukaryota
- Kingdom: Animalia
- Phylum: Arthropoda
- Class: Insecta
- Order: Lepidoptera
- Superfamily: Noctuoidea
- Family: Erebidae
- Subfamily: Arctiinae
- Genus: Cyana
- Species: C. brunnea

Binomial name
- Cyana brunnea (Bethune-Baker, 1904)

Synonyms
- Chionaema brunnea Bethune-Baker, 1904

Species of moth

Cyana brunnea is a moth of the family Erebidae. It was described by George Thomas Bethune-Baker in 1904. It is found in Papua New Guinea.
