= Cyana croceizona =

Scientific classification
- Kingdom: Animalia
- Phylum: Arthropoda
- Class: Insecta
- Order: Lepidoptera
- Superfamily: Noctuoidea
- Family: Erebidae
- Subfamily: Arctiinae
- Genus: Cyana
- Species: C. croceizona

Binomial name
- Cyana croceizona (Hampson, 1914)

Synonyms
- Chionaema croceizona Hampson, 1914; Chionaema bicolor Hulstaert, 1924 (preocc. Rothschild, 1913)

Species of moth

Cyana croceizona is a moth of the family Erebidae. It was described by George Hampson in 1914. It is found in Papua New Guinea.
