= Cyana unipunctata =

Scientific classification
- Domain: Eukaryota
- Kingdom: Animalia
- Phylum: Arthropoda
- Class: Insecta
- Order: Lepidoptera
- Superfamily: Noctuoidea
- Family: Erebidae
- Subfamily: Arctiinae
- Genus: Cyana
- Species: C. unipunctata

Binomial name
- Cyana unipunctata (Elwes, 1890)

Synonyms
- Bizone unipunctata Elwes, 1890

Species of moth

Cyana unipunctata is a moth of the family Erebidae. It was described by Henry John Elwes in 1890. It is found in Japan.
