= Scaptesyle fovealis =

Scientific classification
- Kingdom: Animalia
- Phylum: Arthropoda
- Class: Insecta
- Order: Lepidoptera
- Superfamily: Noctuoidea
- Family: Erebidae
- Subfamily: Arctiinae
- Genus: Scaptesyle
- Species: S. fovealis

Binomial name
- Scaptesyle fovealis Hampson, 1903

Species of moth

Scaptesyle fovealis is a moth in the subfamily Arctiinae. It was described by George Hampson in 1903. It is found on New Guinea.
