= Cyana arenbergeri =

Scientific classification
- Kingdom: Animalia
- Phylum: Arthropoda
- Class: Insecta
- Order: Lepidoptera
- Superfamily: Noctuoidea
- Family: Erebidae
- Subfamily: Arctiinae
- Genus: Cyana
- Species: C. arenbergeri

Binomial name
- Cyana arenbergeri Karisch, 2003

Species of moth

Cyana arenbergeri is a moth of the family Erebidae. It was described by Timm Karisch in 2003. It is found in Tanzania.
