= Cyana pallidilinea =

Scientific classification
- Kingdom: Animalia
- Phylum: Arthropoda
- Class: Insecta
- Order: Lepidoptera
- Superfamily: Noctuoidea
- Family: Erebidae
- Subfamily: Arctiinae
- Genus: Cyana
- Species: C. pallidilinea

Binomial name
- Cyana pallidilinea Karisch, 2003

Species of moth

Cyana pallidilinea is a moth of the family Erebidae. It was described by Timm Karisch in 2003. It is found in the Democratic Republic of the Congo.
