= Scaptesyle plumosus =

Scientific classification
- Kingdom: Animalia
- Phylum: Arthropoda
- Class: Insecta
- Order: Lepidoptera
- Superfamily: Noctuoidea
- Family: Erebidae
- Subfamily: Arctiinae
- Genus: Scaptesyle
- Species: S. plumosus

Binomial name
- Scaptesyle plumosus Rothschild, 1912

Synonyms
- Scaptesyle tricolor dentata Talbot, 1926; Scaptosyle plumosus

Species of moth

Scaptesyle plumosus is a moth in the subfamily Arctiinae first described by Rothschild in 1912. It is found on Sumatra, Java, Peninsular Malaysia and Borneo. The habitat consists of coastal areas.

The forewing border is broad, enclosing deep red.
