= Cyana obliquilineata =

Scientific classification
- Kingdom: Animalia
- Phylum: Arthropoda
- Class: Insecta
- Order: Lepidoptera
- Superfamily: Noctuoidea
- Family: Erebidae
- Subfamily: Arctiinae
- Genus: Cyana
- Species: C. obliquilineata

Binomial name
- Cyana obliquilineata (Hampson, 1900)

Synonyms
- Chionaema obliquilineata Hampson, 1900

Species of moth

Cyana obliquilineata is a moth of the family Erebidae. It was described by George Hampson in 1900. It is found in Sikkim, India.
