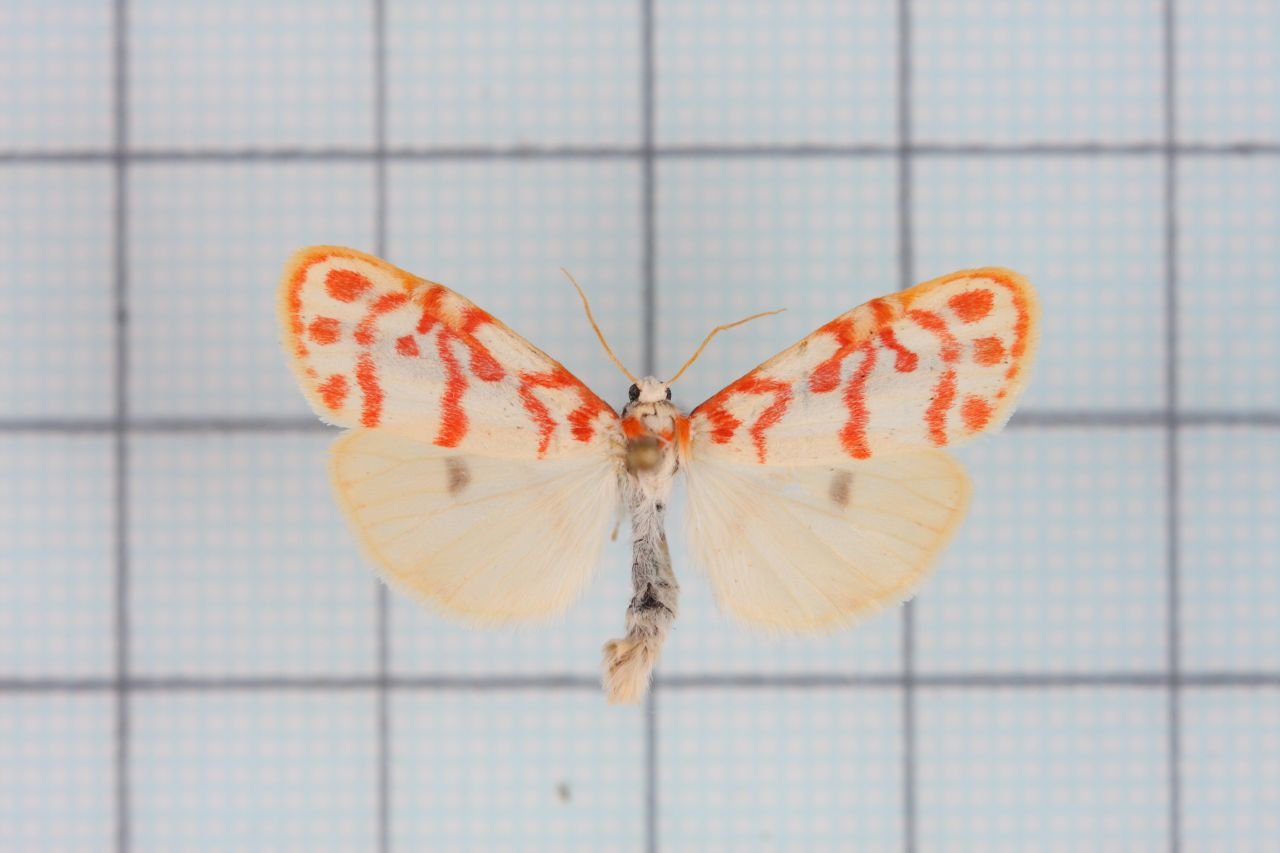
- Cyana effracta posilla

Scientific classification
- Kingdom: Animalia
- Phylum: Arthropoda
- Class: Insecta
- Order: Lepidoptera
- Superfamily: Noctuoidea
- Family: Erebidae
- Subfamily: Arctiinae
- Genus: Cyana
- Species: C. effracta

Binomial name
- Cyana effracta (Walker, 1854)

Synonyms
- Barsine effracta Walker, 1854; Chionaema pusilla Wileman, 1910; Chionaema effracta sumatrana van Eecke, 1927

= Cyana effracta =

Species of moth

Cyana effracta is a moth of the family Erebidae first described by Francis Walker in 1854. It is found in Nepal, the north-eastern Himalayas, Taiwan, China, Burma, Peninsular Malaysia, Sumatra and Borneo.

The wingspan is 22–30 mm.

The larvae possibly feed on Elettaria species.

== Subspecies ==
- Cyana effracta effracta
- Cyana effracta posilla Wileman, 1910 (Taiwan, China, India, Nepal)
