= Cyana flammeostrigata =

Scientific classification
- Domain: Eukaryota
- Kingdom: Animalia
- Phylum: Arthropoda
- Class: Insecta
- Order: Lepidoptera
- Superfamily: Noctuoidea
- Family: Erebidae
- Subfamily: Arctiinae
- Genus: Cyana
- Species: C. flammeostrigata

Binomial name
- Cyana flammeostrigata Karisch, 2003

Species of moth

Cyana flammeostrigata is a moth in the family Erebidae. It was described by Timm Karisch in 2003. It is found in Cameroon, Equatorial Guinea, Kenya, Nigeria and Uganda.
