= Scaptesyle luzonica =

Scientific classification
- Kingdom: Animalia
- Phylum: Arthropoda
- Class: Insecta
- Order: Lepidoptera
- Superfamily: Noctuoidea
- Family: Erebidae
- Subfamily: Arctiinae
- Genus: Scaptesyle
- Species: S. luzonica

Binomial name
- Scaptesyle luzonica Swinhoe, 1916

Species of moth

Scaptesyle luzonica is a moth in the subfamily Arctiinae. It is found in the Philippines (Luzon).
