= Cyana delicata =

Scientific classification
- Kingdom: Animalia
- Phylum: Arthropoda
- Class: Insecta
- Order: Lepidoptera
- Superfamily: Noctuoidea
- Family: Erebidae
- Subfamily: Arctiinae
- Genus: Cyana
- Species: C. delicata

Binomial name
- Cyana delicata (Walker, 1854)

Synonyms
- Bizone delicata Walker, 1854; Cyana shakalesha Roesler, 1990

Species of moth

Cyana delicata is a moth of the family Erebidae. It was described by Francis Walker in 1854. It is found in Angola, the Democratic Republic of the Congo, Ghana, Sierra Leone and Togo.
