= Cyana meyricki =

Scientific classification
- Domain: Eukaryota
- Kingdom: Animalia
- Phylum: Arthropoda
- Class: Insecta
- Order: Lepidoptera
- Superfamily: Noctuoidea
- Family: Erebidae
- Subfamily: Arctiinae
- Genus: Cyana
- Species: C. meyricki

Binomial name
- Cyana meyricki (Rothschild & Jordan, 1901)

Synonyms
- Clerckia meyricki Rothschild, 1901; Chionaema meyricci Hampson, 1914

Species of moth

Cyana meyricki is a moth of the family Erebidae first described by Walter Rothschild and Karl Jordan in 1901. It is found in Australia, where it has been recorded from Queensland and New South Wales.

The wingspan is about 30 mm (1.2 in).
