= Scaptesyle dictyota =

Scientific classification
- Kingdom: Animalia
- Phylum: Arthropoda
- Class: Insecta
- Order: Lepidoptera
- Superfamily: Noctuoidea
- Family: Erebidae
- Subfamily: Arctiinae
- Genus: Scaptesyle
- Species: S. dictyota

Binomial name
- Scaptesyle dictyota (Meyrick, 1886)

Synonyms
- Chiriphe dictyota Meyrick, 1886

Species of moth

Scaptesyle dictyota is a moth in the subfamily Arctiinae. It was described by Edward Meyrick in 1886. It is found in Queensland, Australia.
