= Scaptesyle violinitens =

Scientific classification
- Kingdom: Animalia
- Phylum: Arthropoda
- Class: Insecta
- Order: Lepidoptera
- Superfamily: Noctuoidea
- Family: Erebidae
- Subfamily: Arctiinae
- Genus: Scaptesyle
- Species: S. violinitens

Binomial name
- Scaptesyle violinitens (Rothschild, 1912)

Synonyms
- Padenodes violinitens Rothschild, 1912

Species of moth

Scaptesyle violinitens is a moth in the subfamily Arctiinae. It is found in New Guinea.
