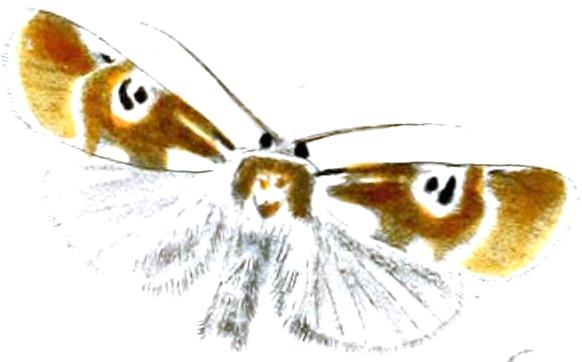

Scientific classification
- Domain: Eukaryota
- Kingdom: Animalia
- Phylum: Arthropoda
- Class: Insecta
- Order: Lepidoptera
- Superfamily: Noctuoidea
- Family: Erebidae
- Subfamily: Arctiinae
- Genus: Cyana
- Species: C. divakara

Binomial name
- Cyana divakara (Moore, [1866])

Synonyms
- Bizone divakara Moore, [1866]

= Cyana divakara =

Species of moth

Cyana divakara is a species of moth of the family Erebidae first described by Frederic Moore in 1866. It is found in India (including Sikkim).
