= Cyana capensis =

Scientific classification
- Kingdom: Animalia
- Phylum: Arthropoda
- Class: Insecta
- Order: Lepidoptera
- Superfamily: Noctuoidea
- Family: Erebidae
- Subfamily: Arctiinae
- Genus: Cyana
- Species: C. capensis

Binomial name
- Cyana capensis (Hampson, 1903)

Synonyms
- Chionaema capensis Hampson, 1903

Species of moth

Cyana capensis is a moth of the family Erebidae. It was described by George Hampson in 1903. It is found in South Africa.
