= Cyana metamelas =

Scientific classification
- Kingdom: Animalia
- Phylum: Arthropoda
- Clade: Pancrustacea
- Class: Insecta
- Order: Lepidoptera
- Superfamily: Noctuoidea
- Family: Erebidae
- Subfamily: Arctiinae
- Genus: Cyana
- Species: C. metamelas

Binomial name
- Cyana metamelas (Hampson, 1914)

Synonyms
- Chionaema metamelas Hampson, 1914

Species of moth

Cyana metamelas is a moth of the family Erebidae. It was described by George Hampson in 1914. It is found in New Guinea.
