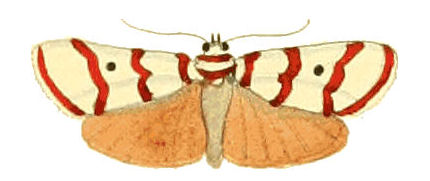

Scientific classification
- Domain: Eukaryota
- Kingdom: Animalia
- Phylum: Arthropoda
- Class: Insecta
- Order: Lepidoptera
- Superfamily: Noctuoidea
- Family: Erebidae
- Subfamily: Arctiinae
- Genus: Cyana
- Species: C. puella

Binomial name
- Cyana puella (Drury, 1773)

Synonyms
- Phalaena puella Drury, 1773; Chionaema puella; Chionaema fugax Berio, 1939

= Cyana puella =

Species of moth

Cyana puella is a moth of the family Erebidae. It is found in the north-western Himalayas, Nepal, India (Maharashtra, Bombay, Nilgiris), Sri Lanka, Madagascar, Kenya and Eritrea.

== Description of male ==
White, although the palpi, antennae, a border to tegulae, a band across thorax and patagia, and a spot on the metathorax are scarlet. The legs are scarlet and white. The abdomen is dorsally tinged with crimson except towards the base. Forewings with scarlet sub-basal band expanding into a streak on costa. There is an ante-medial band with a fine black line on its inner edge and strongly excurved below the costa and a sinuous and incurved postmedial band with a black line on its outer side. There is also a black spot in end of the cell, two on the disco-cellulars, and a short black or scarlet streak beyond the postmedial line below the costa. There is a terminal band running round the apex to the postmedial band. The hindwings are pale crimson.

== Description of female ==
The forewings have one discoidal black spot and the terminal band is not running round the apex.

== Biology ==
The larvae probably feed on lichens. Adults have been recorded in the month of May at Matheran, Maharashtra, India.

== Subspecies ==
- Cyana puella puella
- Cyana puella postflavida Rothschild, 1924 (Kenya and Eritrea)
