= Cyana rubritermina =

Scientific classification
- Kingdom: Animalia
- Phylum: Arthropoda
- Class: Insecta
- Order: Lepidoptera
- Superfamily: Noctuoidea
- Family: Erebidae
- Subfamily: Arctiinae
- Genus: Cyana
- Species: C. rubritermina

Binomial name
- Cyana rubritermina (Bethune-Baker, 1911)

Synonyms
- Chionaema rubritermina Bethune-Baker, 1911

Species of moth

Cyana rubritermina is a moth of the family Erebidae. It was described by George Thomas Bethune-Baker in 1911. It is found in Ghana and Nigeria.
