= Cyana rubrifasciata =

Scientific classification
- Domain: Eukaryota
- Kingdom: Animalia
- Phylum: Arthropoda
- Class: Insecta
- Order: Lepidoptera
- Superfamily: Noctuoidea
- Family: Erebidae
- Subfamily: Arctiinae
- Genus: Cyana
- Species: C. rubrifasciata

Binomial name
- Cyana rubrifasciata (H. Druce, 1883)

Synonyms
- Bizone rubrifasciata H. Druce, 1883

Species of moth

Cyana rubrifasciata is a moth of the family Erebidae. It was described by Herbert Druce in 1883. It is found on Sulawesi in Indonesia.
