= Cyana obscura =

Scientific classification
- Kingdom: Animalia
- Phylum: Arthropoda
- Class: Insecta
- Order: Lepidoptera
- Superfamily: Noctuoidea
- Family: Erebidae
- Subfamily: Arctiinae
- Genus: Cyana
- Species: C. obscura

Binomial name
- Cyana obscura (Hampson, 1900)

Synonyms
- Chionaema obscura Hampson, 1900; Neobrocha phaeocyma Meyrick, 1886

Species of moth

Cyana obscura is a moth of the family Erebidae first described by George Hampson in 1900. It is found in Australia, where it has been recorded from Queensland.
