= Scaptesyle middletoni =

Scientific classification
- Kingdom: Animalia
- Phylum: Arthropoda
- Class: Insecta
- Order: Lepidoptera
- Superfamily: Noctuoidea
- Family: Erebidae
- Subfamily: Arctiinae
- Genus: Scaptesyle
- Species: S. middletoni

Binomial name
- Scaptesyle middletoni (Turner, 1941)

Synonyms
- Eutane middletoni Turner, 1941

Species of moth

Scaptesyle middletoni is a moth in the subfamily Arctiinae. It was described by Turner in 1941. It is found in Australia.
