= Cyana adelina =

Scientific classification
- Domain: Eukaryota
- Kingdom: Animalia
- Phylum: Arthropoda
- Class: Insecta
- Order: Lepidoptera
- Superfamily: Noctuoidea
- Family: Erebidae
- Subfamily: Arctiinae
- Genus: Cyana
- Species: C. adelina

Binomial name
- Cyana adelina (Staudinger, 1887)

Synonyms
- Bizone adelina Staudinger, 1887

Species of moth

Cyana adelina is a moth of the family Erebidae. It was described by Otto Staudinger in 1887. It is found in the Russian Far East (southern Primorye), Korea and north-eastern China.
