= Scaptesyle thestias =

Scientific classification
- Kingdom: Animalia
- Phylum: Arthropoda
- Class: Insecta
- Order: Lepidoptera
- Superfamily: Noctuoidea
- Family: Erebidae
- Subfamily: Arctiinae
- Genus: Scaptesyle
- Species: S. thestias

Binomial name
- Scaptesyle thestias Snellen, 1904

Species of moth

Scaptesyle thestias is a moth in the subfamily Arctiinae. It is found on Java.
