= Cyana saalmuelleri =

Scientific classification
- Kingdom: Animalia
- Phylum: Arthropoda
- Class: Insecta
- Order: Lepidoptera
- Superfamily: Noctuoidea
- Family: Erebidae
- Subfamily: Arctiinae
- Genus: Cyana
- Species: C. saalmuelleri

Binomial name
- Cyana saalmuelleri (Butler, 1882)

Synonyms
- Bizone saalmuelleri Butler, 1882; Chionaema pauliani Toulgoët, 1954; Chionaema suberythraea Toulgoët, 1971; Chionaema saalmuelleri Hampson, 1900

Species of moth

Cyana saalmuelleri is a moth of the family Erebidae first described by Arthur Gardiner Butler in 1882. It is found on Madagascar.

This species is white, with two transversal red lines on the forewings. The wingspan is 48–50 millimetres (1.9–2.0 in).

== Subspecies ==
- Cyana saalmuelleri saalmuelleri (Butler, 1882)
- Cyana saalmuelleri pauliani (Toulgoët, 1954)
