= Cyana subornata =

Scientific classification
- Kingdom: Animalia
- Phylum: Arthropoda
- Class: Insecta
- Order: Lepidoptera
- Superfamily: Noctuoidea
- Family: Erebidae
- Subfamily: Arctiinae
- Genus: Cyana
- Species: C. subornata

Binomial name
- Cyana subornata (Walker, 1854)

Synonyms
- Bizone subornata Walker, 1854; Bizone linatula Swinhoe, 1891; Bizone subornata Moore, 1882; Chionaema subornata Hampson, 1900; Cyana subornata Arora, 1983

Species of moth

Cyana subornata is a moth of the family Erebidae first described by Francis Walker in 1854. It is found in India, Borneo and Sri Lanka.

== Description ==
It has a wingspan of 36 mm. It is characterized by three black spots on its forewings in curved appearance in both sexes. Forewings with the single underside lobe and bands without black edges. Terminal band is not dentate.
