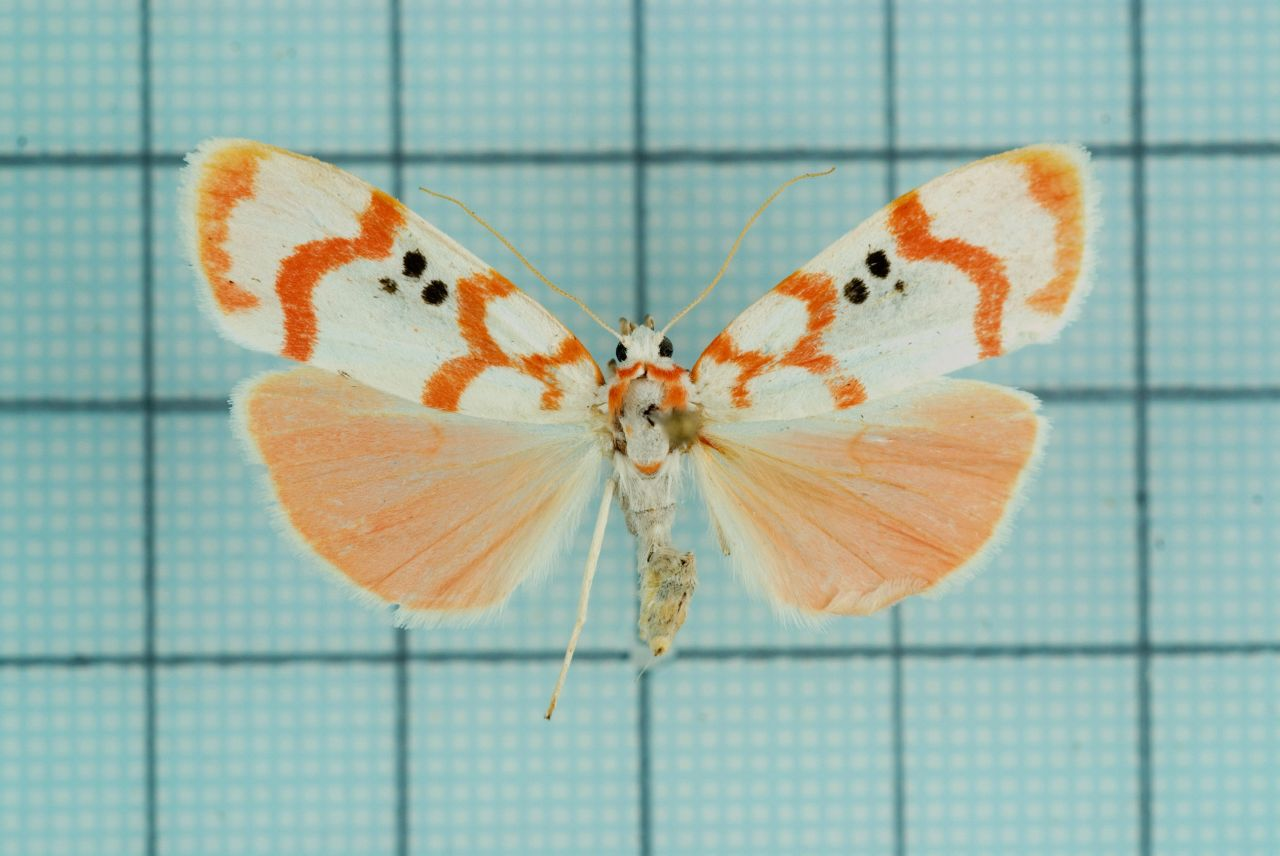

Scientific classification
- Kingdom: Animalia
- Phylum: Arthropoda
- Class: Insecta
- Order: Lepidoptera
- Superfamily: Noctuoidea
- Family: Erebidae
- Subfamily: Arctiinae
- Genus: Cyana
- Species: C. formosana

Binomial name
- Cyana formosana (Hampson, 1909)

Synonyms
- Chionaema formosana Hampson, 1909

= Cyana formosana =

Species of moth

Cyana formosana is a moth of the family Erebidae first described by George Hampson in 1909. It is found in Taiwan.

The wingspan is 31–43 mm. Adults are on wing in May.
