= Cyana margarethae =

Scientific classification
- Domain: Eukaryota
- Kingdom: Animalia
- Phylum: Arthropoda
- Class: Insecta
- Order: Lepidoptera
- Superfamily: Noctuoidea
- Family: Erebidae
- Subfamily: Arctiinae
- Genus: Cyana
- Species: C. margarethae

Binomial name
- Cyana margarethae (Kiriakoff, 1958)

Synonyms
- Chionaema margarethae Kiriakoff, 1958

Species of moth

Cyana margarethae is a moth of the family Erebidae. It was described by Sergius G. Kiriakoff in 1958. It is found in Kenya and Uganda.
