= Cyana asticta =

Scientific classification
- Kingdom: Animalia
- Phylum: Arthropoda
- Class: Insecta
- Order: Lepidoptera
- Superfamily: Noctuoidea
- Family: Erebidae
- Subfamily: Arctiinae
- Genus: Cyana
- Species: C. asticta

Binomial name
- Cyana asticta (Hampson, 1909)

Synonyms
- Chionaema asticta Hampson, 1909

Species of moth

Cyana asticta is a moth of the family Erebidae. It was described by George Hampson in 1909. It is found in Australia.
