= Cyana transfasciata =

Scientific classification
- Domain: Eukaryota
- Kingdom: Animalia
- Phylum: Arthropoda
- Class: Insecta
- Order: Lepidoptera
- Superfamily: Noctuoidea
- Family: Erebidae
- Subfamily: Arctiinae
- Genus: Cyana
- Species: C. transfasciata

Binomial name
- Cyana transfasciata (Rothschild, 1912)

Synonyms
- Ilema transfasciata Rothschild, 1912; Chionaema transfasciata

Species of moth

Cyana transfasciata is a moth of the family Erebidae. It was described by Walter Rothschild in 1912. It is found in New Guinea.
