= Scaptesyle bipartita =

Scientific classification
- Kingdom: Animalia
- Phylum: Arthropoda
- Class: Insecta
- Order: Lepidoptera
- Superfamily: Noctuoidea
- Family: Erebidae
- Subfamily: Arctiinae
- Genus: Scaptesyle
- Species: S. bipartita

Binomial name
- Scaptesyle bipartita (Rothschild, 1913)

Synonyms
- Chrysallactis bipartita Rothschild, 1913

Species of moth

Scaptesyle bipartita is a moth in the subfamily Arctiinae. It was described by Rothschild in 1913. It is found in New Guinea.
