= Cyana thoracica =

Scientific classification
- Domain: Eukaryota
- Kingdom: Animalia
- Phylum: Arthropoda
- Class: Insecta
- Order: Lepidoptera
- Superfamily: Noctuoidea
- Family: Erebidae
- Subfamily: Arctiinae
- Genus: Cyana
- Species: C. thoracica

Binomial name
- Cyana thoracica (Rothschild & Jordan, 1912)

Synonyms
- Clerckia thoracica Rothschild & Jordan, 1912; Chionaema thoracica

Species of moth

Cyana thoracica is a moth of the family Erebidae. It was described by Walter Rothschild and Karl Jordan in 1912. It is found in New Guinea.
