= Scaptesyle tetramita =

Scientific classification
- Kingdom: Animalia
- Phylum: Arthropoda
- Class: Insecta
- Order: Lepidoptera
- Superfamily: Noctuoidea
- Family: Erebidae
- Subfamily: Arctiinae
- Genus: Scaptesyle
- Species: S. tetramita

Binomial name
- Scaptesyle tetramita Turner, 1940

Species of moth

Scaptesyle tetramita is a moth in the subfamily Arctiinae first described by Alfred Jefferis Turner in 1940. It is found in Australia.
