= Scaptesyle equidistans =

Scientific classification
- Kingdom: Animalia
- Phylum: Arthropoda
- Class: Insecta
- Order: Lepidoptera
- Superfamily: Noctuoidea
- Family: Erebidae
- Subfamily: Arctiinae
- Genus: Scaptesyle
- Species: S. equidistans

Binomial name
- Scaptesyle equidistans (T. P. Lucas, 1890)

Synonyms
- Comarchis equidistans T. P. Lucas, 1890

Species of moth

Scaptesyle equidistans is a moth in the subfamily Arctiinae. It was described by Thomas Pennington Lucas in 1890. It is found in Australia, where it has been recorded from Queensland and New South Wales.
