= Cyana rufeola =

Scientific classification
- Kingdom: Animalia
- Phylum: Arthropoda
- Class: Insecta
- Order: Lepidoptera
- Superfamily: Noctuoidea
- Family: Erebidae
- Subfamily: Arctiinae
- Genus: Cyana
- Species: C. rufeola

Binomial name
- Cyana rufeola Karisch & Dall'Asta, 2010

Species of moth

Cyana rufeola is a moth of the family Erebidae. It was described by Timm Karisch and Ugo Dall'Asta in 2010. It is found in Cameroon, the Central African Republic and the Democratic Republic of the Congo.
