= Pseudoblabes oophora =

Scientific classification
- Kingdom: Animalia
- Phylum: Arthropoda
- Clade: Pancrustacea
- Class: Insecta
- Order: Lepidoptera
- Superfamily: Noctuoidea
- Family: Erebidae
- Subfamily: Arctiinae
- Genus: Pseudoblabes
- Species: P. oophora

Binomial name
- Pseudoblabes oophora Zeller, 1853

Synonyms
- Conchylis flavicostana Walker, 1863

Species of moth

Pseudoblabes oophora is a moth in the subfamily Arctiinae. It was described by Philipp Christoph Zeller in 1853. It is found in Assam in India, Sri Lanka, Myanmar, on Java and in Singapore.

== Description ==
In the male, the head and thorax are yellowish white. Forewings dark greyish, whereas basal, costal, outer areas yellowish white. The costal band expanding into a patch at the center. Hindwings ochreous. Marginal area slightly suffused with fuscous. In female, hindwings are fuscous with yellow cilia.
