= Cyana pretoriae =

Scientific classification
- Kingdom: Animalia
- Phylum: Arthropoda
- Class: Insecta
- Order: Lepidoptera
- Superfamily: Noctuoidea
- Family: Erebidae
- Subfamily: Arctiinae
- Genus: Cyana
- Species: C. pretoriae

Binomial name
- Cyana pretoriae (Distant, 1897)

Synonyms
- Bizone pretoriae Distant, 1897

Species of moth

Cyana pretoriae is a moth of the family Erebidae. It was described by William Lucas Distant in 1897. It is found in the Democratic Republic of the Congo, Kenya, Lesotho, Malawi, Mozambique, Somalia, South Africa, Tanzania, Uganda, Zambia and Zimbabwe.

== Subspecies ==
- Cyana pretoriae pretoriae
- Cyana pretoriae spectabilis Karisch & Dall'Asta, 2010 (Democratic Republic of the Congo)
