= Cyana heidrunae =

Scientific classification
- Kingdom: Animalia
- Phylum: Arthropoda
- Clade: Pancrustacea
- Class: Insecta
- Order: Lepidoptera
- Superfamily: Noctuoidea
- Family: Erebidae
- Subfamily: Arctiinae
- Genus: Cyana
- Species: C. heidrunae

Binomial name
- Cyana heidrunae (Hoppe, 2004)

Synonyms
- Isine heidrunae Hoppe, 2004

Species of moth

Cyana heidrunae is a moth of the family Erebidae first described by Henri Hoppe in 2004. It is found on Bioko, an island off the west coast of Africa.
