= Scaptesyle monogrammaria =

Scientific classification
- Kingdom: Animalia
- Phylum: Arthropoda
- Class: Insecta
- Order: Lepidoptera
- Superfamily: Noctuoidea
- Family: Erebidae
- Subfamily: Arctiinae
- Genus: Scaptesyle
- Species: S. monogrammaria

Binomial name
- Scaptesyle monogrammaria (Walker, [1863])

Synonyms
- Chiriphe monogrammaria Walker, [1863]

Species of moth

Scaptesyle monogrammaria is a moth in the subfamily Arctiinae first described by Francis Walker in 1863. It is found in Australia.
