= Cyana detrita =

Scientific classification
- Domain: Eukaryota
- Kingdom: Animalia
- Phylum: Arthropoda
- Class: Insecta
- Order: Lepidoptera
- Superfamily: Noctuoidea
- Family: Erebidae
- Subfamily: Arctiinae
- Genus: Cyana
- Species: C. detrita

Binomial name
- Cyana detrita Walker, 1854

Synonyms
- Barsine suffundens Walker, [1865]

Species of moth

Cyana detrita is a moth of the family Erebidae first described by Francis Walker in 1854. The male has a wingspan of 15 mm and the female's is 19 mm.

== Distribution ==
It is distributed throughout the countries of India, Sri Lanka, China, Myanmar, Sumatra, Borneo, Java and parts of Africa.
