= Scaptesyle bifasciata =

Scientific classification
- Kingdom: Animalia
- Phylum: Arthropoda
- Class: Insecta
- Order: Lepidoptera
- Superfamily: Noctuoidea
- Family: Erebidae
- Subfamily: Arctiinae
- Genus: Scaptesyle
- Species: S. bifasciata

Binomial name
- Scaptesyle bifasciata Snellen, 1904

Species of moth

Scaptesyle bifasciata is a moth in the subfamily Arctiinae. It was described by Snellen in 1904. It is found on Java.
