= Cyana catorhoda =

Scientific classification
- Kingdom: Animalia
- Phylum: Arthropoda
- Class: Insecta
- Order: Lepidoptera
- Superfamily: Noctuoidea
- Family: Erebidae
- Subfamily: Arctiinae
- Genus: Cyana
- Species: C. catorhoda

Binomial name
- Cyana catorhoda Hampson, 1897

Species of moth

Cyana catorhoda is a moth of the family Erebidae. It was described by George Hampson in 1897. It is found in Assam in India and in Myanmar.
