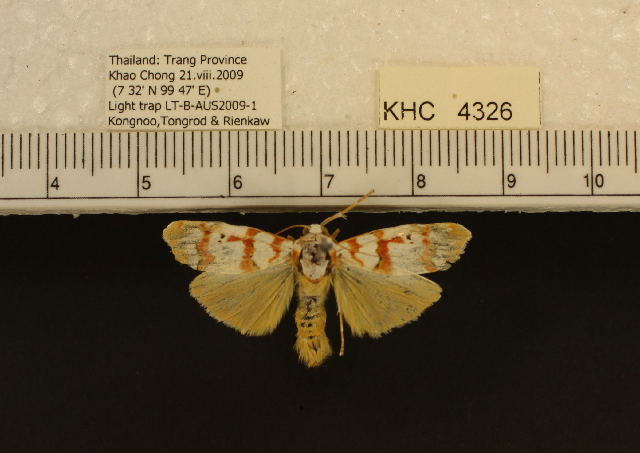

Scientific classification
- Kingdom: Animalia
- Phylum: Arthropoda
- Class: Insecta
- Order: Lepidoptera
- Superfamily: Noctuoidea
- Family: Erebidae
- Subfamily: Arctiinae
- Genus: Cyana
- Species: C. conclusa

Binomial name
- Cyana conclusa (Walker, 1862)

Synonyms
- Bizone conclusa Walker, 1862; Chionaema conclusa

= Cyana conclusa =

Species of moth

Cyana conclusa is a moth of the subfamily Arctiinae. It was described by Francis Walker in 1862. It is found on Borneo and Sumatra. The habitat consists of lowland forest types, excluding heath forests.
