= Cyana nyasica =

Scientific classification
- Kingdom: Animalia
- Phylum: Arthropoda
- Class: Insecta
- Order: Lepidoptera
- Superfamily: Noctuoidea
- Family: Erebidae
- Subfamily: Arctiinae
- Genus: Cyana
- Species: C. nyasica

Binomial name
- Cyana nyasica (Hampson, 1918)

Synonyms
- Chionaema nyasica Hampson, 1918

Species of moth

Cyana nyasica is a moth of the family Erebidae. It was described by George Hampson in 1918. It is found in Malawi and South Africa. There are two subspecies:

- C. n. nyasica (Hampson, 1918), found in Malawi
- C. n. kruegeri Karisch, 2013, found in South Africa
