= Cyana tripuncta =

Scientific classification
- Kingdom: Animalia
- Phylum: Arthropoda
- Class: Insecta
- Order: Lepidoptera
- Superfamily: Noctuoidea
- Family: Erebidae
- Subfamily: Arctiinae
- Genus: Cyana
- Species: C. tripuncta

Binomial name
- Cyana tripuncta (Toulgoët, 1980)

Synonyms
- Chionaema tripuncta Toulgoët, 1980

Species of moth

Cyana tripuncta is a moth of the family Erebidae. It was described by Hervé de Toulgoët in 1980. It is found on Grande Comore in the Comoros in the Indian Ocean.
