= Cyana rufifrons =

Scientific classification
- Domain: Eukaryota
- Kingdom: Animalia
- Phylum: Arthropoda
- Class: Insecta
- Order: Lepidoptera
- Superfamily: Noctuoidea
- Family: Erebidae
- Subfamily: Arctiinae
- Genus: Cyana
- Species: C. rufifrons

Binomial name
- Cyana rufifrons (Rothschild, 1912)

Synonyms
- Chionaema rufifrons Rothschild, 1912

Species of moth

Cyana rufifrons is a species of moth of the family Erebidae. It was described by Walter Rothschild in 1912. It is found on São Tomé Island.
