= Scaptesyle subtricolor =

Scientific classification
- Kingdom: Animalia
- Phylum: Arthropoda
- Class: Insecta
- Order: Lepidoptera
- Superfamily: Noctuoidea
- Family: Erebidae
- Subfamily: Arctiinae
- Genus: Scaptesyle
- Species: S. subtricolor

Binomial name
- Scaptesyle subtricolor van Eecke, 1927

Species of moth

Scaptesyle subtricolor is a moth in the subfamily Arctiinae. It is found on Sumatra.
