= Scaptesyle ixias =

Scientific classification
- Kingdom: Animalia
- Phylum: Arthropoda
- Class: Insecta
- Order: Lepidoptera
- Superfamily: Noctuoidea
- Family: Erebidae
- Subfamily: Arctiinae
- Genus: Scaptesyle
- Species: S. ixias

Binomial name
- Scaptesyle ixias Hampson, 1900

Species of moth

Scaptesyle ixias is a moth in the subfamily Arctiinae first described by George Hampson in 1900. It is found on the Indonesian islands of Nias and Java.
