= Cyana pellucida =

Scientific classification
- Domain: Eukaryota
- Kingdom: Animalia
- Phylum: Arthropoda
- Class: Insecta
- Order: Lepidoptera
- Superfamily: Noctuoidea
- Family: Erebidae
- Subfamily: Arctiinae
- Genus: Cyana
- Species: C. pellucida

Binomial name
- Cyana pellucida (Rothschild, 1936)

Synonyms
- Chionaema pellucida Rothschild, 1936; Kailasha pellucida (Rothschild, 1936)

Species of moth

Cyana pellucida is a moth of the family Erebidae. It was described by Walter Rothschild in 1936. It is found on Java in Indonesia.
