= Cyana punctistrigosa =

Scientific classification
- Domain: Eukaryota
- Kingdom: Animalia
- Phylum: Arthropoda
- Class: Insecta
- Order: Lepidoptera
- Superfamily: Noctuoidea
- Family: Erebidae
- Subfamily: Arctiinae
- Genus: Cyana
- Species: C. punctistrigosa

Binomial name
- Cyana punctistrigosa (Rothschild, 1913)

Synonyms
- Chionaema punctistrigosa Rothschild, 1913

Species of moth

Cyana punctistrigosa is a moth of the family Erebidae. It was described by Walter Rothschild in 1913. It is found in New Guinea.
