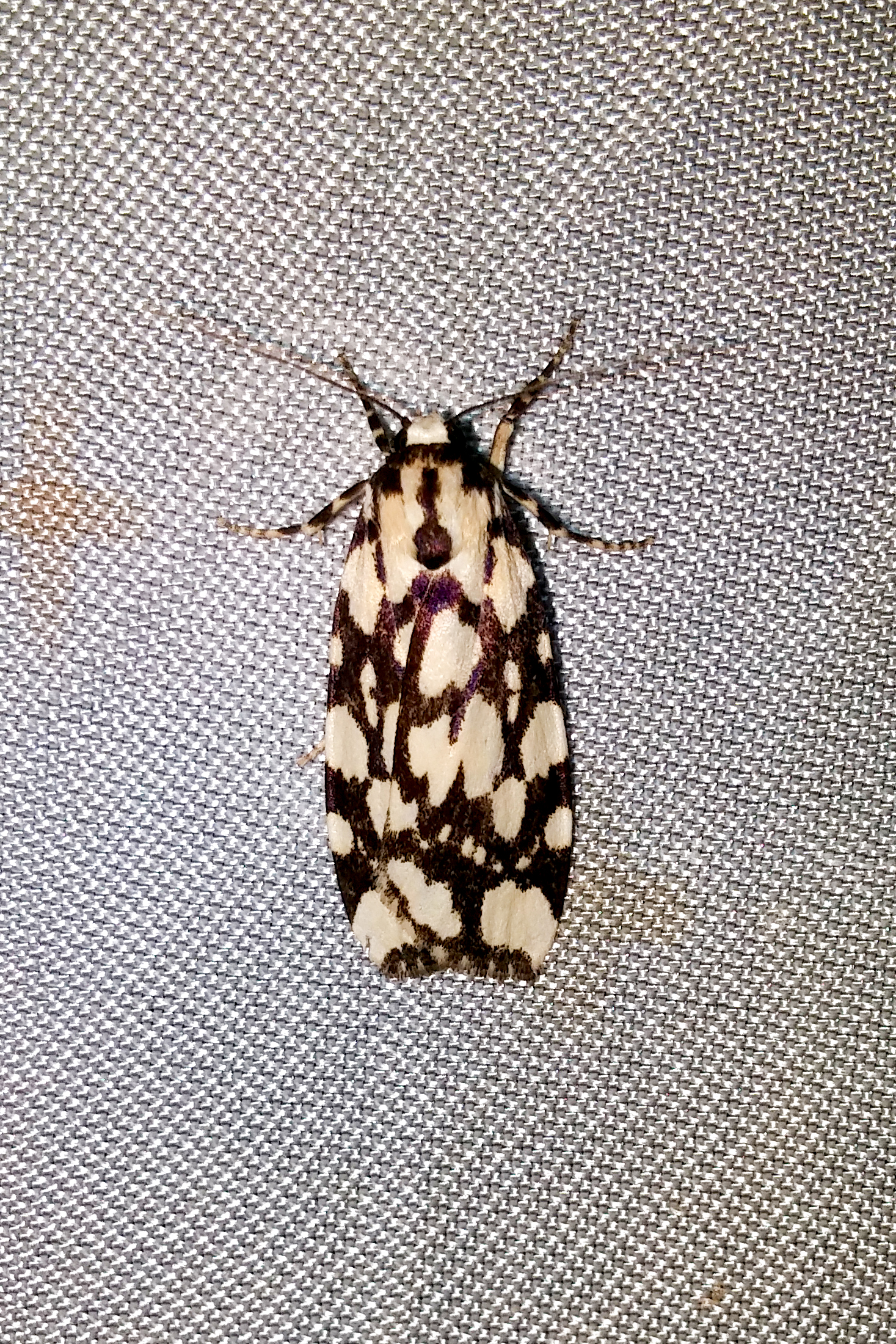
- Cyana nigroplagata

Scientific classification
- Domain: Eukaryota
- Kingdom: Animalia
- Phylum: Arthropoda
- Class: Insecta
- Order: Lepidoptera
- Superfamily: Noctuoidea
- Family: Erebidae
- Subfamily: Arctiinae
- Genus: Cyana
- Species: C. nigroplagata

Binomial name
- Cyana nigroplagata (Bethune-Baker, 1910)

Synonyms
- Chionaema nigroplagata Bethune-Baker, 1910; Scaptesyle aroa Bethune-Baker, 1904

= Cyana nigroplagata =

Species of moth

Cyana nigroplagata is a moth of the family Erebidae. It was described by George Thomas Bethune-Baker in 1910. It is found in New Guinea.
