= Pseudoblabes pseudoblabia =

Scientific classification
- Kingdom: Animalia
- Phylum: Arthropoda
- Class: Insecta
- Order: Lepidoptera
- Superfamily: Noctuoidea
- Family: Erebidae
- Subfamily: Arctiinae
- Genus: Pseudoblabes
- Species: P. pseudoblabia

Binomial name
- Pseudoblabes pseudoblabia (Hampson, 1918)

Synonyms
- Scaptesyle pseudoblabia Hampson, 1918

Species of moth

Pseudoblabes pseudoblabia is a moth in the subfamily Arctiinae. It was described by George Hampson in 1918. It is found in the Philippines.
