= Scaptesyle tricolor =

Scientific classification
- Kingdom: Animalia
- Phylum: Arthropoda
- Class: Insecta
- Order: Lepidoptera
- Superfamily: Noctuoidea
- Family: Erebidae
- Subfamily: Arctiinae
- Genus: Scaptesyle
- Species: S. tricolor

Binomial name
- Scaptesyle tricolor Walker, 1854

Species of moth

Scaptesyle tricolor is a moth in the subfamily Arctiinae first described by Francis Walker in 1854. It is found in the Indian state of Assam and possibly Myanmar.
