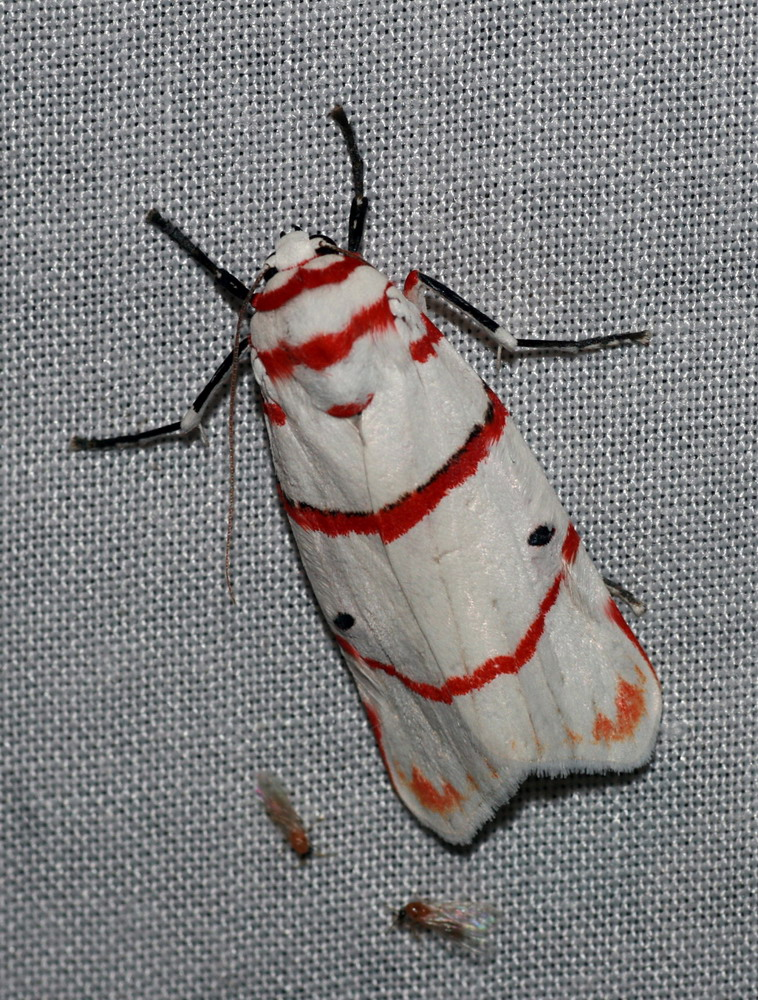
- Cyana perornata

Scientific classification
- Kingdom: Animalia
- Phylum: Arthropoda
- Class: Insecta
- Order: Lepidoptera
- Superfamily: Noctuoidea
- Family: Erebidae
- Subfamily: Arctiinae
- Subtribe: Nudariina
- Genus: Cyana; Walker, 1854

Synonyms
- List: Doliche Walker, 1854; Isine Walker, 1854; Bizone Walker, 1854; Chionaema Herrich-Schäffer, [1855]; Clerckia Aurivillius, 1882; Exotrocha Meyrick, 1886; Neobrocha Meyrick, 1886; Sphragidium Butler, 1887; Gnophrioides Heylaerts, 1891; Leptothrix Heylaerts, 1892; Macronola Kirby, 1892; Lexis Wallengren, 1863

= Cyana =

Genus of moths

Cyana is a genus of moths in the family Erebidae. Species are well distributed in Africa, Madagascar, China, India, Sri Lanka, Myanmar, Sumatra, Java and Borneo. The genus was erected by Francis Walker in 1854.

== Description ==
Palpi slender and upturned. Antennae ciliated. Forewing of the male with a more or less strongly developed fringe of hair from the centre of costa on upperside and lobe on underside, which much distorts the sub-costal nervures. Vein 5 absent in male. Vein 6 usually absent in female. Veins 7 to 9 stalked. Hindwing with veins 3 and stalked. Vein 5 above angle of cell and veins 6 and 7 usually stalked.

The pupae of this genus are typically attached to plant surfaces and surrounded by a characteristic trellis of hairs (see figure).

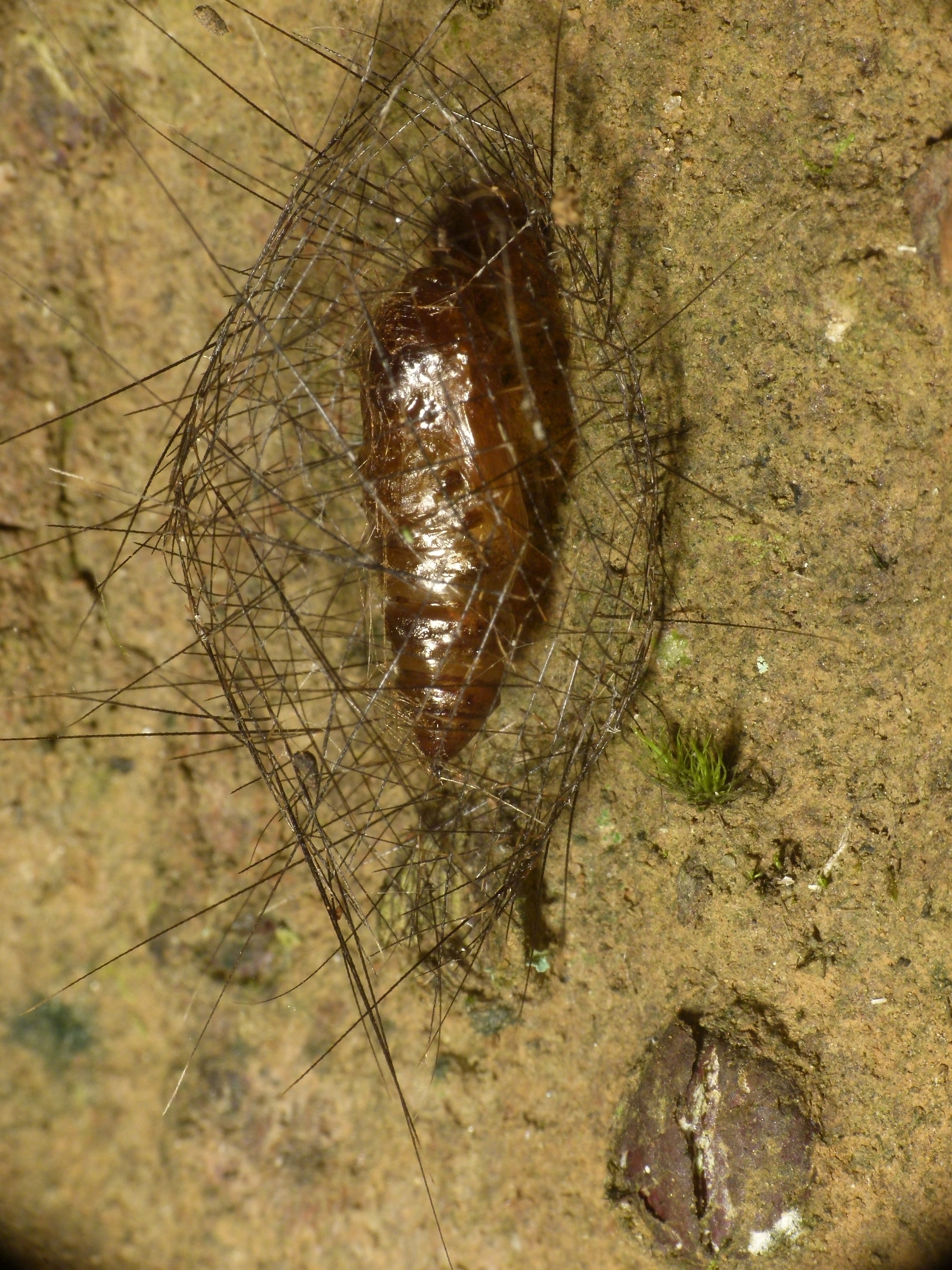
characteristic pupa

== Species ==
The following are included in BioLib.cz:

1. Cyana aarviki Karisch, 2013
2. Cyana aberrans Karisch, 2013
3. Cyana abyssinica Karisch, 2003
4. Cyana adelina (Staudinger, 1887)
5. Cyana adita (Moore, 1859)
6. Cyana africana (Holland, 1893)
7. Cyana alba (Moore, 1878)
8. Cyana alborosea (Walker, 1865)
9. Cyana alexi (Cerny, 1993)
10. Cyana amabilis (Moore, 1877)
11. Cyana amatura (Walker, 1863)
12. Cyana andromeda (Cerny, 1993)
13. Cyana arama (Moore, 1859)
14. Cyana arenbergeri Karisch, 2003
15. Cyana aroa (Bethune-Baker, 1904)
16. Cyana arorai Volynkin et al., 2020
17. Cyana asticta (Hampson, 1909)
18. Cyana atlanteia N. Singh et al., 2020
19. Cyana aurifinis (Cerny, 1993)
20. Cyana aurorae Lourens, 2011
21. Cyana barbora Volynkin & Saldaitis, 2020
22. Cyana basialba (Rothschild, 1913)
23. Cyana basisticta (Hampson, 1914)
24. Cyana bella Kishida, 1991
25. Cyana bellissima (Moore, 1878)
26. Cyana bianca (Walker, 1856)
27. Cyana bicolor (Rothschild, 1913)
28. Cyana bigutta (Karisch, 2005)
29. Cyana boetonensis (Jurriaanse & Lindemans, 1920)
30. Cyana britomartis N. Singh & Volynkin, 2020
31. Cyana brunnea (Bethune-Baker, 1904)
32. Cyana capensis (Hampson, 1903)
33. Cyana cara Kishida, 1991
34. Cyana carmina (Cerny, 1993)
35. Cyana catorhoda Hampson, 1897
36. Cyana cernyi Lourens, 2011
37. Cyana charybdis (Bethune-Baker, 1904)
38. Cyana chrysopeleia N. Singh et al., 2020
39. Cyana coccinea (Moore, 1878)
40. Cyana conclusa (Walker, 1862)
41. Cyana consequenta Lourens, 2011
42. Cyana cornutissima Volynkin & Lázló, 2020
43. Cyana costifimbria (Walker, 1862)
44. Cyana crasizona (Wileman & West, 1928)
45. Cyana croceizona (Hampson, 1914)
46. Cyana curioi Lourens, 2011
47. Cyana delicata (Walker, 1854)
48. Cyana determinata (Walker, 1862)
49. Cyana detoulgoeti Volynkin, 2020
50. Cyana detrita Walker, 1854 - type species
51. Cyana distincta (Rothschild, 1912)
52. Cyana divakara (Moore, 1866)
53. Cyana dohertyi (Elwes, 1890)
54. Cyana dryope Volynkin & N. Singh, 2020
55. Cyana dudgeoni Hampson, 1895
56. Cyana effracta (Walker, 1854)
57. Cyana ellipsis Karisch & Dall'asta, 2010
58. Cyana ethiopica Karisch, 2013
59. Cyana euryxantha (Hampson, 1914)
60. Cyana exprimata Karisch, 2013
61. Cyana fasciata Karisch, 2013
62. Cyana flammeostrigata Karisch, 2003
63. Cyana formosana (Hampson, 1909)
64. Cyana fossi Volynkin & Ivanova, 2021
65. Cyana fulvia Linnaeus, 1758
66. Cyana gabriellae (Cerny, 1993)
67. Cyana gelida Walker, 1854
68. Cyana geminipuncta (Cerny, 1993)
69. Cyana gonypetes (Prout, 1919)
70. Cyana griseilinea (de Joannis Joannis, 1930)
71. Cyana hamata (Walker, 1854)
72. Cyana hecqi (Karisch & Dall'asta, 2010)
73. Cyana heidrunae (Hoppe, 2004)
74. Cyana horsfieldi Roepke, 1946
75. Cyana ibabaoae Lourens, 2011
76. Cyana ignifera Karisch, 2013
77. Cyana inconclusa (Walker, 1862)
78. Cyana innocua Karisch, 2013
79. Cyana interrogationis (Poujade, 1886)
80. Cyana inusitata (Bethune-Baker, 1910)
81. Cyana janinae Lourens, 2009
82. Cyana katanga Karisch & Dall’Asta, 2010
83. Cyana khasiana Hampson, 1897
84. Cyana klausruedigerbecki (Karisch, 2005)
85. Cyana klohsi Karisch, 2003
86. Cyana lada Volynkin, Černý & Saldaitis, 2019
87. Cyana leechi Volynkin, 2021
88. Cyana libulae (Cerny, 1993)
89. Cyana linatula (Swinhoe, 1891)
90. Cyana lobata Karisch, 2013
91. Cyana loloana (Strand, 1912)
92. Cyana luchoana (Karisch, 2003)
93. Cyana lunulata Semper, 1899
94. Cyana lutipes (Hampson, 1900)
95. Cyana luzonica (Wileman & South)
96. Cyana magnitrigutta Karisch, 2013
97. Cyana malayensis (Hampson, 1914)
98. Cyana margarethae (Kiriakoff, 1958)
99. Cyana marshalli (Hampson, 1900)
100. Cyana melanoplagia (Hampson, 1914)
101. Cyana metamelas (Hampson, 1914)
102. Cyana meyi Karisch, 2013
103. Cyana meyricki (Rothschild, 1901)
104. Cyana miles Butler, 1887
105. Cyana molleri (Elwes, 1890)
106. Cyana moupinensis (Leech, 1899)
107. Cyana natalensis Karisch, 2013
108. Cyana nemasisha (Roesler, 1990)
109. Cyana nigroplagata (Bethune-Baker, 1910)
110. Cyana nussi Karisch, 2013
111. Cyana nyasica (Hampson, 1918)
112. Cyana obliquilineata (Hampson, 1900)
113. Cyana obscura (Hampson, 1900)
114. Cyana occidentalis Volynkin & Lázló, 2020
115. Cyana ochrata Karisch, 2013
116. Cyana owadai (Kishida, 1991)
117. Cyana pallida Karisch, 2013
118. Cyana pallidilinea (Karisch, 2003)
119. Cyana paramargarethae Karisch & Dall'asta, 2010
120. Cyana pauliani (de Toulgoët, 1954)
121. Cyana pellucida (Rothschild, 1936)
122. Cyana peregrina (Walker, 1854)
123. Cyana perornata (Walker, 1854)
124. Cyana phycomata (Wileman & West, 1928)
125. Cyana pratti (Elwes, 1890)
126. Cyana pretoriae (Distant, 1897)
127. Cyana pudens (Walker, 1862)
128. Cyana puella (Drury, 1773)
129. Cyana punctistrigosa (Rothschild, 1913)
130. Cyana quadrinotata (Walker, 1869)
131. Cyana quentini Karisch, 2003
132. Cyana rawlinsi Karisch, 2013
133. Cyana balls (Walker, 1854)
134. Cyana rhodostriata (Hampson, 1914)
135. Cyana rosabra (Wileman, 1925)
136. Cyana rubrifasciata (Druce, 1883)
137. Cyana rubrifinis Lourens, 2011
138. Cyana rubristriga (Holland, 1893)
139. Cyana rubritermina (Bethune-Baker, 1911)
140. Cyana rubriterminalis (Strand, 1912 – incertae sedis)
141. Cyana rudloffi Volynkin & N. Singh, 2020
142. Cyana rufeola Karisch & Dall’Asta, 2010
143. Cyana rufifrons (Rothschild, 1912)
144. Cyana ruwenzoriana (Karisch, 2003)
145. Cyana rwandana Karisch, 2013
146. Cyana saalmuelleri (Butler, 1882)
147. Cyana saulia (Swinhoe, 1901)
148. Cyana schaeferi (Gaede, 1924 – incertae sedis)
149. Cyana selangorica (Hampson, 1903)
150. Cyana signa (Walker, 1854)
151. Cyana soror (Cerny, 1993)
152. Cyana speideli Karisch, 2013
153. Cyana squalida Karisch, 2013
154. Cyana subalba (Wileman, 1910)
155. Cyana sublutipes (Kishida, 1991)
156. Cyana subornata (Walker, 1854)
157. Cyana suessmuthi Karisch, 2013
158. Cyana tettigonioides (Heylaerts, 1892)
159. Cyana thoracica (Rothschild & Jordan, 1901)
160. Cyana titovi Volynkin, Černý & Ivanova, 2019
161. Cyana togoana (Strand, 1912)
162. Cyana torrida (Holland, 1893)
163. Cyana transfasciata (Rothschild, 1912)
164. Cyana treadawayi (Cerny, 1993)
165. Cyana trigona (Rothschild, 1903)
166. Cyana trigutta Walker, 1854
167. Cyana tripuncta (de Toulgoet, 1980)
168. Cyana tripunctata Rothschild, 1936
169. Cyana ueleana (Karisch, 2003)
170. Cyana unipunctata (Elwes, 1890)
171. Cyana usambara Karisch, 2013
172. Cyana v-nigrum (Cerny, 1993)
173. Cyana venusta Karisch, 2013
174. Cyana vespertata (Cerny, 1993)
175. Cyana watsoni Hampson, 1897
176. Cyana yao Volynkin & Lázló, 2020
