= Cypress (disambiguation) =

Cypress is a common name for multiple coniferous trees and shrubs in the family Cupressaceae.

Cypress may also refer to:

== Places ==
=== United States ===
- Cypress, California, a city
- Cypress, Florida, an unincorporated community
- Cypress, Illinois, a village
- Cypress, Indiana, an unincorporated community
- Cypress, Texas, an unincorporated community
- Cypress Island, Washington
- Cypress Creek (Logan Creek), Missouri
- Cypress Creek (Texas)

=== Canada ===
- Cypress County, a district in Alberta
- Cypress Provincial Park, greater Vancouver, British Columbia
- Cypress (former Alberta provincial electoral district)
- Cypress (former Manitoba provincial electoral district)
- Cypress (former Saskatchewan provincial electoral district)

== Music ==
- Cypresses, an 1865 cycle of 18 songs by Dvořák
- Cypresses quartet (Dvořák), a set of 12 string-quartet arrangements by Dvořák based on his song-cycle of the same name
- Cypress (album), a 1984 album by the American band Let's Active
- Cypress Records, a record label
- Cypress, a 2022 extended play by Sarah Kinsley

== Companies ==
- Cypress Group, a US private equity firm
- Cypress Semiconductor, a semiconductor manufacturing company based in San Jose, California

== Schools ==
- Cypress College, a community college in Cypress, California
- Cypress High School, Cypress, California
- Cypress Christian School, near Cypress, Texas
- Cypress Bay High School, in Weston, Florida

== Other uses ==
- Cypress (software), a test automation tool
- The Cypress (Brookline High School), a student newspaper
- Cypress Mine, a coal mine on the South Island of New Zealand
- USCGC Cypress (WLB-210), a United States Coast Guard cutter
- Tawny Cypress (born 1976), American actress
- Cypress, codename of the ATI Radeon HD5800 series of graphics processing units
- Cypress Street Viaduct a raised two-deck freeway in Oakland, California that collapsed during the 1989 Loma Prieta earthquake

== See also ==
- Cypress Hills (disambiguation)
- Cypress Lake (disambiguation)
- Cypris (disambiguation)
- Cyprus (disambiguation)
