= Lambula =

Scientific classification
- Kingdom: Animalia
- Phylum: Arthropoda
- Class: Insecta
- Order: Lepidoptera
- Superfamily: Noctuoidea
- Family: Erebidae
- Subfamily: Arctiinae
- Subtribe: Lithosiina
- Genus: Lambula; Walker, 1866

Synonyms
- Palaexera Meyrick, 1886

Genus of moths

Lambula is a genus of moths in the family Erebidae. The genus was erected by Francis Walker in 1866.

== Species ==
- Lambula aethalocis Hampson, 1914
- Lambula agraphia Hampson, 1900
- Lambula albicentra De Vos, 2019
- Lambula arfakensis De Vos, 2019
- Lambula aroa Bethune-Baker, 1904
- Lambula bilineata Bethune-Baker, 1904
- Lambula bivittata Rothschild, 1912
- Lambula buergersi Gaede, 1925
- Lambula castanea Rothschild, 1912
- Lambula contigua Rothschild, 1916
- Lambula costiplaga De Vos, 2019
- Lambula erema Collenette, 1935
- Lambula errata van Eecke, 1927
- Lambula flavibasis De Vos, 2019
- Lambula flavobrunnea Rothschild, 1912
- Lambula flavogrisea Rothschild, 1912
- Lambula fuliginosa (Walker, 1862)
- Lambula fuscibasis De Vos, 2019
- Lambula hypopolius (Rothschild, 1916)
- Lambula laniafera Hampson, 1900
- Lambula longiductus De Vos, 2019
- Lambula melaleuca Walker, 1866
- Lambula malayana Holloway, 1982
- Lambula marginata De Vos, 2019
- Lambula nigra van Eecke, 1929
- Lambula nigrescens De Vos, 2019
- Lambula obliquilinea Hampson, 1900
- Lambula pallescens De Vos, 2019
- Lambula pallida Hampson, 1900
- Lambula phyllodes (Meyrick, 1886)
- Lambula pleuroptycha Turner, 1940
- Lambula plicata Hampson, 1900
- Lambula pristina (Walker, 1866)
- Lambula punctifer Hampson, 1900
- Lambula sibilensis De Vos, 2019
- Lambula transcripta (Lucas, 1890)
- Lambula tristis De Vos, 2019
- Lambula umbrina Rothschild, 1915
- Lambula vanrossemi De Vos, 2019

== Former species ==
- Lambula dampierensis Rothschild, 1916
- Lambula minuta Rothschild, 1912
- Lambula orbonella Hampson, 1900
