= Kypris =

Kypris may refer to:

- Cypris, or Aphrodite, a Greek goddess
- Yorgos Kypris, Greek sculptor

== See also ==
- Cypris (disambiguation)
- Cyprus (disambiguation)
