= Cypress Lake =

Cypress Lake or Cypress Lakes refers to several locations in North America:

== Lakes ==
- Cypress Lake (Lafayette, Louisiana)
- Cypress Lake (Saskatchewan), a lake is Saskatchewan, Canada
- Cypress Lake, a lake in Hempstead County, Arkansas
- Cypress Lake, a lake in Miller County, Arkansas
- Cypress Lake, a lake in White County, Arkansas

== Other uses ==
- Cypress Lake, Florida, a census-designated place
- Cypress Lake High School, Florida
- Cypress Lake Preserve, Ridge Manor, Florida
- Cypress Lakes, Florida, a former census-designated place
- Cypress Lakes High School, Texas

== See also ==
- Blue Cypress Lake, a lake in Florida
