= Holocraspedon =

Scientific classification
- Kingdom: Animalia
- Phylum: Arthropoda
- Class: Insecta
- Order: Lepidoptera
- Superfamily: Noctuoidea
- Family: Erebidae
- Subfamily: Arctiinae
- Subtribe: Cisthenina
- Genus: Holocraspedon; Hampson, 1893

Genus of moths

Holocraspedon is a genus of moths in the family Erebidae first described by George Hampson in 1893.

== Description ==
Palpi porrect (extending forward) and reaching beyond the frons. Antennae ciliated in male. Forewings with veins 4 and 5 from angle of cell. Vein 6 from below upper angle. Veins 7, 8 and 9, 10 stalked. Hindwings with veins 4 and 5 from angle of cell. Veins 6 and 7 stalked whereas vein 8 from near end of cell.

== Species ==
- Holocraspedon bilineata (Hampson, 1901)
- Holocraspedon erkunin (Pagenstecher, 1886)
- Holocraspedon flava (van Eecke, 1927)
- Holocraspedon mediopuncta (Rothschild, 1913)
- Holocraspedon nigropunctum Hampson, 1893
- Holocraspedon parallelum (Semper, 1899)
- Holocraspedon vaneeckei Holloway, 2001

== Former species ==
- Holocraspedon hypopolius (Rothschild, 1916)
