= Eucyclopera cynara =

Scientific classification
- Domain: Eukaryota
- Kingdom: Animalia
- Phylum: Arthropoda
- Class: Insecta
- Order: Lepidoptera
- Superfamily: Noctuoidea
- Family: Erebidae
- Subfamily: Arctiinae
- Genus: Eucyclopera
- Species: E. cynara

Binomial name
- Eucyclopera cynara (H. Druce, 1894)

Synonyms
- Brycea cynara; Cisthene cynara

Species of moth

Eucyclopera cynara is a moth of the family Erebidae first described by Herbert Druce in 1894. It is found in Mexico.
