= Darantasia =

Scientific classification
- Kingdom: Animalia
- Phylum: Arthropoda
- Class: Insecta
- Order: Lepidoptera
- Superfamily: Noctuoidea
- Family: Erebidae
- Subfamily: Arctiinae
- Tribe: Lithosiini
- Subtribe: Nudariina
- Genus: Darantasia; Walker, 1859

Synonyms
- Coutha Walker, [1865]; Peronetis Meyrick, 1886

Genus of moths

Darantasia is a genus of moths in the family Erebidae. The genus was erected by Francis Walker in 1859.

== Species ==
- Darantasia apicata
- Darantasia caerulescens
- Darantasia cuneiplena
- Darantasia cuprea
- Darantasia cyanifera
- Darantasia cyanoxantha
- Darantasia ecxathia
- Darantasia goldiei
- Darantasia mesosema
- Darantasia obliqua
- Darantasia orbonella
- Darantasia pardalina
- Darantasia punctata
- Darantasia rumolda
- Darantasia semiclusa
- Darantasia seria
- Darantasia triplagiata
- Darantasia xenodora
