= Lambula erema =

Scientific classification
- Domain: Eukaryota
- Kingdom: Animalia
- Phylum: Arthropoda
- Class: Insecta
- Order: Lepidoptera
- Superfamily: Noctuoidea
- Family: Erebidae
- Subfamily: Arctiinae
- Genus: Lambula
- Species: L. erema

Binomial name
- Lambula erema Collenette, 1935

Species of moth

Lambula erema is a moth of the family Erebidae. It was described by Cyril Leslie Collenette in 1935. It is found on the Marquesas Archipelago.
