= Lambula flavogrisea =

Scientific classification
- Domain: Eukaryota
- Kingdom: Animalia
- Phylum: Arthropoda
- Class: Insecta
- Order: Lepidoptera
- Superfamily: Noctuoidea
- Family: Erebidae
- Subfamily: Arctiinae
- Genus: Lambula
- Species: L. flavogrisea

Binomial name
- Lambula flavogrisea (Rothschild, 1912)

Synonyms
- Poliosia flavogrisea Rothschild, 1912

Species of moth

Lambula flavogrisea is a moth of the family Erebidae. It was described by Walter Rothschild in 1912. It is found in New Guinea.
