= Lambula phyllodes =

Scientific classification
- Kingdom: Animalia
- Phylum: Arthropoda
- Class: Insecta
- Order: Lepidoptera
- Superfamily: Noctuoidea
- Family: Erebidae
- Subfamily: Arctiinae
- Genus: Lambula
- Species: L. phyllodes

Binomial name
- Lambula phyllodes (Meyrick, 1886)

Synonyms
- Palaexera phyllodes Meyrick, 1886

Species of moth

Lambula phyllodes is a moth of the family Erebidae. It was described by Edward Meyrick in 1886. It is found in Australia.
