= Lambula melaleuca =

Scientific classification
- Kingdom: Animalia
- Phylum: Arthropoda
- Class: Insecta
- Order: Lepidoptera
- Superfamily: Noctuoidea
- Family: Erebidae
- Subfamily: Arctiinae
- Genus: Lambula
- Species: L. melaleuca

Binomial name
- Lambula melaleuca Walker, 1866

Species of moth

Lambula melaleuca is a moth of the family Erebidae. It was described by Francis Walker in 1866. It is found on the Moluccas. It is the type species of the genus Lambula.
