= Darantasia pardalina =

Scientific classification
- Domain: Eukaryota
- Kingdom: Animalia
- Phylum: Arthropoda
- Class: Insecta
- Order: Lepidoptera
- Superfamily: Noctuoidea
- Family: Erebidae
- Subfamily: Arctiinae
- Genus: Darantasia
- Species: D. pardalina

Binomial name
- Darantasia pardalina (Felder, 1875)

Synonyms
- Cyme pardalina Felder, 1875; Darantasia celebensis Draudt, 1914

Species of moth

Darantasia pardalina is a moth of the family Erebidae first described by Felder in 1875. It is found on Sulawesi and the Sula Islands in Indonesia.
