= Holocraspedon bilineata =

Scientific classification
- Kingdom: Animalia
- Phylum: Arthropoda
- Class: Insecta
- Order: Lepidoptera
- Superfamily: Noctuoidea
- Family: Erebidae
- Subfamily: Arctiinae
- Genus: Holocraspedon
- Species: H. bilineata

Binomial name
- Holocraspedon bilineata (Hampson, 1901)

Synonyms
- Eugoa bilineata Hampson, 1901; Nola lauta Swinhoe, 1903; Philenora lauta

Species of moth

Holocraspedon bilineata is a moth of the family Erebidae first described by George Hampson in 1901. It is found in Singapore, Thailand and the north-eastern Himalayas, as well as on Peninsular Malaysia, Borneo, Sulawesi and Sumbawa. The habitat consists of lowland forests and wet heath forests.

The ground colour of the forewings is fawn with a distinctive pattern of dark brown markings.
