= Holocraspedon nigropunctum =

Scientific classification
- Kingdom: Animalia
- Phylum: Arthropoda
- Class: Insecta
- Order: Lepidoptera
- Superfamily: Noctuoidea
- Family: Erebidae
- Subfamily: Arctiinae
- Genus: Holocraspedon
- Species: H. nigropunctum

Binomial name
- Holocraspedon nigropunctum Hampson, 1893

Synonyms
- Holocraspedon nigripuncta

Species of moth

Holocraspedon nigropunctum is a moth of the family Erebidae. It was described by George Hampson in 1893. It is found in Sri Lanka.

== Description ==
Its wingspan is about 20 mm. In the male, the head, thorax and abdomen are white. Thorax spotted with black. Forewings are white, some specimens with a black costal base. A curved antemedial black line is present, where a spot in the cell and a spot at end of it can be seen. There is a postmedial line excurved round of cell and joining the antemedial line at inner margin. Some black streaks found beyond the postmedial line. There is a marginal series of short lines present. Apex is slightly suffused with fuscous. Cocoon is suspended by a cord and formed a network of strengthened by two cross bands.
