= Darantasia ecxathia =

Scientific classification
- Kingdom: Animalia
- Phylum: Arthropoda
- Class: Insecta
- Order: Lepidoptera
- Superfamily: Noctuoidea
- Family: Erebidae
- Subfamily: Arctiinae
- Genus: Darantasia
- Species: D. ecxathia

Binomial name
- Darantasia ecxathia Hampson, 1945

Species of moth

Darantasia ecxathia is a moth of the subfamily Arctiinae. It is found on Goodenough Island.
