= Eucyclopera =

Scientific classification
- Kingdom: Animalia
- Phylum: Arthropoda
- Class: Insecta
- Order: Lepidoptera
- Superfamily: Noctuoidea
- Family: Erebidae
- Subfamily: Arctiinae
- Tribe: Lithosiini
- Subtribe: Nudariina
- Genus: Eucyclopera; Hampson, 1895

Genus of moths

Eucyclopera is a genus of moths in the family Erebidae. The genus was erected by George Hampson in 1895.

== Species ==
- Eucyclopera abdulla
- Eucyclopera boliviana
- Eucyclopera carpintera
- Eucyclopera chorion
- Eucyclopera cynara
- Eucyclopera cynossema
- Eucyclopera cypris
- Eucyclopera ducei
- Eucyclopera flaviceps
- Eucyclopera minuta
- Eucyclopera plagidisca
