= Darantasia semiclusa =

Scientific classification
- Kingdom: Animalia
- Phylum: Arthropoda
- Class: Insecta
- Order: Lepidoptera
- Superfamily: Noctuoidea
- Family: Erebidae
- Subfamily: Arctiinae
- Genus: Darantasia
- Species: D. semiclusa

Binomial name
- Darantasia semiclusa (Walker, [1865])

Synonyms
- Coutha semiclusa Walker, [1865]; Cyme ochropyga Felder, 1875

Species of moth

Darantasia semiclusa is a moth of the family Erebidae first described by Francis Walker in 1865. It is found in Seram in Indonesia.
