= Eucyclopera plagidisca =

Scientific classification
- Kingdom: Animalia
- Phylum: Arthropoda
- Class: Insecta
- Order: Lepidoptera
- Superfamily: Noctuoidea
- Family: Erebidae
- Subfamily: Arctiinae
- Genus: Eucyclopera
- Species: E. plagidisca

Binomial name
- Eucyclopera plagidisca Hampson, 1895

Species of moth

Eucyclopera plagidisca is a moth of the family Erebidae first described by George Hampson in 1895. It is found in Bhutan.
