= Lambula malayana =

Scientific classification
- Kingdom: Animalia
- Phylum: Arthropoda
- Clade: Pancrustacea
- Class: Insecta
- Order: Lepidoptera
- Superfamily: Noctuoidea
- Family: Erebidae
- Subfamily: Arctiinae
- Genus: Lambula
- Species: L. malayana

Binomial name
- Lambula malayana Holloway, 1982

Species of moth

Lambula malayana is a moth of the family Erebidae. It was described by Jeremy Daniel Holloway in 1982. It is found in Malaysia.
