= Holocraspedon flava =

Scientific classification
- Kingdom: Animalia
- Phylum: Arthropoda
- Class: Insecta
- Order: Lepidoptera
- Superfamily: Noctuoidea
- Family: Erebidae
- Subfamily: Arctiinae
- Genus: Holocraspedon
- Species: H. flava

Binomial name
- Holocraspedon flava (van Eecke, 1927)

Synonyms
- Holocraspedum flava van Eecke, 1927

Species of moth

Holocraspedon flava is a moth of the family Erebidae. It was described by Rudolf van Eecke in 1927. It is found on Sumatra and possibly on Borneo.

The forewings are pale dull yellow and the hindwings are whitish.
