= Lambula umbrina =

Scientific classification
- Domain: Eukaryota
- Kingdom: Animalia
- Phylum: Arthropoda
- Class: Insecta
- Order: Lepidoptera
- Superfamily: Noctuoidea
- Family: Erebidae
- Subfamily: Arctiinae
- Genus: Lambula
- Species: L. umbrina

Binomial name
- Lambula umbrina (Rothschild, 1915)

Synonyms
- Macaduma umbrina Rothschild, 1915

Species of moth

Lambula umbrina is a moth of the family Erebidae. It was described by Walter Rothschild in 1915. It is only known from the holotype, which was collected near the Utakwa River in the Snow Mountains of Papua.
