= Lambula castanea =

Scientific classification
- Domain: Eukaryota
- Kingdom: Animalia
- Phylum: Arthropoda
- Class: Insecta
- Order: Lepidoptera
- Superfamily: Noctuoidea
- Family: Erebidae
- Subfamily: Arctiinae
- Genus: Lambula
- Species: L. castanea

Binomial name
- Lambula castanea Rothschild, 1912

Species of moth

Lambula castanea is a moth of the family Erebidae. It was described by Walter Rothschild in 1912. It has only been recorded from Papua. The habitat consists of mountainous areas.
