= Eucyclopera cynossema =

Scientific classification
- Domain: Eukaryota
- Kingdom: Animalia
- Phylum: Arthropoda
- Class: Insecta
- Order: Lepidoptera
- Superfamily: Noctuoidea
- Family: Erebidae
- Subfamily: Arctiinae
- Genus: Eucyclopera
- Species: E. cynossema

Binomial name
- Eucyclopera cynossema (H. Druce, 1894)

Synonyms
- Ruscino cynossema; Cisthene cynossema; Eudesmia cynossema

Species of moth

Eucyclopera cynossema is a moth of the family Erebidae first described by Herbert Druce in 1894. It is found in Mexico and Guatemala.
