= Lambula pallida =

Scientific classification
- Kingdom: Animalia
- Phylum: Arthropoda
- Class: Insecta
- Order: Lepidoptera
- Superfamily: Noctuoidea
- Family: Erebidae
- Subfamily: Arctiinae
- Genus: Lambula
- Species: L. pallida

Binomial name
- Lambula pallida Hampson, 1900

Species of moth

Lambula pallida is a moth of the family Erebidae. It was described by George Hampson in 1900. It is found on Borneo and in Thailand. The habitat consists of dry heath forests and coastal forests.
