= Lambula pristina =

Scientific classification
- Kingdom: Animalia
- Phylum: Arthropoda
- Class: Insecta
- Order: Lepidoptera
- Superfamily: Noctuoidea
- Family: Erebidae
- Subfamily: Arctiinae
- Genus: Lambula
- Species: L. pristina

Binomial name
- Lambula pristina (Walker, 1866)

Synonyms
- Lithosia pristina Walker, 1866; Scoliacma iridescens Lucas, 1890; Lambula thermopepla Hampson, 1914; Macaduma rothschildi Draudt, 1914

Species of moth

Lambula pristina is a moth of the family Erebidae. It was described by Francis Walker in 1866. It is found in Australia (Queensland, the Northern Territory and New South Wales).

The wingspan is about 20 mm.

The larvae feed on Raphia australis.
