= Lambula plicata =

Scientific classification
- Kingdom: Animalia
- Phylum: Arthropoda
- Class: Insecta
- Order: Lepidoptera
- Superfamily: Noctuoidea
- Family: Erebidae
- Subfamily: Arctiinae
- Genus: Lambula
- Species: L. plicata

Binomial name
- Lambula plicata Hampson, 1900

Species of moth

Lambula plicata is a moth of the family Erebidae. It was described by George Hampson in 1900. It is only known from the holotype, which was collected near Fakfak on New Guinea.
