= Lambula flavobrunnea =

Scientific classification
- Domain: Eukaryota
- Kingdom: Animalia
- Phylum: Arthropoda
- Class: Insecta
- Order: Lepidoptera
- Superfamily: Noctuoidea
- Family: Erebidae
- Subfamily: Arctiinae
- Genus: Lambula
- Species: L. flavobrunnea

Binomial name
- Lambula flavobrunnea Rothschild, 1912

Species of moth

Lambula flavobrunnea is a moth of the family Erebidae. It was described by Walter Rothschild in 1912. It is found in Papua, Indonesia, where it is distributed in the Central Mountain Range.
