= Cypris (disambiguation) =

Cypris is a name for Aphrodite, the Greek goddess of love.

Cypris may also refer to:

== Mythology ==
- Cypris, one of the Horae, Greek goddesses personifying the hours of the day
- Cypris, a role in the opera Ariane by Jules Massenet

== Biology ==
- Cypris, a genus of ostracod in the family Cyprididae
- Cypris, a barnacle larva in its final, cyprid stage
- Apanteles cypris, a species of braconid wasp in the genus Apanteles
- Eudesmia cypris, a species of moth in the family Erebidae
- Morpho cypris, a species of neotropical butterfly
- Phoebis cypris, synonym for Phoebis argante, a species of butterfly in the family Pieridae
- Tipula cypris, a species of crane fly in the genus Tipula

== Other ==
- CYPRIS (microchip), a cryptographic microprocessor
- Villa Cypris, a villa in the French Riviera

== See also ==
- Cypress (disambiguation)
- Cyprus (disambiguation)
