= Lambula aethalocis =

Scientific classification
- Kingdom: Animalia
- Phylum: Arthropoda
- Class: Insecta
- Order: Lepidoptera
- Superfamily: Noctuoidea
- Family: Erebidae
- Subfamily: Arctiinae
- Genus: Lambula
- Species: L. aethalocis

Binomial name
- Lambula aethalocis Hampson, 1914

Synonyms
- Scoliacma fulginosa Rothschild, 1912

Species of moth

Lambula aethalocis is a moth of the family Erebidae. It was described by George Hampson in 1914. It is found on New Guinea.
