= Holocraspedon parallelum =

Scientific classification
- Kingdom: Animalia
- Phylum: Arthropoda
- Class: Insecta
- Order: Lepidoptera
- Superfamily: Noctuoidea
- Family: Erebidae
- Subfamily: Arctiinae
- Genus: Holocraspedon
- Species: H. parallelum

Binomial name
- Holocraspedon parallelum (Semper, 1899)

Synonyms
- Holocraspedum parallelum Semper, 1899

Species of moth

Holocraspedon parallelum is a moth of the family Erebidae. It was described by Georg Semper in 1899. It is found in the Philippines.
