= Eucyclopera carpintera =

Scientific classification
- Domain: Eukaryota
- Kingdom: Animalia
- Phylum: Arthropoda
- Class: Insecta
- Order: Lepidoptera
- Superfamily: Noctuoidea
- Family: Erebidae
- Subfamily: Arctiinae
- Genus: Eucyclopera
- Species: E. carpintera

Binomial name
- Eucyclopera carpintera (Schaus, 1910)

Synonyms
- Brycea carpintera Schaus, 1910; Cyanarctia carpintera

Species of moth

Eucyclopera carpintera is a moth of the subfamily Arctiinae first described by William Schaus in 1910. It is found in Costa Rica.
