= Lambula laniafera =

Scientific classification
- Kingdom: Animalia
- Phylum: Arthropoda
- Class: Insecta
- Order: Lepidoptera
- Superfamily: Noctuoidea
- Family: Erebidae
- Subfamily: Arctiinae
- Genus: Lambula
- Species: L. laniafera

Binomial name
- Lambula laniafera Hampson, 1900

Species of moth

Lambula laniafera is a moth of the family Erebidae. It was described by George Hampson in 1900. It is found in Papua, Indonesia.

== Bibliography ==
- Pitkin, Brian & Jenkins, Paul. "Search results Family: Arctiidae". Butterflies and Moths of the World. Natural History Museum, London.
