= Darantasia seria =

Scientific classification
- Kingdom: Animalia
- Phylum: Arthropoda
- Clade: Pancrustacea
- Class: Insecta
- Order: Lepidoptera
- Superfamily: Noctuoidea
- Family: Erebidae
- Subfamily: Arctiinae
- Genus: Darantasia
- Species: D. seria

Binomial name
- Darantasia seria Holloway, 2001

Species of moth

Darantasia seria is a moth of the family Erebidae first described by Jeremy Daniel Holloway in 2001. It is found on Borneo. The habitat consists of coastal areas.

The length of the forewings is 9–10 mm.
