= Holocraspedon erkunin =

Scientific classification
- Kingdom: Animalia
- Phylum: Arthropoda
- Class: Insecta
- Order: Lepidoptera
- Superfamily: Noctuoidea
- Family: Erebidae
- Subfamily: Arctiinae
- Genus: Holocraspedon
- Species: H. erkunin

Binomial name
- Holocraspedon erkunin (Pagenstecher, 1885)

Synonyms
- Pitane erkunin Pagenstecher, 1885; Eugoa erkunin; Eugoa erkunun Hampson, 1900; Philenora sordidior Rothschild, 1913

Species of moth

Holocraspedon erkunin is a moth of the family Erebidae first described by Arnold Pagenstecher in 1885. It is found on Aru and New Guinea.
