= Darantasia rumolda =

Scientific classification
- Kingdom: Animalia
- Phylum: Arthropoda
- Class: Insecta
- Order: Lepidoptera
- Superfamily: Noctuoidea
- Family: Erebidae
- Subfamily: Arctiinae
- Genus: Darantasia
- Species: D. rumolda

Binomial name
- Darantasia rumolda Schaus, 1924

Species of moth

Darantasia rumolda is a moth of the subfamily Arctiinae first described by William Schaus in 1924. It is found on Cuba.
