= Lambula bivittata =

Scientific classification
- Domain: Eukaryota
- Kingdom: Animalia
- Phylum: Arthropoda
- Class: Insecta
- Order: Lepidoptera
- Superfamily: Noctuoidea
- Family: Erebidae
- Subfamily: Arctiinae
- Genus: Lambula
- Species: L. bivittata

Binomial name
- Lambula bivittata (Rothschild, 1912)

Synonyms
- Scoliacma bivittata Rothschild, 1912

Species of moth

Lambula bivittata is a moth of the family Erebidae. It was described by Walter Rothschild in 1912. It is thought to be endemic to Papua New Guinea. The habitat consists of mountainous areas.
