= Holocraspedon vaneeckei =

Scientific classification
- Kingdom: Animalia
- Phylum: Arthropoda
- Clade: Pancrustacea
- Class: Insecta
- Order: Lepidoptera
- Superfamily: Noctuoidea
- Family: Erebidae
- Subfamily: Arctiinae
- Genus: Holocraspedon
- Species: H. vaneeckei

Binomial name
- Holocraspedon vaneeckei Holloway, 2001

Species of moth

Holocraspedon vaneeckei is a moth of the family Erebidae. It was described by Jeremy Daniel Holloway in 2001. It is found on Borneo and Sumatra. The habitat consists of lowland forests, including dipterocarp forests, swamps and secondary forests.

The length of the forewings is about 7 mm.
