= Darantasia punctata =

Scientific classification
- Kingdom: Animalia
- Phylum: Arthropoda
- Class: Insecta
- Order: Lepidoptera
- Superfamily: Noctuoidea
- Family: Erebidae
- Subfamily: Arctiinae
- Genus: Darantasia
- Species: D. punctata

Binomial name
- Darantasia punctata Hampson, 1900

Species of moth

Darantasia punctata is a moth of the family Erebidae first described by George Hampson in 1900. It is found in New Guinea.
