= Lambula bilineata =

Scientific classification
- Kingdom: Animalia
- Phylum: Arthropoda
- Clade: Pancrustacea
- Class: Insecta
- Order: Lepidoptera
- Superfamily: Noctuoidea
- Family: Erebidae
- Subfamily: Arctiinae
- Genus: Lambula
- Species: L. bilineata

Binomial name
- Lambula bilineata Bethune-Baker, 1904

Synonyms
- Crambidia bifasciata Rothschild, 1912

Species of moth

Lambula bilineata is a moth of the family Erebidae. It was described by George Thomas Bethune-Baker in 1904. It is widely distributed in New Guinea following the Central Mountain Range and other high mountain ridges.
