= Lambula contigua =

Scientific classification
- Domain: Eukaryota
- Kingdom: Animalia
- Phylum: Arthropoda
- Class: Insecta
- Order: Lepidoptera
- Superfamily: Noctuoidea
- Family: Erebidae
- Subfamily: Arctiinae
- Genus: Lambula
- Species: L. contigua

Binomial name
- Lambula contigua Rothschild, 1916

Species of moth

Lambula contigua is a moth of the family Erebidae. It was described by socialite and zoologist Walter Rothschild in 1916. It is found on the Dampier Archipelago.
