= Darantasia cuneiplena =

Scientific classification
- Kingdom: Animalia
- Phylum: Arthropoda
- Class: Insecta
- Order: Lepidoptera
- Superfamily: Noctuoidea
- Family: Erebidae
- Subfamily: Arctiinae
- Genus: Darantasia
- Species: D. cuneiplena

Binomial name
- Darantasia cuneiplena Walker, 1859

Synonyms
- Ammatho hieroglyphica Butler, 1877; Darantasia cuneilinea Draudt, 1914

Species of moth

Darantasia cuneiplena is a moth of the family Erebidae first described by Francis Walker in 1859. It is found in Sundaland and the Philippines. The habitat consists of lowland forests.
