= Lambula punctifer =

Scientific classification
- Kingdom: Animalia
- Phylum: Arthropoda
- Class: Insecta
- Order: Lepidoptera
- Superfamily: Noctuoidea
- Family: Erebidae
- Subfamily: Arctiinae
- Genus: Lambula
- Species: L. punctifer

Binomial name
- Lambula punctifer Hampson, 1900

Species of moth

Lambula punctifer is a moth of the family Erebidae. It was described by George Hampson in 1900. It is known only from a few specimens collected on New Guinea, including Fakfak, the Setekwa River and the Utakwa River.
