= Lambula pleuroptycha =

Scientific classification
- Domain: Eukaryota
- Kingdom: Animalia
- Phylum: Arthropoda
- Class: Insecta
- Order: Lepidoptera
- Superfamily: Noctuoidea
- Family: Erebidae
- Subfamily: Arctiinae
- Genus: Lambula
- Species: L. pleuroptycha

Binomial name
- Lambula pleuroptycha Turner, 1940

Species of moth

Lambula pleuroptycha is a moth of the family Erebidae. It was described by Alfred Jefferis Turner in 1940. It is found in Australia, where it has been recorded from the Northern Territory, Queensland and New South Wales.

The wingspan is about 20 mm.
