= Eucyclopera chorion =

Scientific classification
- Kingdom: Animalia
- Phylum: Arthropoda
- Class: Insecta
- Order: Lepidoptera
- Superfamily: Noctuoidea
- Family: Erebidae
- Subfamily: Arctiinae
- Genus: Eucyclopera
- Species: E. chorion

Binomial name
- Eucyclopera chorion (Dyar, 1917)

Synonyms
- Eudesmia chorion Dyar, 1917

Species of moth

Eucyclopera chorion is a moth of the family Erebidae. It is found in Venezuela.
