= Darantasia triplagiata =

Scientific classification
- Kingdom: Animalia
- Phylum: Arthropoda
- Class: Insecta
- Order: Lepidoptera
- Superfamily: Noctuoidea
- Family: Erebidae
- Subfamily: Arctiinae
- Genus: Darantasia
- Species: D. triplagiata

Binomial name
- Darantasia triplagiata Hampson, 1900

Species of moth

Darantasia triplagiata is a moth of the family Erebidae first described by George Hampson in 1900. It is found on Buru in Indonesia.
