= Cajun Field =

Football stadium in Lafayette, Louisiana

Cajun Field at Our Lady of Lourdes Stadium
- "The Swamp"
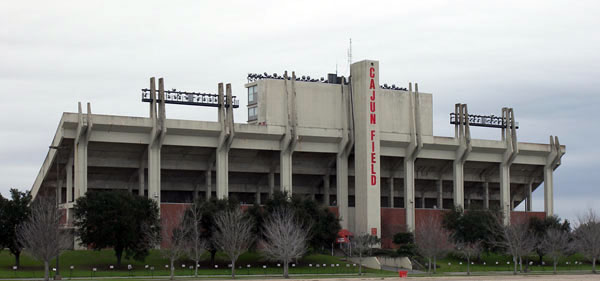

- Location in Louisiana Location in the United States
- Location: 201 Reinhardt Dr, Lafayette, Louisiana 70506
- Coordinates: 30°12′57″N 92°2′31″W
- Owner: University of Louisiana at Lafayette
- Operator: University of Louisiana at Lafayette
- Capacity: 30,392 (2025–present); 20,000 (2024); 41,264 (2016–2023); 41,426 (2014–2015); 31,000 (1992–2013); 26,000 (1971–1991); Additional capacity on hill behind north end zone (1971–present) and south end zone (1971–2014)
- Surface: artificial turf

Construction
- Groundbreaking: 1970
- Opened: September 25, 1971
- Renovated: 1992, 2008, 2014, 2024–present

Tenants
- Louisiana Ragin' Cajuns football (NCAA) (1971–present); New Orleans Bowl (NCAA) (2005); New Orleans Breakers (USFL) (1 game, 1984)

Cajun Field at Our Lady of Lourdes Stadium is a football stadium located on the South Campus of the University of Louisiana at Lafayette in the city of Lafayette, Louisiana. Nicknamed The Swamp, it is the home field of Louisiana Ragin' Cajuns athletics. Cajun Field is primarily used for its American football team. Newly completed renovations have Cajun Field at a capacity of 30,392 spectators as of the 2025 season.

It is currently the largest facility and football stadium in the Sun Belt Conference and the second largest college football stadium in Louisiana.

== History ==
In planning since at least 1967 (when a rendition was featured on the football media guide), it was built in 1970 as a replacement for McNaspy Stadium, opening on September 25, 1971, with a shutout of Santa Clara University. The stadium consists of a bowl with seating on the sidelines, with a second deck on the west sideline. In one of the biggest games at the stadium, on September 14, 1996, 38,783 spectators saw the Cajuns upset 25th-ranked Texas A&M, 29–22, the first victory for the Cajuns over a ranked opponent. The largest crowd at The Swamp as of 2013 was 41,357 fans on September 5, 2009, when the Cajuns beat Southern University 42–19 at the 9th annual Herbert Heymann Football Classic.

The stadium won the Sun Belt Conference Attendance Championship in 2004, 2008, and 2011.

Because of Hurricane Katrina, the 2005 New Orleans Bowl was played here instead of in New Orleans, with Southern Miss defeating Arkansas State, 31–19. Also the Tulane Green Wave football team used it for a home game in 2005 after being displaced by the hurricane.

In addition, Cajun Field hosted the final pre-season game of the New Orleans Breakers of the United States Football League on February 18, 1984, a 20–0 victory over the Memphis Showboats.

== Facility upgrades ==
=== Updated seating ===
In 1992, Cajun Field saw the capacity rise from 26,000 to 31,000 due to an upgrade to the ends of the stadium seating.

=== Synthetic surface and banners ===
In the summer of 2008 Cajun Field replaced its long-standing natural grass with ProGrass, an artificial turf. The stadium was pressure-washed and repainted. Advertisements and banners reading "University of Louisiana at Lafayette," "Ragin' Cajuns," and "www.ragincajuns.com" also were installed around the black retaining wall that surrounds the field.

=== Athletics master plan ===
In spring 2014, construction of the south endzone seating began. This first phase project included bowling in the south endzone with new bleacher seating as well as concession and restroom facilities. This change has increased capacity to 41,426 and was completed for the 2014 season kickoff. Daktronics also installed a 30-by-54-foot (9.1 by 16.5 m) HD screen in the north end zone, replacing the previous scoreboard.

=== Major renovation and name change ===
In June 2021 a major renovation was announced. The Our Lady of Lourdes Regional Medical Center has secured naming rights for the new facility to take the place of Cajun Field with a commitment to invest $15 million over 15 years. The facility will now be known as Cajun Field at Our Lady of Lourdes Stadium. The stadium officially started construction at the conclusion of the 2023 season, which was completed prior to the start of the 2025 season. During the preceding season in 2024, the stadium utilized the east side and south end zone, as well as north end zone grass seating.

== "The Swamp" ==
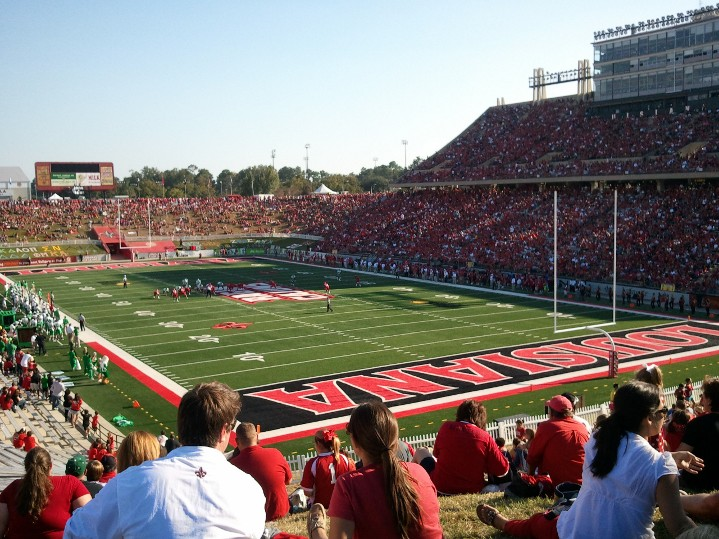
Cajun Field on gameday

Cajun Field's surface is two feet below sea level in a natural bowl. With the below-sea level playing surface, a total of four 60 horsepower (45 kW) pumps and a sophisticated drainage system help keep the field in good playing condition even during the frequent south Louisiana rainstorms. The subsurface stadium requires many fans to walk down to their seats. Ragin' Cajuns football players and their opponents enter Cajun Field through a tunnel from the Louisiana athletics complex.

In 1988 the stadium was nicknamed "The Swamp," as then noted on stadium signage, in the school yearbook and, a year later, in the 1989 official Southwestern Louisiana sports media guide. The nickname is tied to the field's early 1970s construction, and even refers to the original football field for what was then the Southwestern Louisiana Industrial Institute in the early 1900s. The university's first football field was on the main campus adjacent to a small cypress pond, which later became Cypress Lake, also nicknamed The Swamp.

The "Swamp" nickname also fits with the area's geography, with many bayous and wetlands, including the Atchafalaya Basin and the nearby Gulf of Mexico marshlands. The National Wetlands Research Center, a United States Geological Survey research facility at the University of Louisiana at Lafayette, is less than half a mile from Cajun Field.

Division I FBS Ben Hill Griffin Stadium at the University of Florida was later also nicknamed "The Swamp" by then-Gators head coach Steve Spurrier in 1991.

== Attendance records ==
Rankings come from AP poll

Rank	Attendance	Date	Game Result
1	41,357	September 5, 2009	Louisian 42, Southern 19
2	38,783	September 14, 1996	Southwestern Louisiana 29, 25 Texas A&M 22
3	36,170	August 30, 2014	Louisiana 45, Southern 6
4	36,133	October 6, 1990	Southwestern Louisiana 6, RV Alabama 25
5	33,828	September 15, 2007	Louisiana–Lafayette 17, McNeese State 38
6	32,823	October 15, 2011	Louisiana–Lafayette 30, North Texas 10 (vacated)
7	31,014	December 4, 2021	20 Louisiana 24, Appalachian State 16
8	30,176	November 6, 1976	Southwestern Louisiana 23, Arkansas State 14
9	30,028	November 2, 2013	Louisiana 49, New Mexico State 35 (vacated)
10	29,775	October 8, 2011	Louisiana 31, Troy 17 (vacated)
11	29,758	October 6, 2012	Louisiana 41, Tulane 13 (vacated)
12	29,031	November 1, 2008	Louisiana 49, FIU 20
13	28,871	September 14, 2013	Louisiana 70, Nicholls State 7 (vacated)
14	28,866	September 1, 2018	Louisiana 49, McNeese State 17
15	28,794	October 30, 2021	RV Louisiana 45, Texas State 0
16	28,752	November 12, 1977	Southwestern Louisiana 13, Northwestern State 20
17	28,741	September 17, 2011	Louisiana 38, Nicholls State 21 (vacated)
18	28,176	November 5, 2011	Louisianae 36, Louisiana–Monroe 35 (vacated)
19	27,814	October 30, 1993	Southwestern Louisiana 24, San Jose State 13
20	27,300	October 15, 1988	Southwestern Louisiana 45, Northern Illinois 0

== Gallery ==
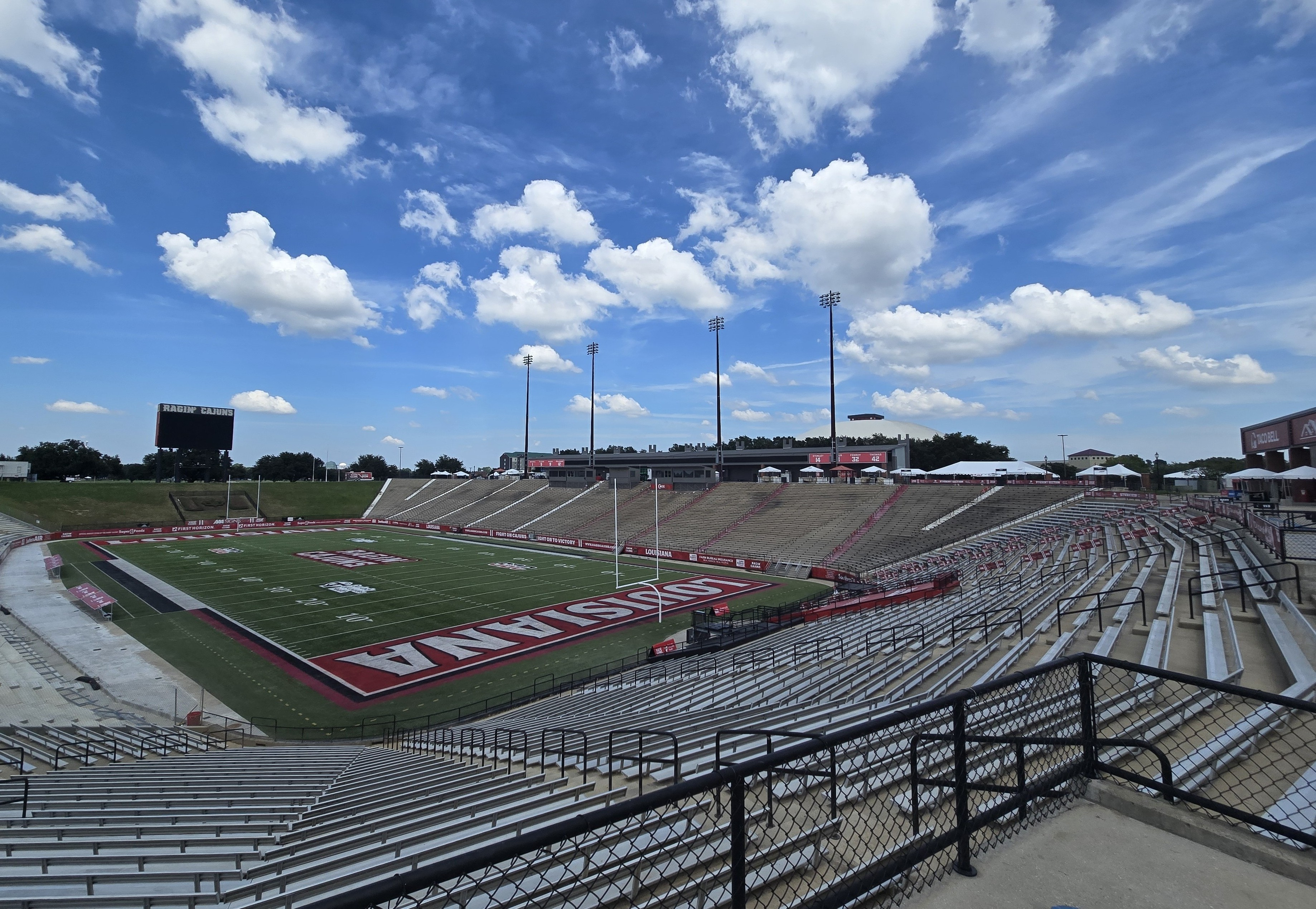
Cajun Field Panorama

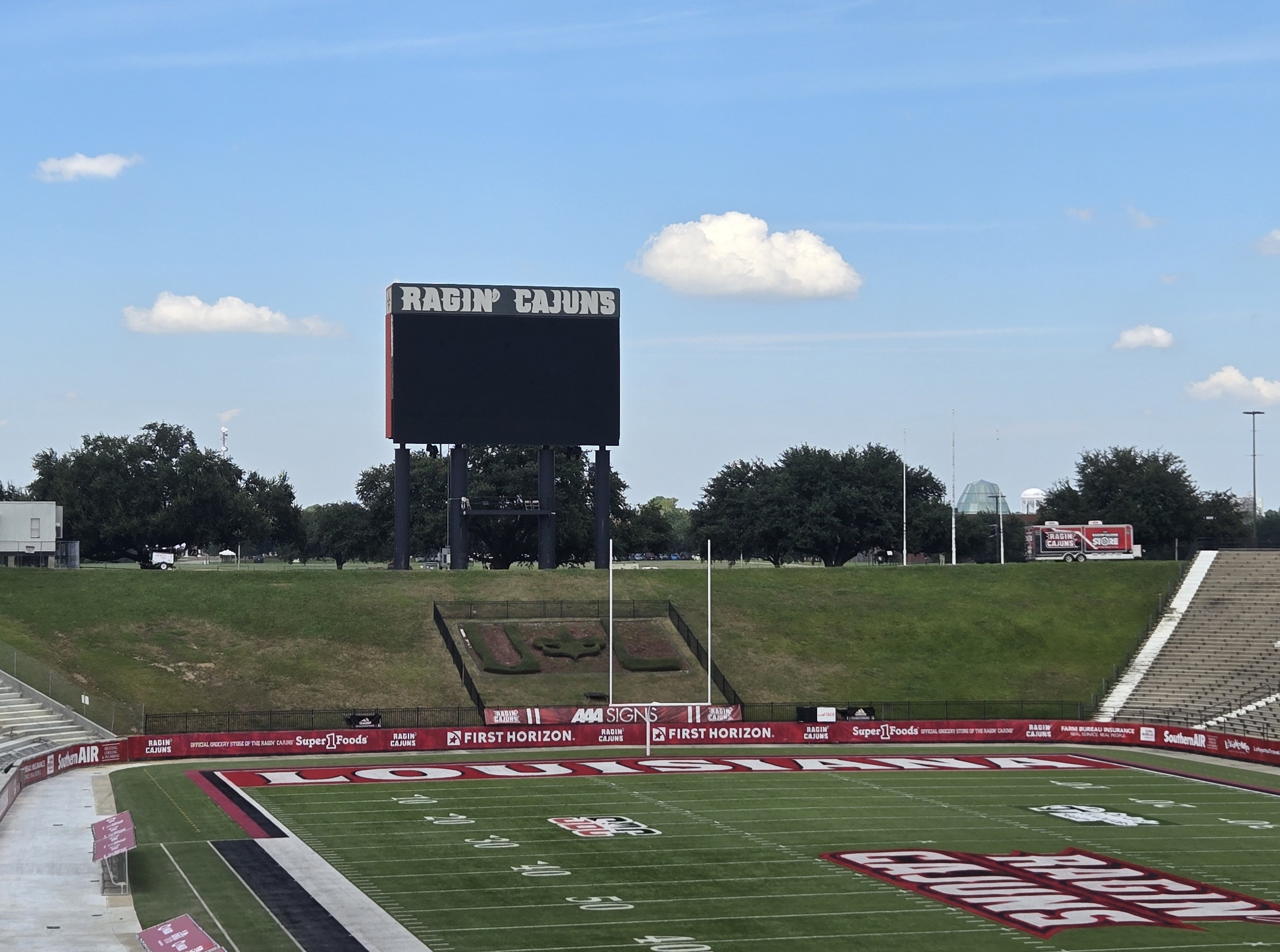
Cajun Field North Endzone

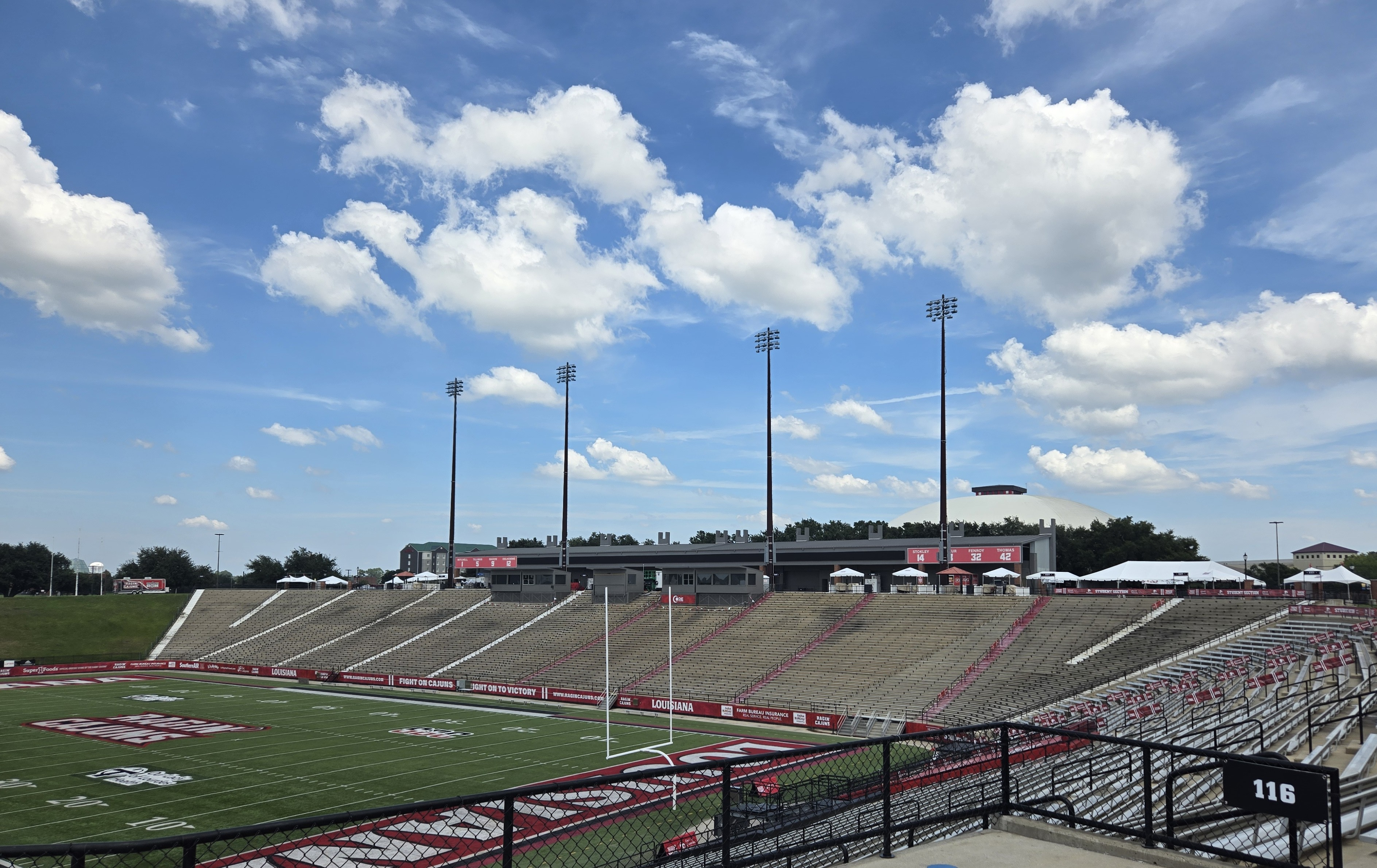
Cajun Field Away Stands

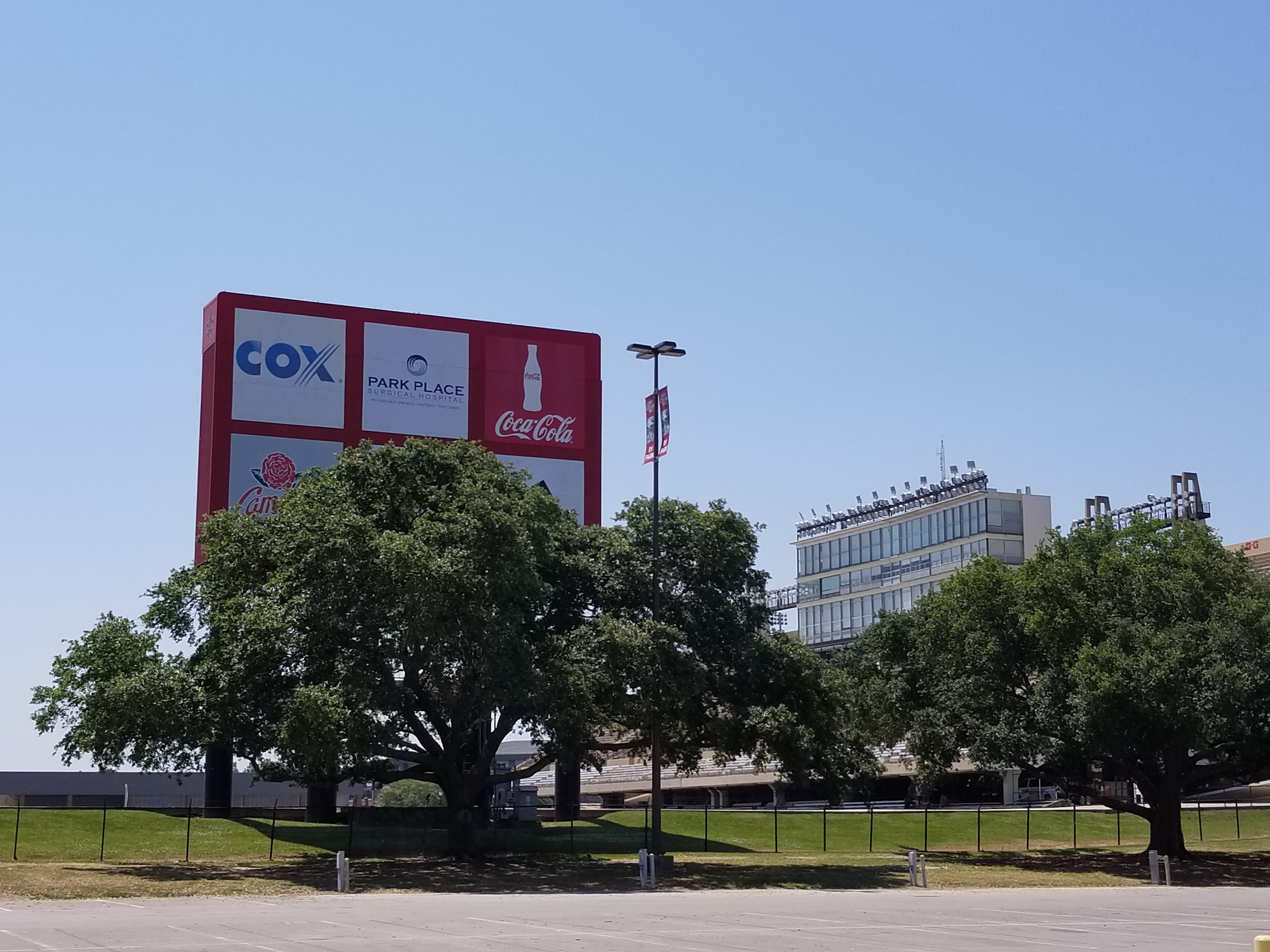
Cajun Field Scoreboard and Upper Deck

== See also ==
- List of NCAA Division I FBS football stadiums
- List of soccer stadiums in the United States
