= Holocraspedon mediopuncta =

Scientific classification
- Kingdom: Animalia
- Phylum: Arthropoda
- Class: Insecta
- Order: Lepidoptera
- Superfamily: Noctuoidea
- Family: Erebidae
- Subfamily: Arctiinae
- Genus: Holocraspedon
- Species: H. mediopuncta

Binomial name
- Holocraspedon mediopuncta (Rothschild, 1913)

Synonyms
- Eugoa mediopuncta Rothschild, 1913

Species of moth

Holocraspedon mediopuncta is a moth of the family Erebidae. It was described by Walter Rothschild in 1913. It is found on the Solomon Islands.
