= Darantasia xenodora =

Scientific classification
- Kingdom: Animalia
- Phylum: Arthropoda
- Class: Insecta
- Order: Lepidoptera
- Superfamily: Noctuoidea
- Family: Erebidae
- Subfamily: Arctiinae
- Genus: Darantasia
- Species: D. xenodora

Binomial name
- Darantasia xenodora (Meyrick, 1886)

Synonyms
- Peronetis xenodora Meyrick, 1886; Darantasia goldiei Druce, 1898; Darantasia obliqua Hampson, 1900

Species of moth

Darantasia xenodora is a moth of the family Erebidae first described by Edward Meyrick in 1886. It is found in New Guinea.
