= Lambula aroa =

Scientific classification
- Domain: Eukaryota
- Kingdom: Animalia
- Phylum: Arthropoda
- Class: Insecta
- Order: Lepidoptera
- Superfamily: Noctuoidea
- Family: Erebidae
- Subfamily: Arctiinae
- Genus: Lambula
- Species: L. aroa

Binomial name
- Lambula aroa Bethune-Baker, 1904

Species of moth

Lambula aroa is a moth of the family Erebidae. It was described by George Thomas Bethune-Baker in 1904. It is widely distributed in New Guinea, where it is found in the Central Mountain Range. In Papua New Guinea it is only found east from the Baliem Valley.
