= Eucyclopera boliviana =

Scientific classification
- Domain: Eukaryota
- Kingdom: Animalia
- Phylum: Arthropoda
- Class: Insecta
- Order: Lepidoptera
- Superfamily: Noctuoidea
- Family: Erebidae
- Subfamily: Arctiinae
- Genus: Eucyclopera
- Species: E. boliviana

Binomial name
- Eucyclopera boliviana (Forster, 1942)

Synonyms
- Cisthene boliviana Forster, 1942

Species of moth

Eucyclopera boliviana is a moth of the family Erebidae. It is found in Bolivia.
