= Lambula nigra =

Scientific classification
- Kingdom: Animalia
- Phylum: Arthropoda
- Clade: Pancrustacea
- Class: Insecta
- Order: Lepidoptera
- Superfamily: Noctuoidea
- Family: Erebidae
- Subfamily: Arctiinae
- Genus: Lambula
- Species: L. nigra

Binomial name
- Lambula nigra van Eecke, 1929

Species of moth

Lambula nigra is a moth of the family Erebidae. It was described by van Eecke in 1929. It is found in the island of Buru, Indonesia.
