= Lambula buergersi =

Scientific classification
- Domain: Eukaryota
- Kingdom: Animalia
- Phylum: Arthropoda
- Class: Insecta
- Order: Lepidoptera
- Superfamily: Noctuoidea
- Family: Erebidae
- Subfamily: Arctiinae
- Genus: Lambula
- Species: L. buergersi

Binomial name
- Lambula buergersi Gaede, 1925

Species of moth

Lambula buergersi is a moth of the family Erebidae. It was described by Max Gaede in 1925. It is found in Papua New Guinea. It was previously only known from Mulu, the type locality, but was later also collected in the Foja Mountains.
