= Eucyclopera flaviceps =

Scientific classification
- Kingdom: Animalia
- Phylum: Arthropoda
- Class: Insecta
- Order: Lepidoptera
- Superfamily: Noctuoidea
- Family: Erebidae
- Subfamily: Arctiinae
- Genus: Eucyclopera
- Species: E. flaviceps

Binomial name
- Eucyclopera flaviceps (Burmeister, 1878)

Synonyms
- Hypocrita flaviceps Burmeister, 1878

Species of moth

Eucyclopera flaviceps is a moth of the family Erebidae. It is found in Argentina.
