= Darantasia mesosema =

Scientific classification
- Kingdom: Animalia
- Phylum: Arthropoda
- Class: Insecta
- Order: Lepidoptera
- Superfamily: Noctuoidea
- Family: Erebidae
- Subfamily: Arctiinae
- Genus: Darantasia
- Species: D. mesosema

Binomial name
- Darantasia mesosema Hampson, 1914

Species of moth

Darantasia mesosema is a moth of the family Erebidae. It is found on the Bacan Islands.
