= Lambula errata =

Scientific classification
- Domain: Eukaryota
- Kingdom: Animalia
- Phylum: Arthropoda
- Class: Insecta
- Order: Lepidoptera
- Superfamily: Noctuoidea
- Family: Erebidae
- Subfamily: Arctiinae
- Genus: Lambula
- Species: L. errata

Binomial name
- Lambula errata van Eecke, 1927

Species of moth

Lambula errata is a moth of the family Erebidae. It was described by van Eecke in 1927. It is found on Sumatra and Borneo. The habitat consists of various lowland forest types.
