= Darantasia caerulescens =

Scientific classification
- Domain: Eukaryota
- Kingdom: Animalia
- Phylum: Arthropoda
- Class: Insecta
- Order: Lepidoptera
- Superfamily: Noctuoidea
- Family: Erebidae
- Subfamily: Arctiinae
- Genus: Darantasia
- Species: D. caerulescens

Binomial name
- Darantasia caerulescens H. Druce, 1898

Synonyms
- Darantasia pervittata Hampson, 1903; Darantasia extensa Rothschild, 1916

Species of moth

Darantasia caerulescens is a moth of the family Erebidae first described by Herbert Druce in 1898. It is found in New Guinea.
