= Eucyclopera ducei =

Scientific classification
- Domain: Eukaryota
- Kingdom: Animalia
- Phylum: Arthropoda
- Class: Insecta
- Order: Lepidoptera
- Superfamily: Noctuoidea
- Family: Erebidae
- Subfamily: Arctiinae
- Genus: Eucyclopera
- Species: E. ducei

Binomial name
- Eucyclopera ducei (Schaus, 1924)

Synonyms
- Cisthene ducei Schaus, 1924

Species of moth

Eucyclopera ducei is a moth of the family Erebidae. It is found in Colombia.
