= Cyprus (disambiguation) =

Cyprus is an island country in West Asia, geopolitically a part of Southern Europe, in the east Mediterranean, officially known as the Republic of Cyprus.

Cyprus may also refer to:

== Places ==
- British Cyprus (1878–1960)
- Cyprus (European Parliament constituency), created in 2004
- Northern Cyprus, a self-declared state
- Cyprus (island), the island in eastern Mediterranean
- Cyprus, London, an area of London, United Kingdom, named after the island
- Kingdom of Cyprus (1192–1489)
- Roman Cyprus, a small senatorial province within the Roman Empire

== Transportation ==
- Cyprus (ship), three merchant ships
- Cyprus Airways, from 2017, the current flag carrier airline of Cyprus
- Cyprus Airways (1947–2015), the former flag carrier airline of Cyprus
- Cyprus DLR station, a metropolitan transport station serving the area of Cyprus, London (see above)
- 45605 Cyprus, a British LMS Jubilee Class locomotive

== Other uses ==
- Cyprus (domino game)
- Cyprus (wine)
- Tabby cat, once known as Cyprus cat in England

== See also ==
- Cy-près doctrine, an equitable legal doctrine dealing with charitable trusts
- Cypress (disambiguation)
- Cypris (disambiguation)
