= Lambula fuliginosa =

Scientific classification
- Kingdom: Animalia
- Phylum: Arthropoda
- Class: Insecta
- Order: Lepidoptera
- Superfamily: Noctuoidea
- Family: Erebidae
- Subfamily: Arctiinae
- Genus: Lambula
- Species: L. fuliginosa

Binomial name
- Lambula fuliginosa (Walker, 1862)

Synonyms
- Lithosia fuliginosa Walker, 1862

Species of moth

Lambula fuliginosa is a moth of the family Erebidae. It was described by Francis Walker in 1862. It is found on Borneo. The habitat consists of montane forests, dipterocarp forests and lowland forests.
