= Lambula transcripta =

Scientific classification
- Domain: Eukaryota
- Kingdom: Animalia
- Phylum: Arthropoda
- Class: Insecta
- Order: Lepidoptera
- Superfamily: Noctuoidea
- Family: Erebidae
- Subfamily: Arctiinae
- Genus: Lambula
- Species: L. transcripta

Binomial name
- Lambula transcripta (T. P. Lucas, 1890)

Synonyms
- Tigriodes transcripta T. P. Lucas, 1890

Species of moth

Lambula transcripta is a moth of the family Erebidae. It was described by Thomas Pennington Lucas in 1890. It is found in Queensland, Australia.
