= Lambula hypopolius =

Scientific classification
- Domain: Eukaryota
- Kingdom: Animalia
- Phylum: Arthropoda
- Class: Insecta
- Order: Lepidoptera
- Superfamily: Noctuoidea
- Family: Erebidae
- Subfamily: Arctiinae
- Genus: Lambula
- Species: L. hypopolius

Binomial name
- Lambula hypopolius (Rothschild, 1916)

Synonyms
- Philenora hypopolius Rothschild, 1916; Holocraspedon hypopolius; Utriculofera tetrastigmata Rothschild, 1916

Species of moth

Lambula hypopolius is a moth of the family Erebidae first described by Walter Rothschild in 1916. It is found along the coastline of northern New Guinea, from Papua New Guinea and Karkar Island to Batanta Island.
