= Cypress Lake (Lafayette, Louisiana) =

Reservoir in southern Louisiana, U.S.

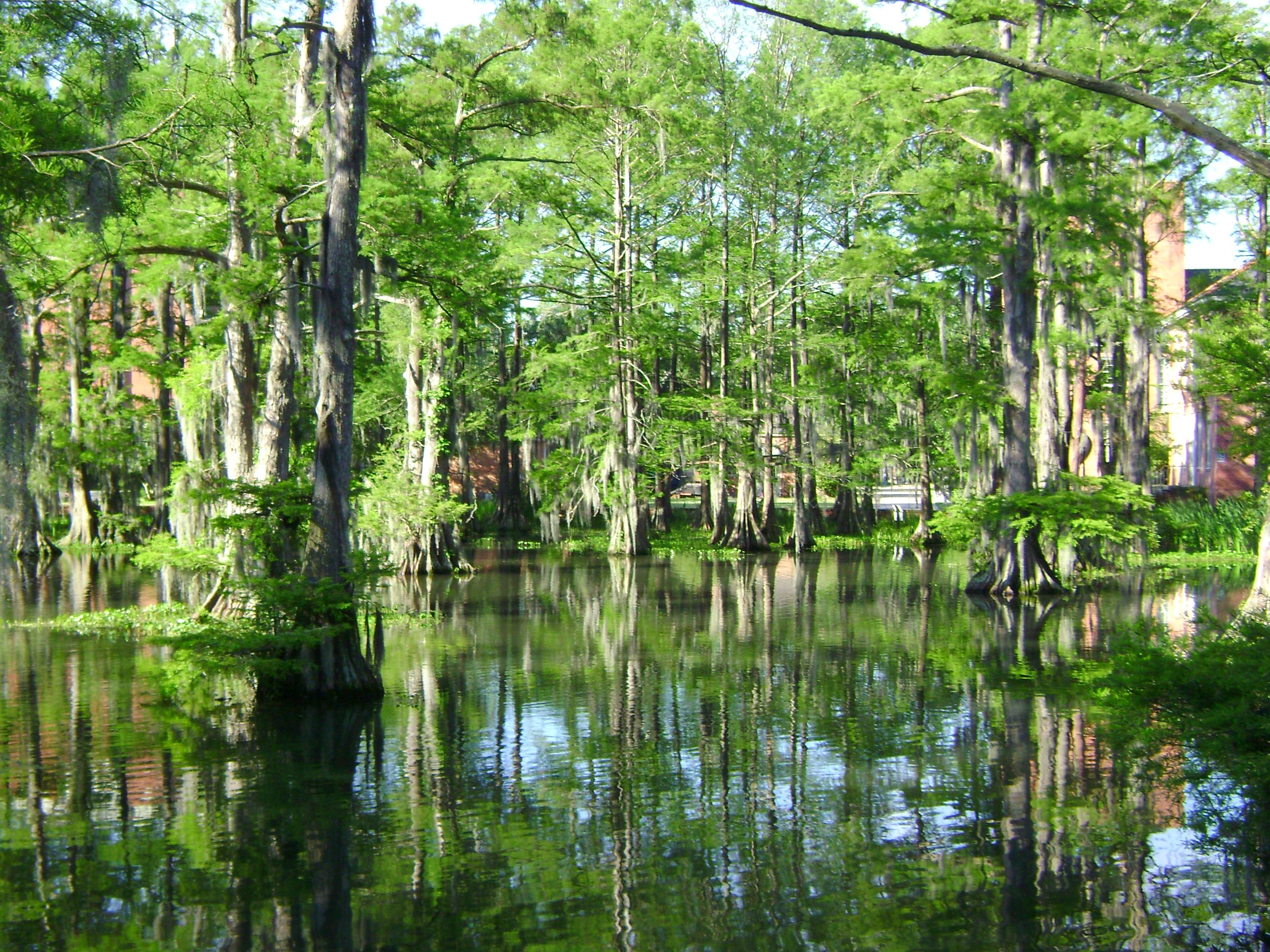

- Location within Louisiana Location within the United States
- Location: Lafayette, Louisiana
- Coordinates: 30.2136°N 92.0180°W
- Type: Manmade
- Basin countries: United States
- Surface area: 2 acres (0.8 ha)

Cypress Lake is a 2-acre (0.8 ha) swamp-like lake in the heart of the University of Louisiana at Lafayette campus that started as a prehistoric bison wallow. Today it is a unique university landmark that is a habitat for native irises, alligators, turtles, birds and fish, as well as a hangout for students and a point of interest for tourists visiting Lafayette, Louisiana. Cypress Lake is casually called "The Swamp," which is also the nickname of the Louisiana Ragin' Cajuns football stadium, officially named Cajun Field.

== History ==
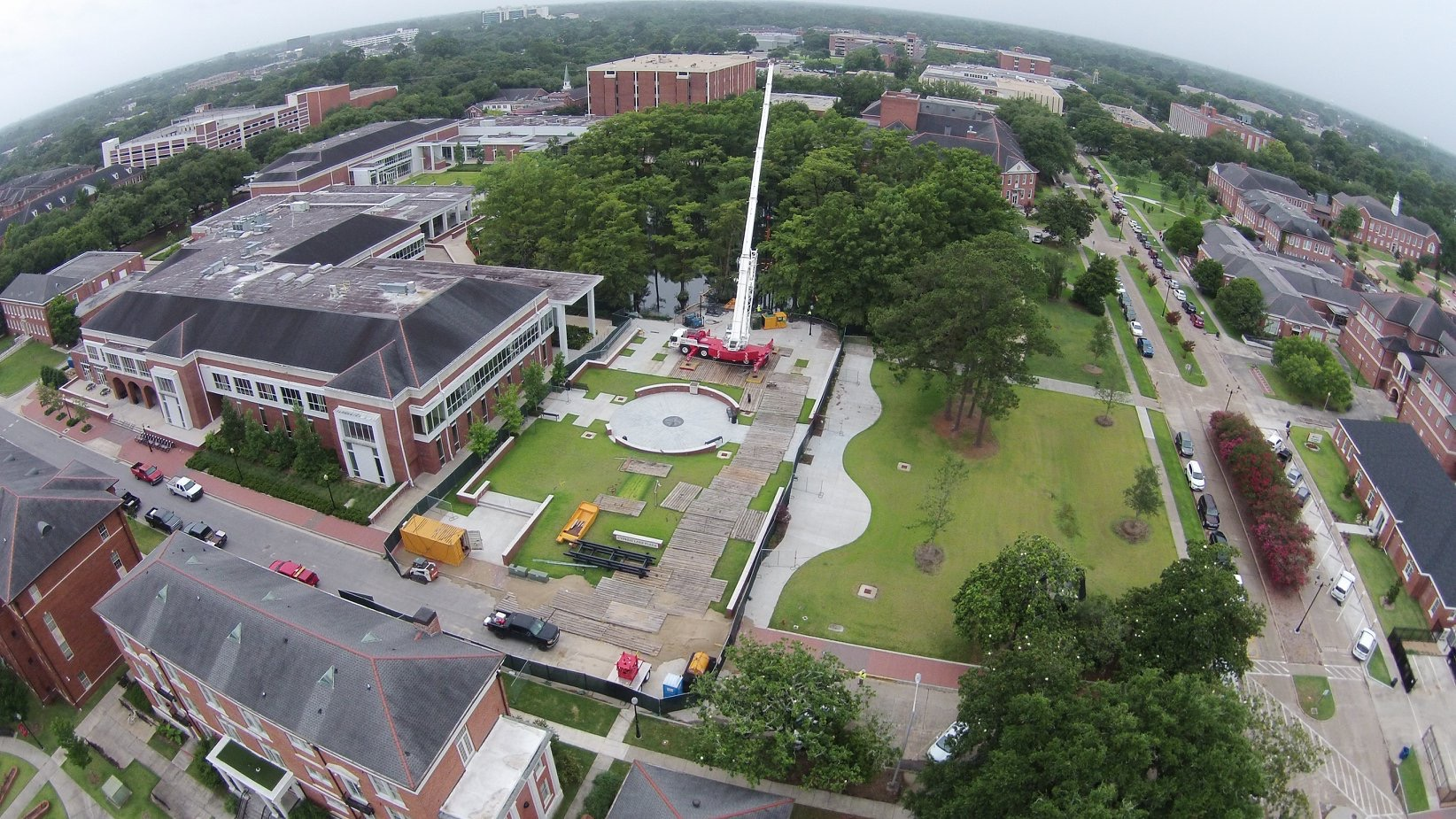
Overhead view of Cypress Lake, illustrating its natural makeup within an urban setting. Cypress Lake Plaza (under construction at the time of this photo) is located in the bottom of the picture, with the Student Union to the left, and wrapping around the lake

In prehistoric times, bison herds wandering through the area stopped in the shade of the cypress grove, pawing and stomping at the ground. Eventually a depression in the ground formed from the bison. The grove, called a trou de taureau in Cajun French, or “bull hole,” began to retain water and form a pond.

UL (est. 1898) grew up around the pond. Initially the university fenced it in to use as a pig pen and feeding area for its instructional farm. In the early 1920s, the pig pen was drained to return the 63 cypress trees into the newly named Cypress Grove. The university used the grove as an open-air theater for Shakespearean productions, music and dance programs. Commencement exercises were held beneath the cypress canopy in 1935 for the first time and several subsequent years when the weather permitted.

In the early 1940s, some agriculture faculty members proposed converting the grove back into a pond, because they were concerned a lack of water could harm the cypress trees. A pump was installed, the pond was refilled, and Cypress Grove became Cypress Lake.

An oak tree located south of Cypress Lake has a plaque paying tribute to Edwin Stephens, the first president of the university, which was then called Southwestern Louisiana Industrial Institute.

== Alternate theory ==
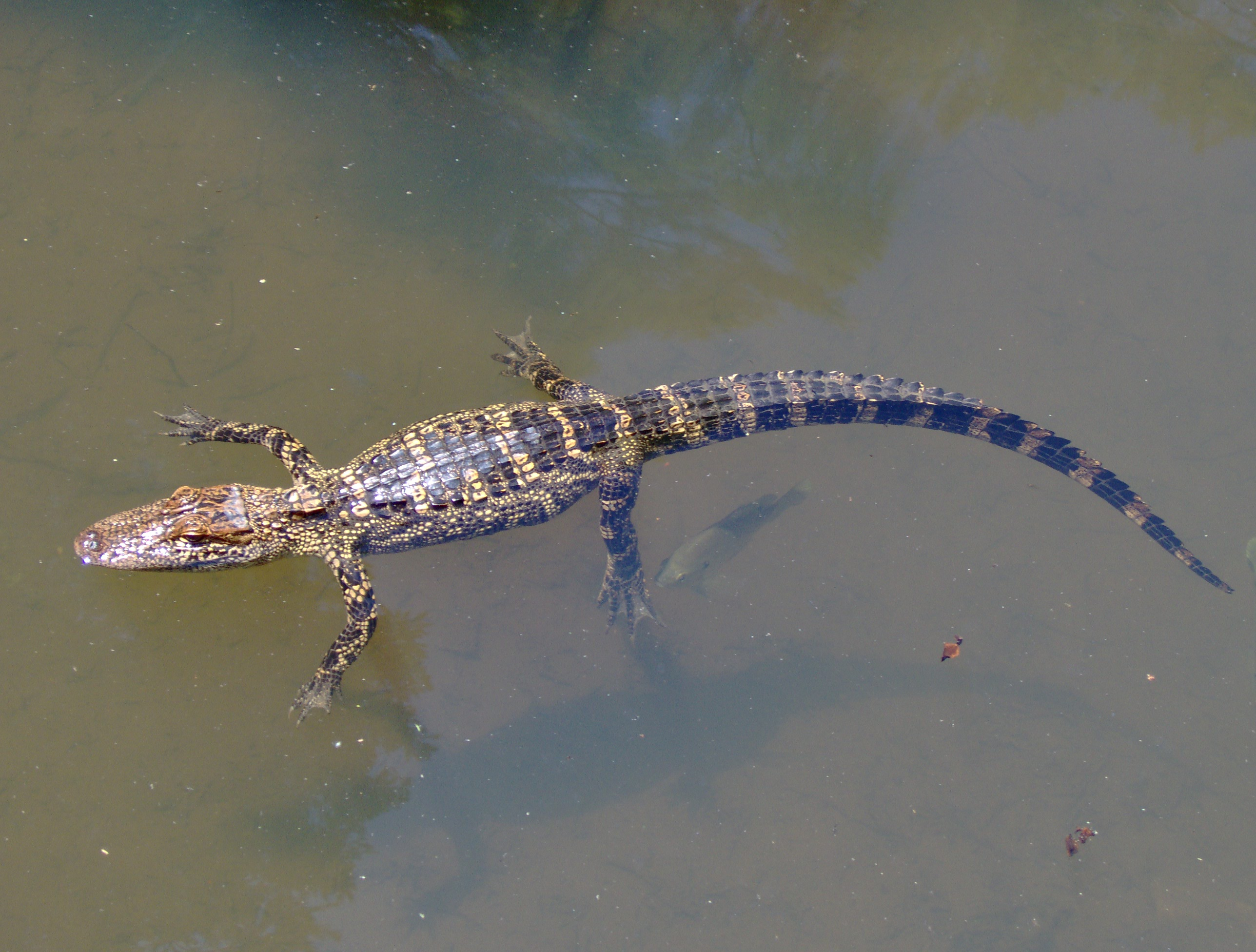
An alligator in The Swamp.

An alternate theory exists to explain why the grove was converted back to a small lake. This one is counter to the theory that the trees needed water. Either could be correct.

The differing view is that the university created the lake as a precautionary measure during World War II. Two women with strong ties to the university, Maria Mario Mamalakis and Vesta Bourgeois, participated in the oral history project in which their memories of Cypress Lake were recorded in the mid-1980s.

“People didn’t realize that we were so near the gulf and had a lot of German submarines in the gulf area,” said Mamalakis, explaining why the university decided to create the lake. “It was a worry that we could even be bombed. It was Cypress Grove for many years, but they were afraid that we might need extra water in case of fire if a bomb had been dropped on campus.” Bourgeois concurred, adding that female students filled the swamp and conducted fire drills.

“They realized that if the Germans came to the gulf south of Abbeville they would bomb not us, but the vulnerable place, Baton Rouge,” Bourgeois explained. “If they had to come back with bombs (in their airplanes), they would not go back to the ship, but would drop them at some vulnerable place, and Southwestern would have been one.

“So they began preparing for this type thing, and they saw that there was no water. So they put water (in the grove), and we began teaching girls at the gym bucket brigades. So we had ladders, and an obstacle course for the girls to run, realizing that all of our men went into the service, and the others were in the National Guard or volunteers, so that the women would have to do these sorts of things. That’s how Cypress Grove was filled. Not many people knew that.”

Although the grove was a popular gathering place and was even used as a lovers' lane, students accepted the swamp because it was part of the war effort, according to Bruce Turner, a UL Lafayette history professor and head of the special collections at Edith Garland Dupré Library.

“I’m sure if they made the case that it was being done for war preparedness, then for patriotic reasons, people would accept that,” Turner said. “It was right in the middle of World War II, and everyone was concerned. Everybody was willing to make sacrifices for the war.”

== Traditions ==
Due to its central location on the main campus, a rich series of university traditions have developed through the years featuring the lake:

Lagniappe Week
"Lagniappe," meaning 'something extra’, is a week of activities planned solely to add to the enjoyment of life as a UL student. The week is culminated with “Lagniappe Day,” which consists of numerous events centered around, or in, Cypress Lake:

The Annual Crawfish Boil: a popular ritual throughout the region, many students also enjoy crawfish boils throughout the season. However, what is easily the biggest and most anticipated boil of the year for them is the one staged by the University Program Council, on Lagniappe Day. Over 20,000 pounds of crawfish are boiled and served for free to UL students to enjoy in the newly constructed Cypress Lake Plaza, as well as the outdoor seating areas of the “U.” Of course there is also music and dancing as well as fun and laughter.

Canoe through Cypress Lake: students have the rare opportunity to take a quick paddle through the lake to enjoy the view from a totally different perspective....not to mention also getting a chance to be ‘up close and personal’ with the alligators, turtles, fish and other denizens of the lake.

Canoe Races: students can also participate in the annual canoe race on the lake. Sixteen teams of 4-6 people race for the title of champion.

Lake Jump: another lake tradition during Lagniappe Week, the jump began in 1977 when student Philip Beridon took the first plunge, and the yearly tradition continued until his untimely death in 2006. A memorial jump took place in 2007, and beginning in 2008 a new student performs the task each year, taking the plunge feet-first into the murky waters of the lake.

Ring Ceremony

Established in 2012, all current and past graduates that have ordered rings are formally recognized and presented their ring by UL President, Dr. Joseph Savoie, on the stage in Angelle Hall. However, the rings spend the night before the ceremony on Cypress Lake in a custom-built, metal pirogue, escorted there by members of UL’s Army ROTC, and then guarded by students.

== Student Union ==
Completed in 2015, the 178,000-square-foot compound dwarfs the former student union, and was built to wrap around Cypress Lake. The “U” provides meeting spaces and offices for student groups, as well as a post office, a movie theater, coffee shops and cafeteria with seating to accommodate over 600 students. Most of the second floor is dedicated to dining space, and has views of the lake, the newly constructed Cypress Lake Plaza and the Rose Garden dorms along Boucher Street. Also, the landscaping for the new U included terraces all along the lake, providing additional dining space for students, faculty, visitors, etc.

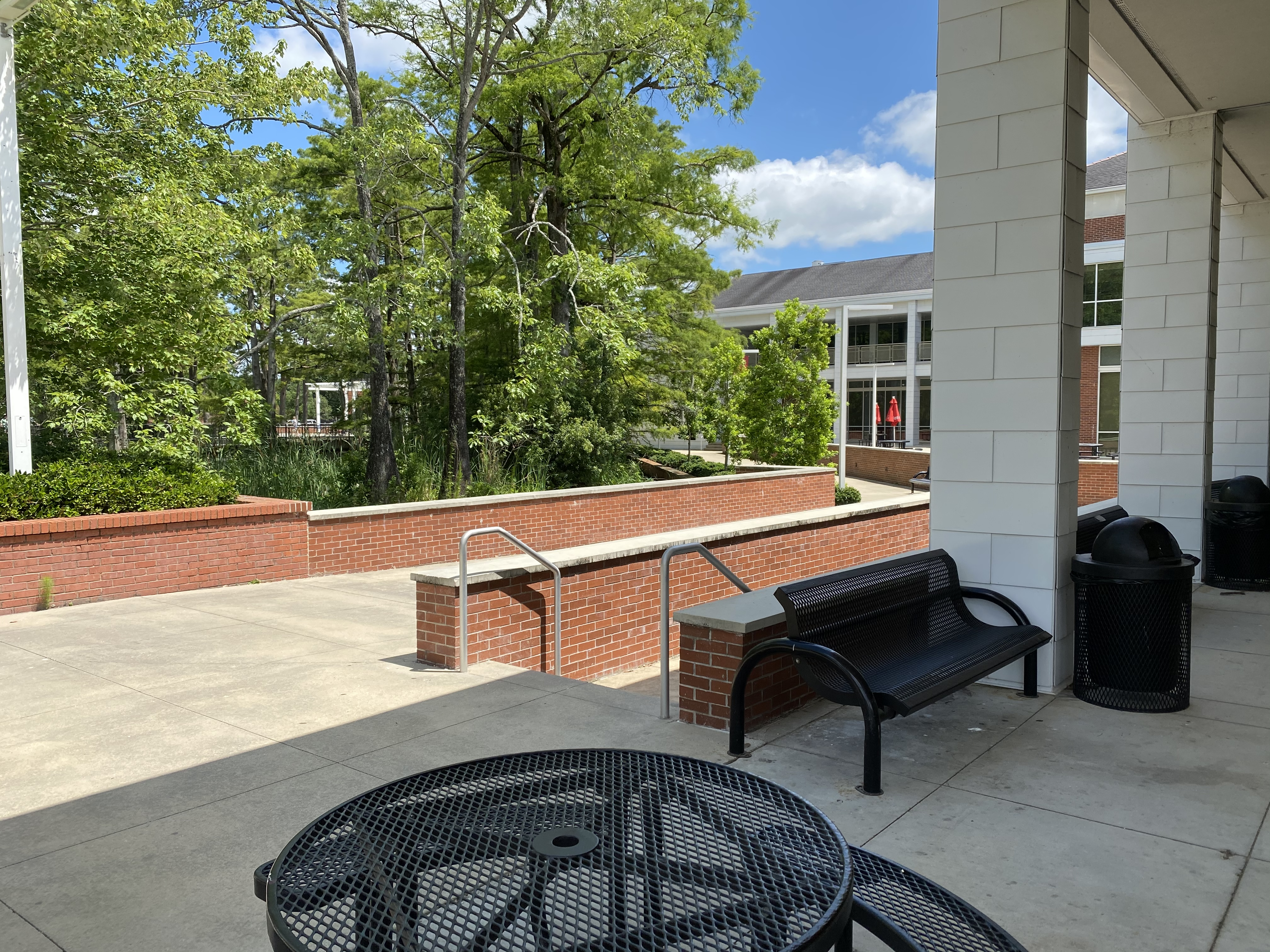

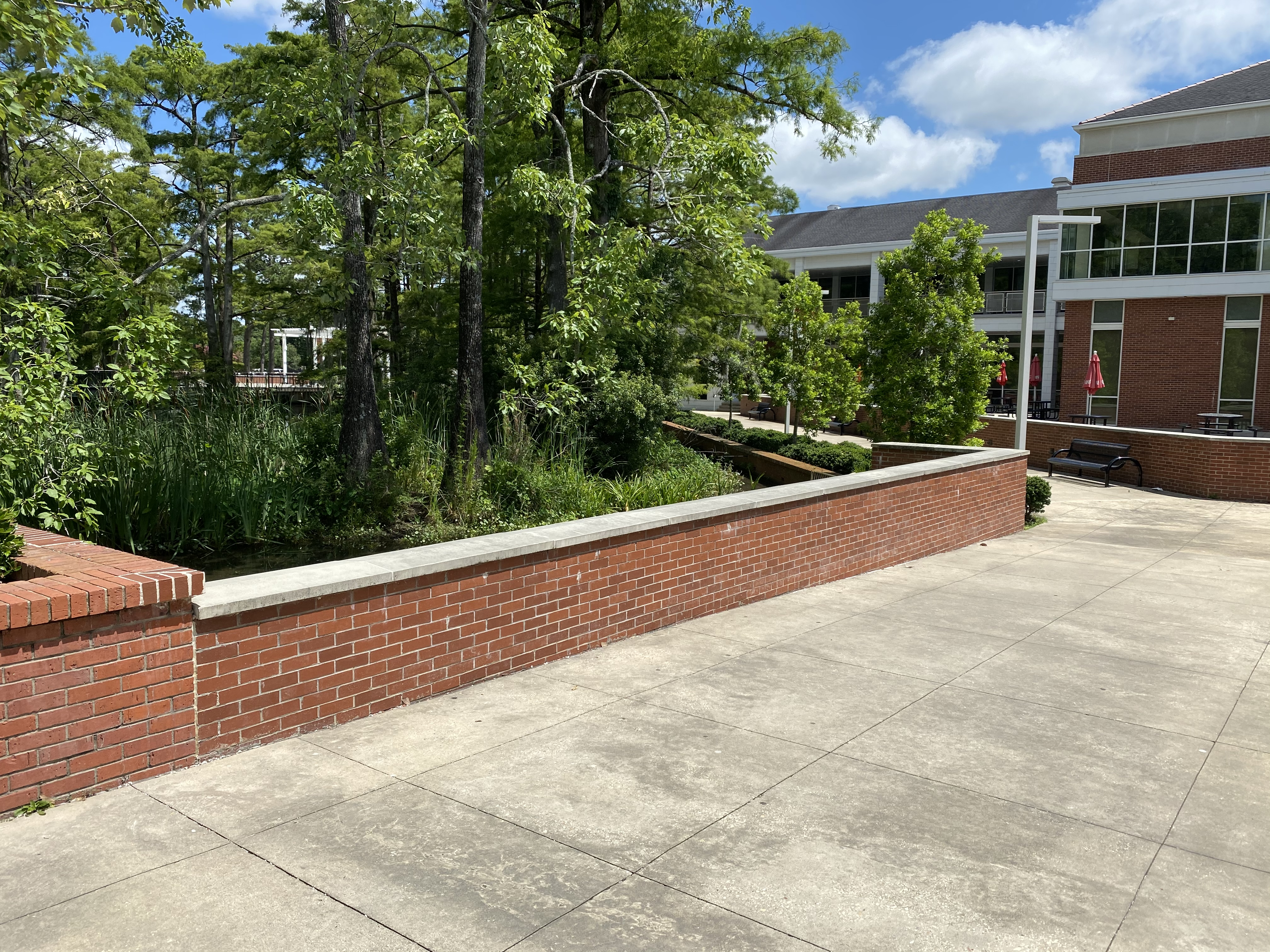

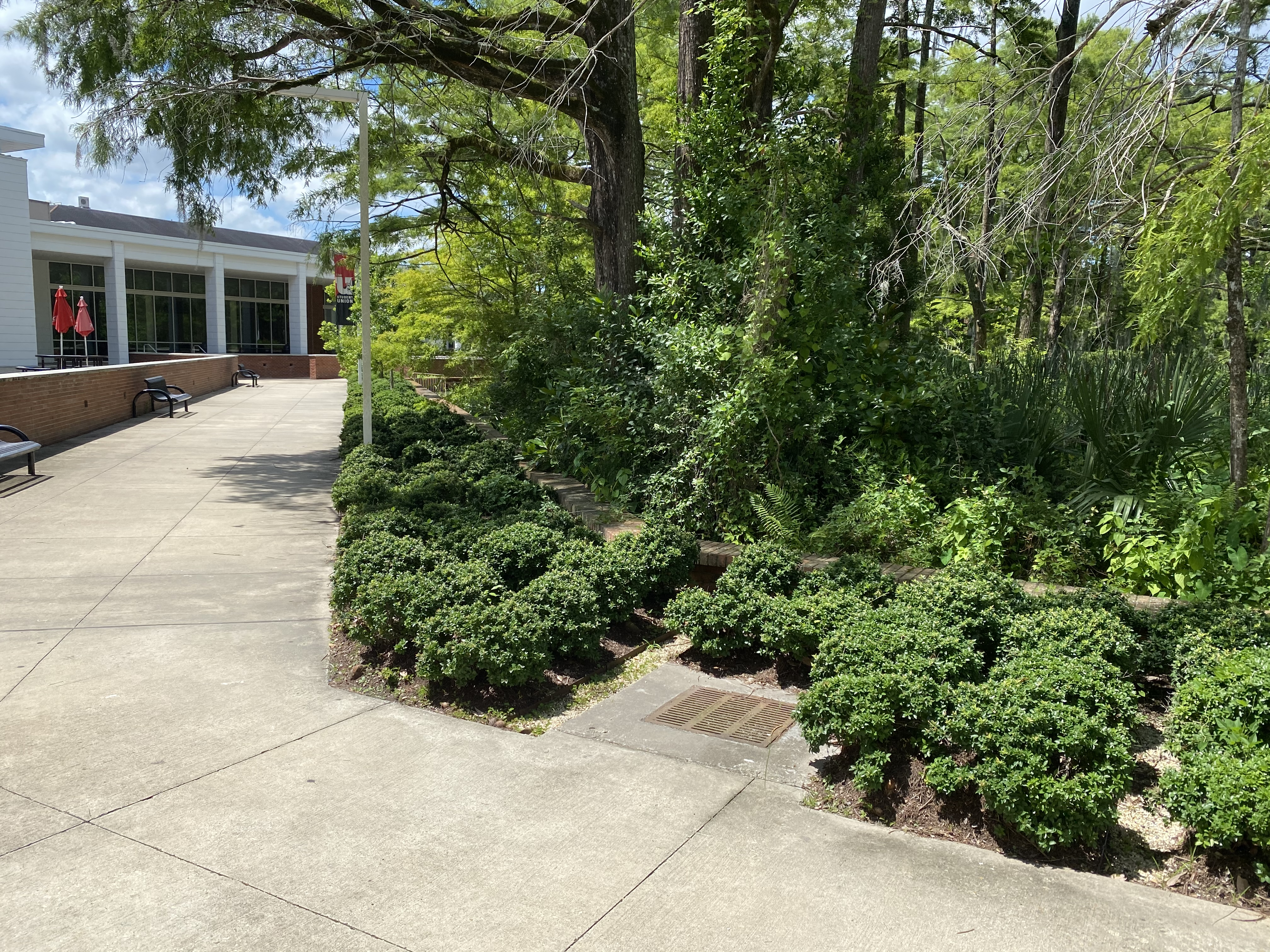

Views of Student Union terraces around the lake

== Cypress Lake Plaza ==
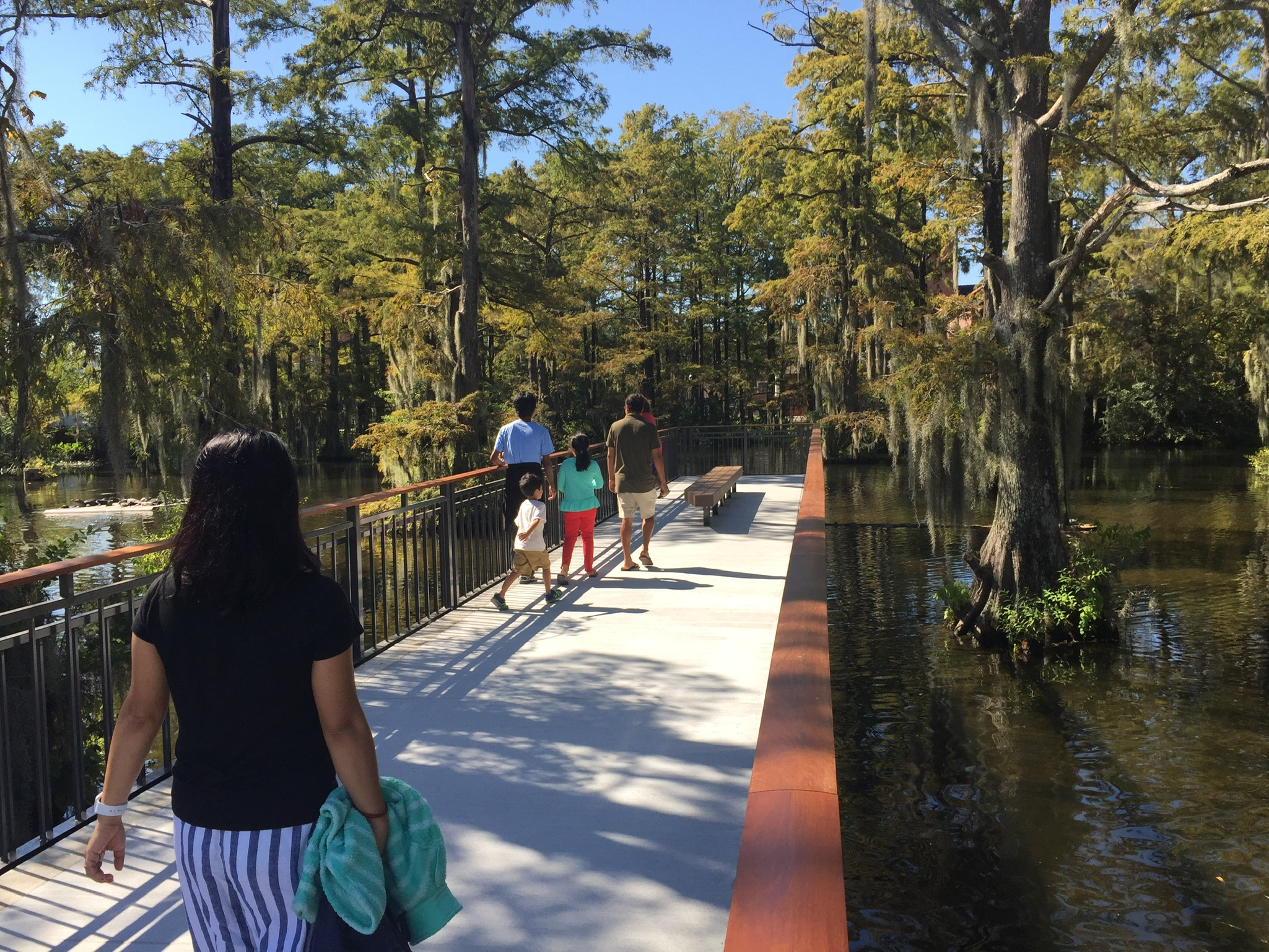
New pier extending from the Plaza into the lake.

Following the demolition of the former Student Union Complex (Olivier, Corona & Guillory Halls) located along Hebrard Boulevard and Boucher Street, a new green space was completed in that area in early 2018, and named “Cypress Lake Plaza.” The Plaza includes an amphitheater with a podium and stage that affords speakers and presenters a scenic spot to address campus crowds. Further enhancements to the Plaza were completed in October 2019. These improvements include arbors over a portion of the Plaza, as well as a pier that extends into the lake. Future plans include extending the lake on the Hebrard side.

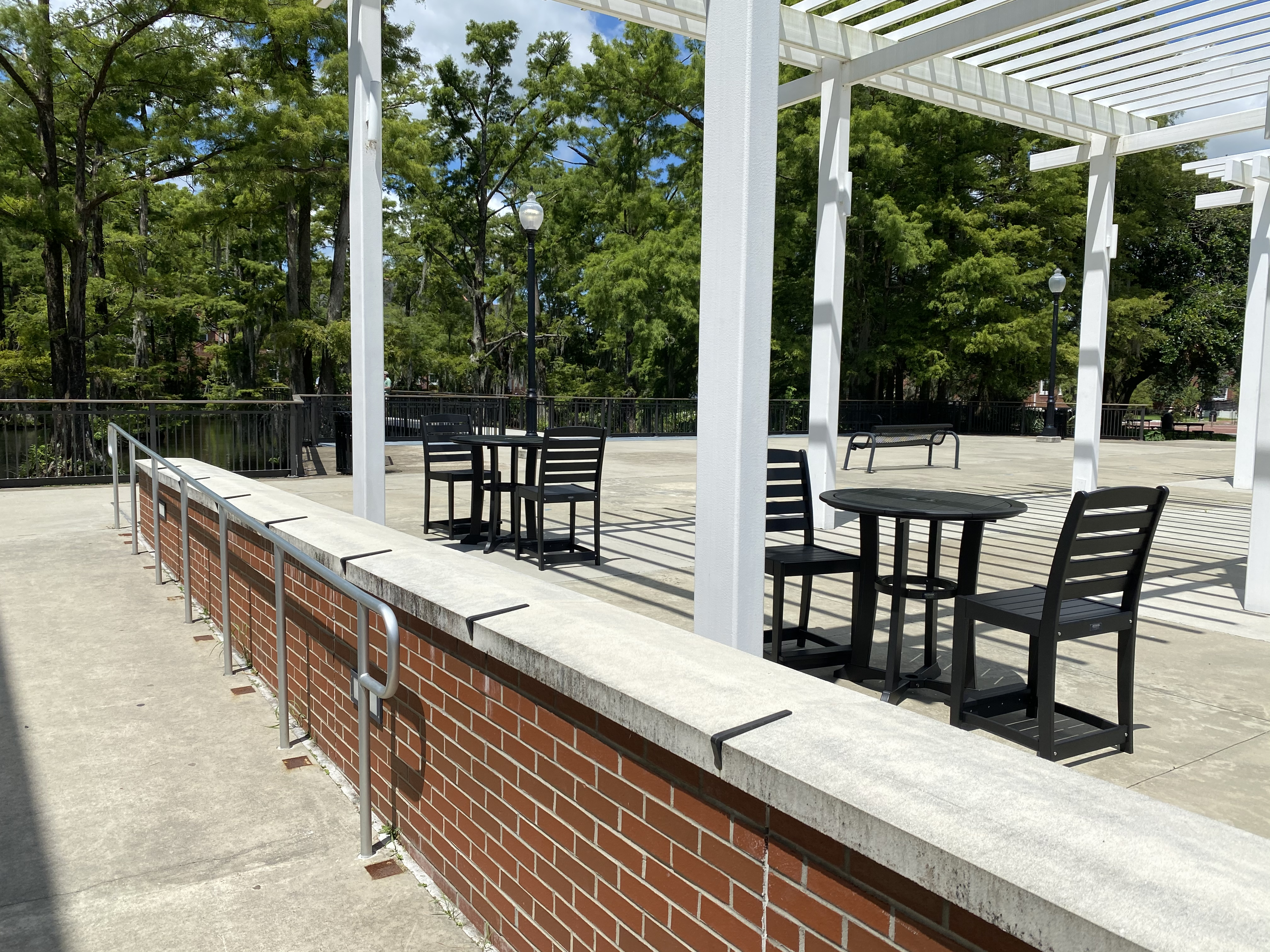
View of plaza looking towards the lake

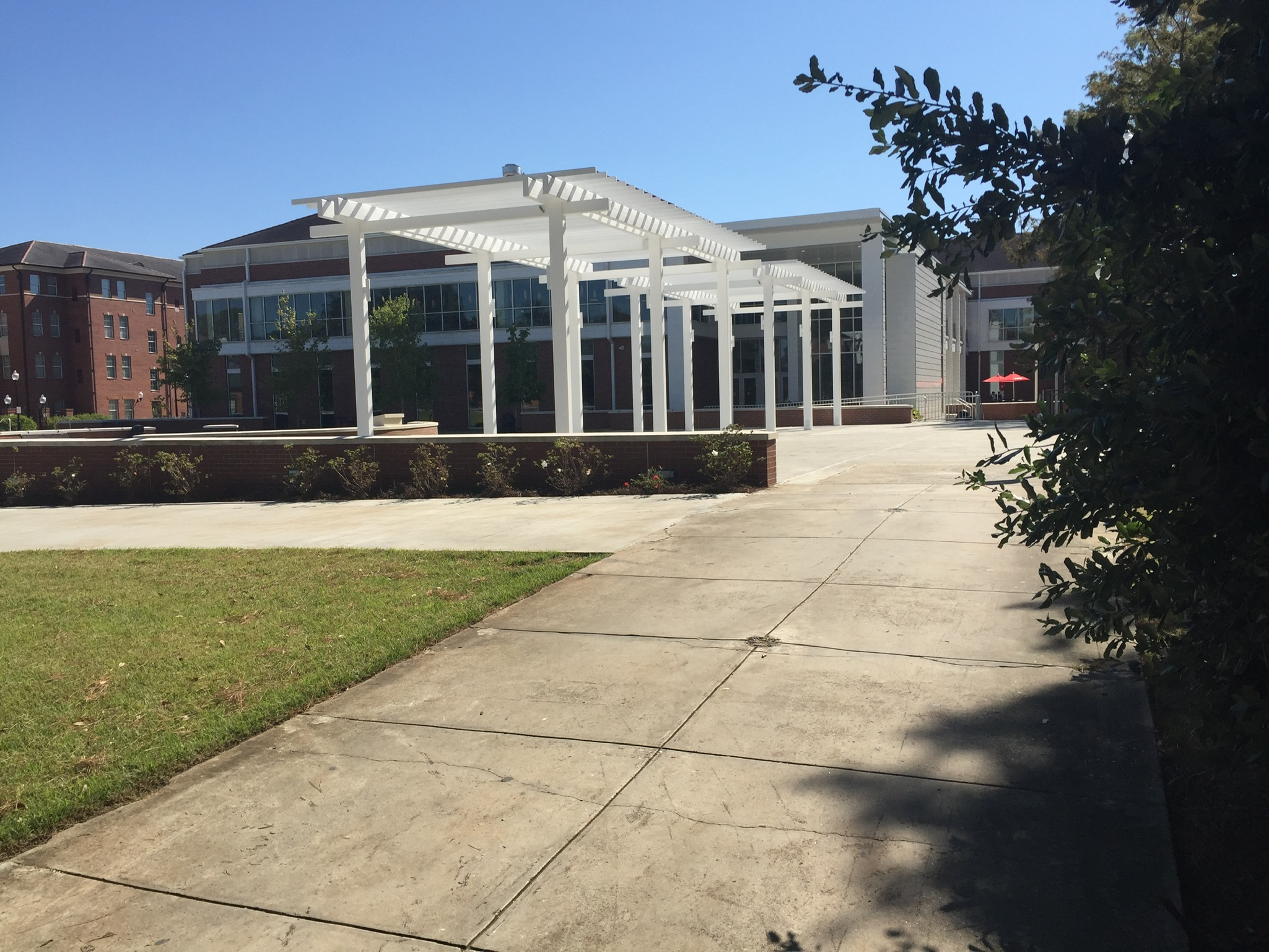
New arbor over the Plaza.

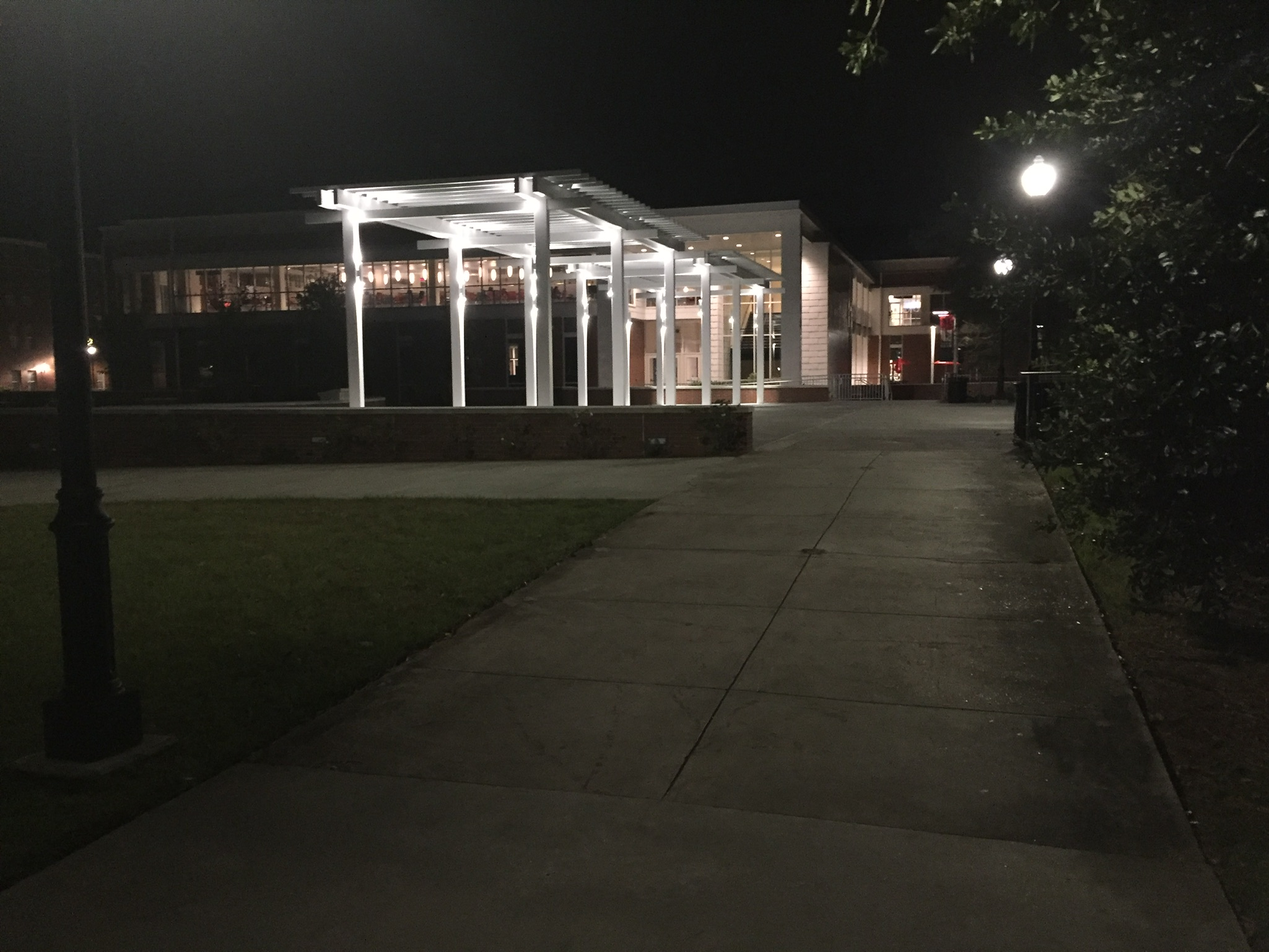
Night view of arbor

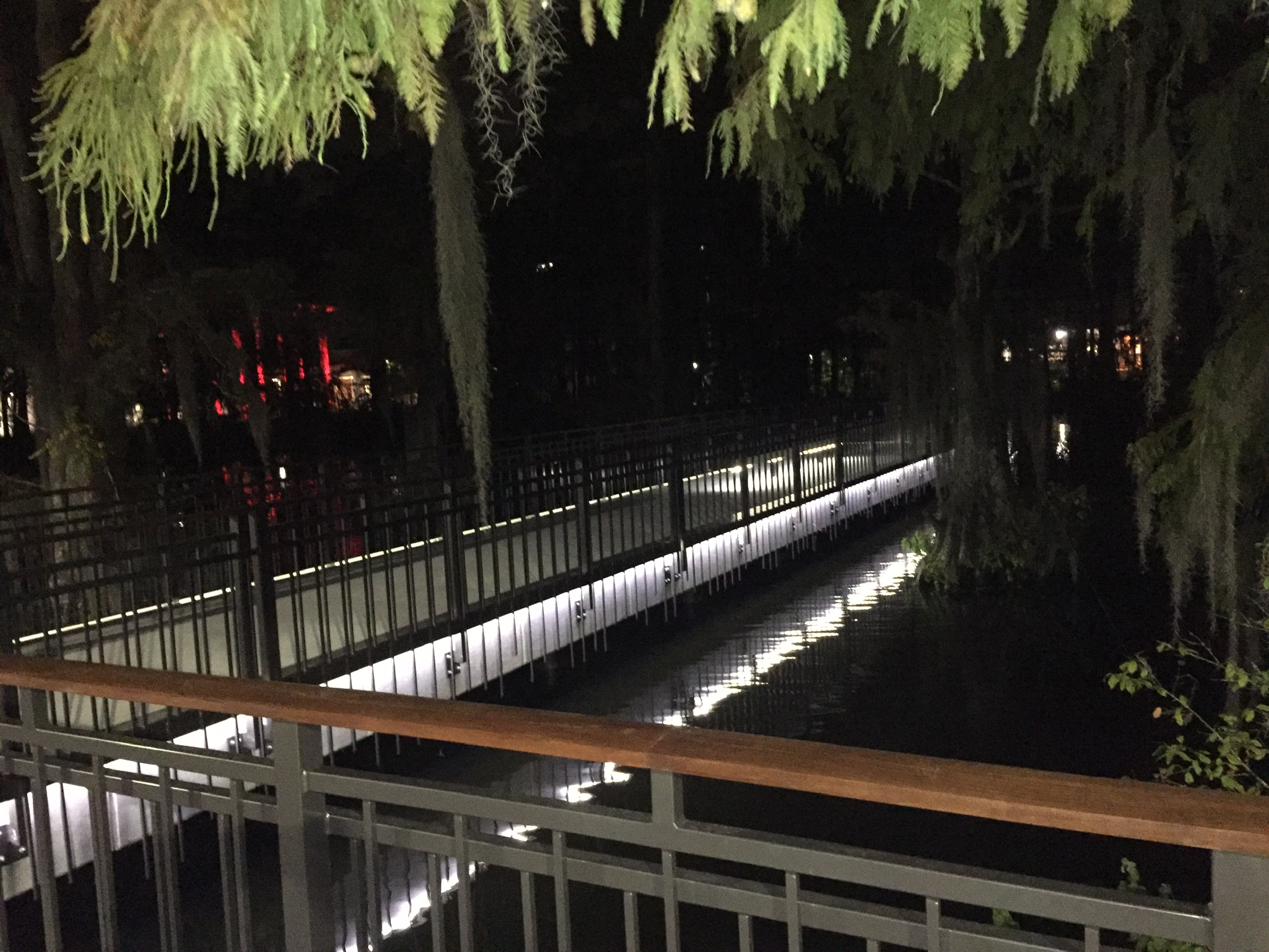
Night view of pier.

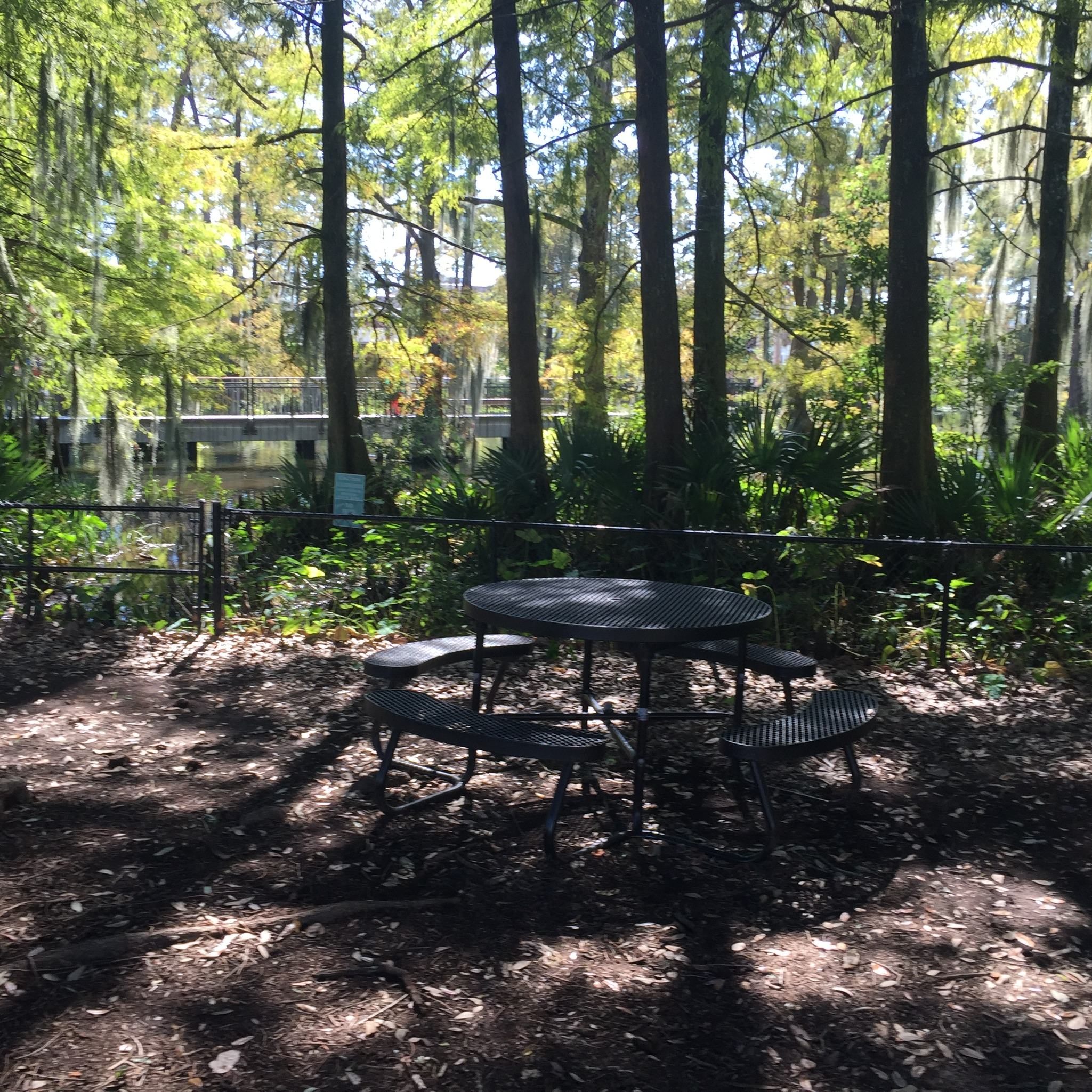
Picnic table at Cypress Lake edge, with new pier in distance

== Notable media references ==
- In 1962, Life magazine photographed students ice skating on the lake when it froze over.
- In the late 1980s, Cypress Lake was a question on the game show Jeopardy! under a category of college landmarks.

== Sources ==
1. article from The Advertiser
2. Louisiana Digital Library
3. University of Louisiana at Lafayette Archived 2012-03-06 at the Wayback Machine
4. articles from The Advocate and The Vermilion
