= Darantasia cuprea =

Scientific classification
- Domain: Eukaryota
- Kingdom: Animalia
- Phylum: Arthropoda
- Class: Insecta
- Order: Lepidoptera
- Superfamily: Noctuoidea
- Family: Erebidae
- Subfamily: Arctiinae
- Genus: Darantasia
- Species: D. cuprea

Binomial name
- Darantasia cuprea (Rothschild, 1912)

Synonyms
- Ilema cuprea Rothschild, 1912; Lambula cuprea; Lambula dampierensis Rothschild, 1916; Lambula triangulum Gaede, 1925

Species of moth

Darantasia cuprea is a moth of the family Erebidae. It was described by Walter Rothschild in 1912. It is found in New Guinea.
