= Cyprus (ship) =

Several vessels have borne the name Cyprus, named for the island of Cyprus:

- Cyprus (1816 ship) was a ship launched at Sunderland in 1816 that in 1829 was seized and eventually scuttled by convicts that she was transporting from Hobart Town to Port Macquarie
- SS Cyprus was a lake freighter that was launched in August 1907 and that sank during a gale storm on Lake Superior on 11 October 1907
- MV Cyprus C, launched in 1944 as the Empire Fable, was an Empire F type coaster, renamed Cyprus C in 1948 and later renamed Yvonne Olivier (1950), Antonios (1954), and Copetrole I (1958)
