= Cypress Creek (Logan Creek tributary) =

Stream in the American state of Missouri

Coordinates: 36.6033914°N 90.6959513°W

Cypress Creek is a stream in Ripley County in the U.S. state of Missouri. It is a tributary of Logan Creek.

Cypress Creek most likely was so named on account of cypress trees in the area.

== See also ==
- List of rivers of Missouri
