= Cypress Hills =

Cypress Hills may refer to:

== Places ==
=== United States ===
- Cypress Hills (New York City), a subsection in Brooklyn’s East New York neighborhood of New York, United States

=== Canada ===
- Cypress Hills (Canada), a region in the provinces of Alberta and Saskatchewan, Canada
- Cypress Hills Interprovincial Park, located in Cypress Hills, Canada
- Cypress Hills (electoral district), a provincial electoral district for the Legislative Assembly of Saskatchewan, Canada
- Cypress Hills—Grasslands, electoral district in Saskatchewan, Canada
- Cypress Hills Formation, landform

== Other uses ==
- Cypress Hills station, a New York City Subway station
- Cypress Hills Cemetery, a non-sectarian cemetery located in Brooklyn
- Cypress Hills National Cemetery, a United States National Cemetery located in Brooklyn
- Cypress Hills Houses, a public housing in the East New York neighborhood of Brooklyn
- Cypress Hills Massacre

== See also ==
- Cypress Hill, a hip-hop band
