= Eucyclopera cypris =

Scientific classification
- Domain: Eukaryota
- Kingdom: Animalia
- Phylum: Arthropoda
- Class: Insecta
- Order: Lepidoptera
- Superfamily: Noctuoidea
- Family: Erebidae
- Subfamily: Arctiinae
- Genus: Eucyclopera
- Species: E. cypris

Binomial name
- Eucyclopera cypris (H. Druce, 1894)

Synonyms
- Ruscino cypris Druce, 1894; Cisthene cypris; Eudesmia cypris

Species of moth

Eucyclopera cypris is a moth of the subfamily Arctiinae first described by Herbert Druce in 1894. It is found in Mexico and Guatemala.
