= Eucyclopera minuta =

Scientific classification
- Domain: Eukaryota
- Kingdom: Animalia
- Phylum: Arthropoda
- Class: Insecta
- Order: Lepidoptera
- Superfamily: Noctuoidea
- Family: Erebidae
- Subfamily: Arctiinae
- Genus: Eucyclopera
- Species: E. minuta

Binomial name
- Eucyclopera minuta (Rothschild, 1912)

Synonyms
- Lambula minuta Rothschild, 1912

Species of moth

Eucyclopera minuta is a moth of the family Erebidae first described by Walter Rothschild in 1912. It is found in Papua New Guinea.

The length of the forewings is about 7 mm. The forewings are white, the basal half of the wing brownish sooty grey from the middle of the cell to the hind margin. There is a broad subterminal and a narrow terminal line, both are pale grey. The hindwings are greyish white.
