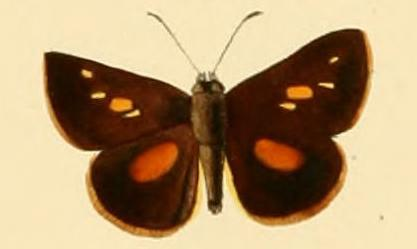
- Dalla caenides

Scientific classification
- Kingdom: Animalia
- Phylum: Arthropoda
- Class: Insecta
- Order: Lepidoptera
- Family: Hesperiidae
- Subfamily: Heteropterinae
- Genus: Dalla; Mabille, 1904

Synonyms
- Eumesia C. & R. Felder, [1867]; Della Hayward, 1934 (misspelling); Dala DeVries, 1983 (misspelling)

= Dalla (skipper) =

Genus of butterflies

Dalla is a genus of skippers in the family Hesperiidae.

== Species ==
The following species are recognised in the genus Dalla:

- Dalla agathocles (C. & R. Felder, 1867)
- Dalla austini A.D. Warren, 2011
- Dalla bubobon (Dyar, 1921)
- Dalla caicus (Hewitson, 1868)
- Dalla calaon (Hewitson, 1877)
- Dalla cocha Evans, 1955
- Dalla cola Bell, 1959
- Dalla costala Evans, 1955
- Dalla cupavia (Mabille, 1898)
- Dalla curia Evans, 1955
- Dalla cyprius (Mabille, 1898)
- Dalla cypselus (C. & R. Felder, 1867)
- Dalla dimidiatus (C. & R. Felder, 1867)
- Dalla diraspes (Hewitson, 1877)
- Dalla dividuum (Dyar, 1913)
- Dalla dognini (Mabille, 1889)
- Dalla dora Bell, 1947
- Dalla epiphaneus (C. & R. Felder, [1867])
- Dalla eryonas (Hewitson, 1877)
- Dalla faula (Godman, [1900])
- Dalla frater (Mabille, 1878)
- Dalla freemani Warren, 1997
- Dalla frontinia Evans, 1955
- Dalla gelus (Mabille, 1898)
- Dalla genes (Mabille, 1898)
- Dalla geon (Mabille, 1898)
- Dalla grovius (Mabille, 1898)
- Dalla hesperioides (C. & R. Felder, [1867])
- Dalla hilina (Butler, 1870)
- Dalla huanca Evans, 1955
- Dalla jelskyi (Erschoff, 1875)
- Dalla kemneri Steinhauser, 1991
- Dalla lalage (Godman, [1900])
- Dalla lenda Evans, 1955
- Dalla lethaea (Schaus, 1913)
- Dalla ligilla (Hewitson, 1877)
- Dalla lorda Evans, 1955
- Dalla mentor Evans, 1955
- Dalla merida Evans, 1955
- Dalla mesoxantha (Plötz, 1884)
- Dalla miser Evans, 1955
- Dalla nona Evans, 1955
- Dalla nubes Steinhauser, 1991
- Dalla octomaculata (Godman, [1900])
- Dalla orsines (Hewitson, 1877)
- Dalla oxaites (Hewitson, 1877)
- Dalla pincha Steinhauser, 1991
- Dalla polycrates (C. & R. Felder, 1867)
- Dalla pota Bell, 1959
- Dalla pulchra (Godman, [1900])
- Dalla quasca Bell, 1947
- Dalla ramirezi Freeman, 1969
- Dalla riza (Mabille, 1889)
- Dalla scylla (Mabille, 1898)
- Dalla semiargentea (C. & R. Felder, [1867])
- Dalla sepia Evans, 1955
- Dalla spica Hayward, 1939
- Dalla steinhauseri Freeman, 1991
- Dalla superargentea Viloria, Warren & Austin, 2008
- Dalla superior Draudt, 1923
- Dalla taza Evans, 1955
- Dalla thalia Evans, 1955
- Dalla vinca Evans, 1955
- Dalla wardi Steinhauser, 2002
- Dalla xantha Steinhauser, 1991

== Former species ==
Species formerly classified in the genus Dalla include:

- Dalla bos Steinhauser, 1991 transferred to Ladda bos (Steinhauser, 1991)
- Dalla caenides (Hewitson, 1868) transferred to Ladda caenides (Hewitson, 1868)
- Dalla calima Steinhauser, 1991 transferred to Ladda calima (Steinhauser, 1991)
- Dalla carnis Evans, 1955 transferred to Ladda carnis (Evans, 1955)
- Dalla celsus Steinhauser, 2002 transferred to Ladda celsus (Steinhauser, 2002)
- Dalla connexa Draudt, 1923 transferred to Ladda connexa (Draudt, 1923)
- Dalla crithote (Hewitson, 1874) transferred to Ladda crithote (Hewitson, 1874)
- Dalla cuadrada (Weeks, 1901) transferred to Ladda cuadrada (Weeks, 1901)
- Dalla cypselides Weeks, 1901 (nom. nud.)
- Dalla decca Evans, 1955 transferred to Ladda decca (Evans, 1955)
- Dalla disconnexa Steinhauser, 2002 transferred to Ladda disconnexa (Steinhauser, 2002)
- Dalla eburones (Hewitson, 1877) transferred to Ladda eburones (Hewitson, 1877)
- Dalla granites (Mabille, 1898) transferred to Ladda granites (Mabille, 1898)
- Dalla ibhara (Butler, 1870) transferred to Ladda ibhara (Butler, 1870)
- Dalla mars Evans, 1955 transferred to Ladda mars (Evans, 1955)
- Dalla mora Evans, 1955 transferred to Ladda mora (Evans, 1955)
- Dalla monospila (Mabille, 1898) transferred to Ladda monospila (Mabille, 1898)
- Dalla morva (Mabille, 1898) transferred to Ladda morva (Mabille, 1898)
- Dalla ochrolimbata Draudt, 1923 transferred to Ladda ochrolimbata (Draudt, 1923)
- Dalla pantha Evans, 1955 transferred to Ladda pantha (Evans, 1955)
- Dalla parma Evans, 1955 transferred to Ladda parma (Evans, 1955)
- Dalla pedro Steinhauser, 2002 transferred to Ladda pedro (Steinhauser, 2002)
- Dalla plancus (Hopffer, 1874) transferred to Ladda plancus (Hopffer, 1874)
- Dalla pura Steinhauser, 1991 transferred to Ladda pura (Steinhauser, 1991)
- Dalla puracensis Steinhauser, 1991 transferred to Ladda puracensis (Steinhauser, 1991)
- Dalla quadristriga (Mabille, 1889) transferred to Ladda quadristriga (Mabille, 1889)
- Dalla roeveri Miller L.D. & J.Y. Miller, 1972 transferred to Piruna roeveri (L.D. Miller & J.Y. Miller, 1972)
- Dalla rosea Evans, 1955 transferred to Ladda rosea (Evans, 1955)
- Dalla rubia Evans, 1955 transferred to Ladda rubia (Evans, 1955)
- Dalla seirocastnia Draudt, 1923 transferred to Ladda seirocastnia (Draudt, 1923)
- Dalla simplicis Steinhauser, 1991 transferred to Ladda simplicis (Steinhauser, 1991)
- Dalla ticidas (Mabille, 1898) transferred to Ladda ticidas (Mabille, 1898)
- Dalla tona Evans, 1955 transferred to Ladda tona (Evans, 1955)
- Dalla vista Steinhauser, 2002 transferred to Ladda vista (Steinhauser, 2002)
- Dalla xicca (Dyar, 1913) transferred to Ladda xicca (Dyar, 1913)
