= Rubia (disambiguation) =

Rubia is a genus of flowering plant.

Rubia may also refer to:

== People ==
=== Surname ===
- Charles Rubia (1923–2019), Kenyan politician and mayor of Nairobi
- José Rubia Barcia (1914–1997)
- Maria Rubia (born 1980), British singer-model and TV personality
- Nya de la Rubia (born 1986), Spanish singer-actress

=== Given name ===
- Rubia Syed (born 1994), Indian cricketer

== Music ==
- Rubia (1996), an album by Armik
- "La Rubia", a 2019 single by Omar Montes

== Other uses ==
- Rubiá, a municipality in Orense, Spain
- Victoria Rubia, a Spanish automobile
- Ladda rubia (L. rubia), a species of butterfly

== See also ==
- Rubial (disambiguation)
- Rubias (disambiguation)
