= Arhopala axina =

Scientific classification
- Kingdom: Animalia
- Phylum: Arthropoda
- Class: Insecta
- Order: Lepidoptera
- Family: Lycaenidae
- Subfamily: Theclinae
- Tribe: Arhopalini
- Genus: Arhopala
- Species: A. axina

Binomial name
- Arhopala axina Evans, 1957

Species of butterfly

Arhopala axina is a butterfly in the family Lycaenidae. It was discovered by William Harry Evans in 1957. It is found in Papua New Guinea. This species is monotypic.

== Description ==
The upperside is similar to Arhopala arta. The underside differs from arta, but the tornal area is much darker.
