= Arhopala irma =

Scientific classification
- Kingdom: Animalia
- Phylum: Arthropoda
- Clade: Pancrustacea
- Class: Insecta
- Order: Lepidoptera
- Family: Lycaenidae
- Genus: Arhopala
- Species: A. irma

Binomial name
- Arhopala irma Fruhstorfer, 1914

Synonyms
- Narathura irma

Species of butterfly

Arhopala irma is a butterfly in the family Lycaenidae. It was discovered by Hans Fruhstorfer in 1914. It is found in Indonesia and Papua New Guinea.

== Description ==
It is similar to Arhopala thamyras, but its wings have a more pointed shape. The tail is shorter than thamyras, with whitish spots at the base. The veins are dusted blackish.

== Subspecies ==
Three subspecies are recognized-

- Arhopala irma irma (Fruhstorfer, 1914)
- Arhopala irma purpura (Evans, 1957) - Roon Island, from ssp. irma by non-blackened veins
- Arhopala irma kotaroi (Rawlins et al., 2018) - shiny blue above with broad black borders, underside drab green
