= Dalla cocha =

Scientific classification
- Kingdom: Animalia
- Phylum: Arthropoda
- Clade: Pancrustacea
- Class: Insecta
- Order: Lepidoptera
- Family: Hesperiidae
- Genus: Dalla
- Species: D. cocha

Binomial name
- Dalla cocha Evans, 1955

Species of butterfly

Dalla cocha, commonly known as the cochabamba skipperling, is a species of butterfly in the family Hesperiidae and belonging to the subfamily Heteropterinae. It is found geographically throughout Bolivia and Peru.

It has dark brown upperside wings with a white patch on each hindwings and three unevenly sized spots on the upper wings. The underside wings are a lighter shade of brown and match the upper wing patterning, though they have more white on the hindwings.
