= Dalla vinca =

Scientific classification
- Kingdom: Animalia
- Phylum: Arthropoda
- Class: Insecta
- Order: Lepidoptera
- Family: Hesperiidae
- Genus: Dalla
- Species: D. vinca

Binomial name
- Dalla vinca Evans, 1955

Species of butterfly

Dalla vinca is a species of butterfly in the family Hesperiidae. It is found in Peru.
