= Decca =

Decca may refer to:

== Music ==
- Decca Records or Decca Music Group, record label
- Decca Gold, classical music record label owned by Universal Music Group
- Decca Broadway, musical theater record label
- Decca Studios, recording facility in West Hampstead, England
- London Decca, maker of turntable tonearms and cartridges
- Decca tree, microphone recording system

== People ==
=== Given name or nickname ===
- Decca Aitkenhead, English journalist, writer and broadcaster
- Jessica "Decca" Mitford, British writer and activist

=== Surname ===
- Grace Decca (born 1966), Cameroonian singer and producer
- Marie Decca (1859 – unknown), American opera singer
- Mpundi Decca, Congolese guitarist

== Other ==
- Decca: The Letters of Jessica Mitford, 2006 book by Jessica Mitford
- Decca Navigator System, defunct marine and aeronautical navigation system
- Decca Radar, later Racal-Decca Marine, a defunct marine electronics manufacturer
- Decca Sports Ground, cricket ground in London, England
- Decca, old spelling of Dhaka, capital of Bangladesh
- Ladda decca, species of butterfly in the family Hesperiidae

== See also ==
- Deca (disambiguation)
- Deccan (disambiguation), terms related to the Deccan Plateau in southern India
