= Hilina =

Hilina may refer to:

- Dalla hilina, butterfly in the family Hesperiidae, found in Venezuela
- Hilina Berhanu Degefa, Ethiopian women's rights activist
- Hilina Slump, section of the Big Island of Hawaii
