= Dalla octomaculata =

Eight-spotted skipper

Conservation status
- Data Deficient (IUCN 2.3)

Scientific classification
- Kingdom: Animalia
- Phylum: Arthropoda
- Class: Insecta
- Order: Lepidoptera
- Family: Hesperiidae
- Genus: Dalla
- Species: D. octomaculata

Binomial name
- Dalla octomaculata (Godman, 1900)

Synonyms
- Butleria octomaculata Godman, [1900]

Species of butterfly

Dalla octomaculata, the eight-spotted skipper or light-spotted skipper, is a species of butterfly in the family Hesperiidae, in the subfamily Heteropterinae, which are sometimes called skipperlings. It is found in Costa Rica and Panama.
