= Piruna =

Scientific classification
- Kingdom: Animalia
- Phylum: Arthropoda
- Class: Insecta
- Order: Lepidoptera
- Family: Hesperiidae
- Subfamily: Heteropterinae
- Genus: Piruna; Evans, 1955

Genus of butterflies

Piruna is a genus of skippers in the family Hesperiidae.

== Species ==
- Piruna aea (Dyar, 1912)
- Piruna ajijiciensis Freeman, 1970
- Piruna brunnea (Scudder, 1872)
- Piruna ceracates (Hewitson, 1874)
- Piruna cyclosticta (Dyar, 1920)
- Piruna dampfi (Bell, 1942)
- Piruna gyrans (Plötz, 1884)
- Piruna haferniki Freeman, 1970
- Piruna jonka Steinhauser, 1991
- Piruna kemneri Freeman, 1990
- Piruna maculata Freeman, 1970
- Piruna microsticta (Godman, [1900])
- Piruna millerorum Steinhauser, 1991
- Piruna mullinsi Freeman, 1991
- Piruna penaea (Dyar, 1918)
- Piruna pirus (Edwards, 1878)
- Piruna polingii (Barnes, 1900)
- Piruna purepecha Warren & González, 1999
- Piruna roeveri (Miller & Miller, 1972)
- Piruna sina Freeman, 1970
