= Rubial =

Rubial may refer to:

== People ==
Matronymic surname

- Eider Gardiazábal Rubial (born 1975), Spanish politician

Patronymic surname

- Lentxu Rubial (1945–2013), Spanish politician
- Ramón Rubial (1906–1999), Spanish political activist

== Other uses ==
- Estadio El Rubial (Spanish: The Rubia Stadium), Aguilas, Murcia, Spain
