= Dardarina =

Scientific classification
- Kingdom: Animalia
- Phylum: Arthropoda
- Class: Insecta
- Order: Lepidoptera
- Family: Hesperiidae
- Subfamily: Heteropterinae
- Genus: Dardarina; Evans, 1937

Genus of butterflies

Dardarina is a genus of skippers in the family Hesperiidae. Species of the genus are found in Central America and parts of South America.

== Species ==
Recognised species in the genus Dardarina include:

- Dardarina dardaris (Hewitson, 1877) - Mexico
- Dardarina daridaeus (Godman, 1900) - Brazil
