= Arhopala arta =

Scientific classification
- Kingdom: Animalia
- Phylum: Arthropoda
- Class: Insecta
- Order: Lepidoptera
- Family: Lycaenidae
- Genus: Arhopala
- Species: A. arta

Binomial name
- Arhopala arta Evans, 1957

Species of butterfly

Arhopala arta is a butterfly in the family Lycaenidae. It was discovered by William Harry Evans in 1957. It is found in Papua New Guinea. This species is monotypic.

== Description ==
It is similar to Arhopala thamyras, but it is darker and has a broader border of 3.5 millimeters. Underside is also similar to thamyras.
