= Argopteron =

Scientific classification
- Kingdom: Animalia
- Phylum: Arthropoda
- Class: Insecta
- Order: Lepidoptera
- Family: Hesperiidae
- Subfamily: Heteropterinae
- Genus: Argopteron; Watson, 1893

Genus of butterflies

Argopteron is a genus of skippers in the family Hesperiidae.

== Species ==
Recognised species in the genus Argopteron include:

- Argopteron aureipennis (Blanchard, 1852)
- Argopteron aureuma Peña, 1968
- Argopteron puelmae (Calvert, 1888)

=== Former species ===
- Argopteron xicca Dyar, 1913 - transferred to Ladda xicca (Dyar, 1913)
