= Dalla mentor =

Scientific classification
- Kingdom: Animalia
- Phylum: Arthropoda
- Class: Insecta
- Order: Lepidoptera
- Family: Hesperiidae
- Genus: Dalla
- Species: D. mentor

Binomial name
- Dalla mentor Evans, 1955

Species of butterfly

Dalla mentor is a species of butterfly in the family Hesperiidae. It is found in Mexico.
