= Dalla frontinia =

Scientific classification
- Kingdom: Animalia
- Phylum: Arthropoda
- Class: Insecta
- Order: Lepidoptera
- Family: Hesperiidae
- Genus: Dalla
- Species: D. frontinia

Binomial name
- Dalla frontinia Evans, 1955

Species of butterfly

Dalla frontinia is a species of butterfly in the family Hesperiidae. It is found in Colombia, Peru and Venezuela.

== Subspecies ==
- Dalla frontinia frontinia (Colombia)
- Dalla frontinia vanca Evans, 1955 (Peru)
- Dalla frontinia venda Evans, 1955 (Venezuela)
