= Virius =

Virius may refer to:

== People ==
- Lucius Virius Lupus Iulianus
- Mirko Virius
- Virius Gallus
- Virius Lupus
- Virius Lupus (consul 278)
- Virius Nepotianus
- Virius Nicomachus Flavianus
- Virius Orfitus

== Other uses ==
- Misspelling of virus
- Dalla mesoxantha, also known as Butleria virius.
