= Polycrates (disambiguation) =

Polycrates (Ancient Greek: Πολυκράτης, Polykratēs) may refer to:

== Persons ==
- Polycrates, tyrant of Samos from c. 538 BC to 522 BC
- Polycrates (sophist) (c. 440-370 BC), author of paradoxical encomia and an Accusation of Socrates
- Polycrates of Ephesus (fl. c. AD 130-196), bishop
- Polycrates of Argos, the governor of Cyprus under the Ptolemy V Epiphanes.

== Other ==
- Dalla polycrates, a butterfly in the family Hesperiidae
- Der Ring des Polykrates (poem), a lyrical ballad written in 1797
