= Thomas Schippers =

American conductor (1930 - 1977)

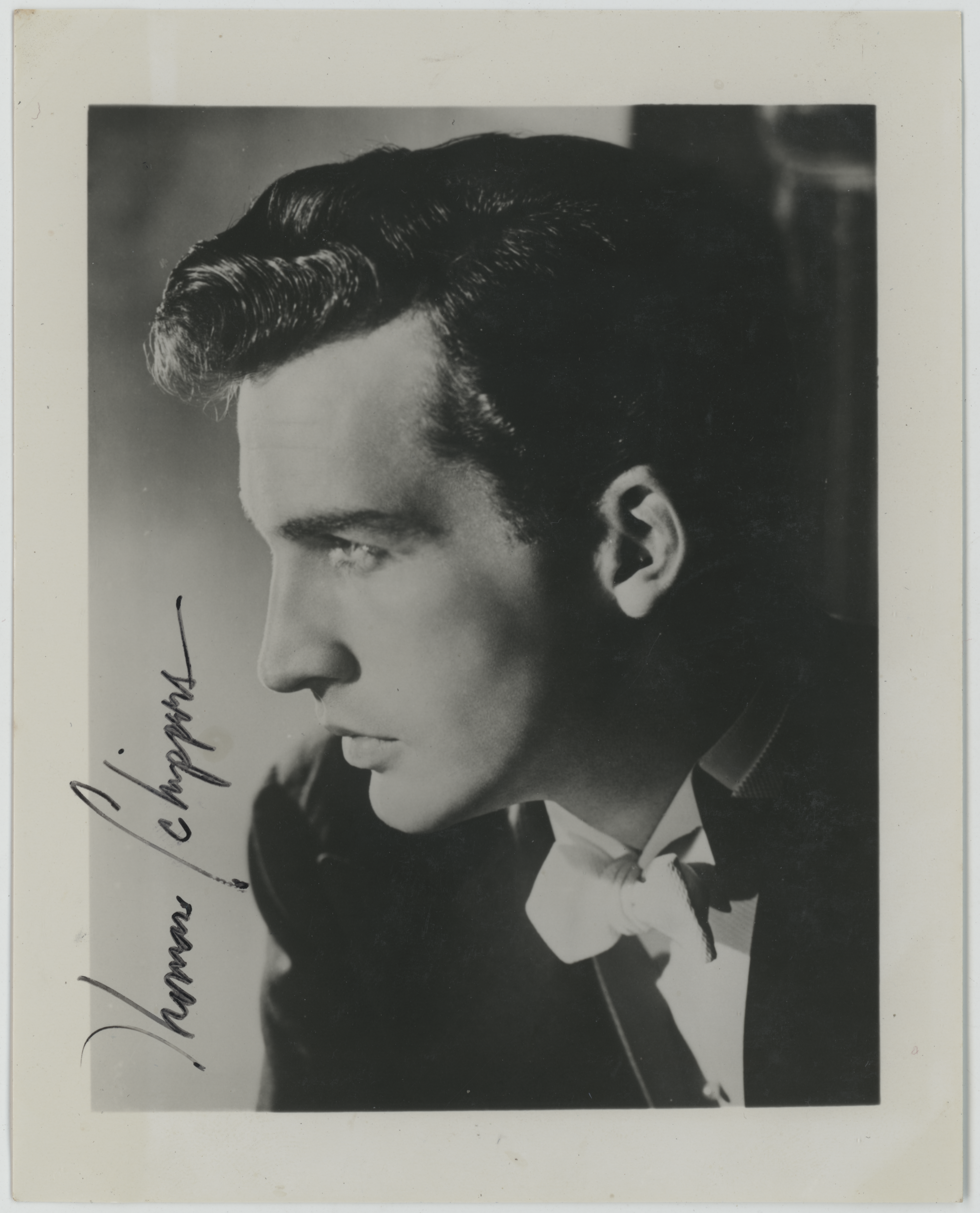
Thomas Schippers (autographed photo)

Thomas Schippers (9 March 1930 – 16 December 1977) was an American conductor. He was highly regarded for his work in opera.

== Biography ==
Of Dutch ancestry and son of the owner of a large appliance store, Schippers was born in Portage, Michigan. He began playing piano at age four. After graduating from high school at age 13, he attended the Curtis Institute and the Juilliard School.

Schippers made his debut at the New York City Opera at age twenty-one, and the Metropolitan Opera at twenty-five. He conducted world premieres of now well-known music by Gian Carlo Menotti and Samuel Barber. He conducted child actor Chet Allen in a theatrical version of Menotti's Amahl and the Night Visitors. Schippers conducted in all the major opera houses of the United States and Europe, most notably the Metropolitan Opera and La Scala, and founded Italy's Spoleto Festival dei Due Mondi with Menotti and once described his perfect orchestra as being composed of "one-third Italian musicians for their line, one-third Jewish for their sound, a sprinkling of Germans for solidity".

Schippers was a regular conductor with the New York Philharmonic and the Chicago Symphony Orchestra, and made recordings with them as well, but in 1970 he finally took a full-time orchestral position with the Cincinnati Symphony Orchestra, succeeding his predecessor at the Metropolitan Opera, Max Rudolf. After making several recordings with them and building the orchestra's international reputation, his career was cut short by his death from lung cancer at age 47 in 1977.

During the 1970s, he was appointed principal conductor of l'Orchestra dell'Accademia Nazionale di Santa Cecilia but conducted only one concert with the orchestra (in May 1976, including Ravel's Ma Mère l'Oye suite). Schippers made several opera recordings and recordings of his live performances are gradually being made available. His 1971 studio recording of Lucia di Lammermoor by Gaetano Donizetti with Beverly Sills and Carlo Bergonzi was the first recording in which the glass harmonica was used in the mad scene. In 1974, he recorded The Siege of Corinth, with Sills, Shirley Verrett, Justino Díaz, and Harry Theyard for EMI. His 1964 Decca recording of Verdi's Macbeth with the Santa Cecilia Orchestra was noted for his dramatic approach.

He was a National Patron of Delta Omicron, an international professional music fraternity.

== Personal life ==
Though reputed to be homosexual, Schippers married Elaine Lane "Nonie" Phipps (1939–1973) in 1965. An heiress to the Grace shipping fortune and a daughter of the noted American polo player Michael Grace Phipps, she died of ovarian cancer in 1973. Schippers died of lung cancer in 1977.

According to professor, writer and opera scholar John Louis DiGaetani, Schippers had a long-term romantic relationship with Menotti and a shorter one with mathematician Sean Clarke. One of Leonard Bernstein's biographers claims that Schippers and Bernstein were also intimately involved.
