= Dalla bubobon =

Scientific classification
- Kingdom: Animalia
- Phylum: Arthropoda
- Class: Insecta
- Order: Lepidoptera
- Family: Hesperiidae
- Genus: Dalla
- Species: D. bubobon

Binomial name
- Dalla bubobon (Dyar, 1921)

Synonyms
- Butleria bubobon Dyar, 1921

Species of butterfly

Dalla bubobon is a species of butterfly in the family Hesperiidae. It is found in Guerrero, Mexico.

== Description ==
Dorsally, the palpi are mostly black, with a few orange scales. Ventrally, they are yellowish white, with a few black scales. The base of the palpi are surrounded with a row of long black scales that extend almost to the distal tip of each palpus. The antennae are strongly checkered orange and black, with the club being mostly black dorsally, mostly orange ventrally.
