= Argopteron puelmae =

Scientific classification
- Kingdom: Animalia
- Phylum: Arthropoda
- Class: Insecta
- Order: Lepidoptera
- Family: Hesperiidae
- Genus: Argopteron
- Species: A. puelmae

Binomial name
- Argopteron puelmae (Calvert, 1888)

Synonyms
- Cyclopides puelmae Calvert, 1888

Species of butterfly

Argopteron puelmae is a butterfly of the family Hesperiidae. It was described by Calvert in 1888. It is found in Chile.
