= Dalla gelus =

Scientific classification
- Kingdom: Animalia
- Phylum: Arthropoda
- Class: Insecta
- Order: Lepidoptera
- Family: Hesperiidae
- Genus: Dalla
- Species: D. gelus

Binomial name
- Dalla gelus (Mabille, 1898)

Synonyms
- Butleria gelus Mabille, 1898; Dalla vicina Mabille, 1898 (nom. nud.)

Species of butterfly

Dalla gelus is a species of butterfly in the family Hesperiidae. It is found in Bolivia and Ecuador.
