= Ladda pantha =

Scientific classification
- Kingdom: Animalia
- Phylum: Arthropoda
- Class: Insecta
- Order: Lepidoptera
- Family: Hesperiidae
- Genus: Ladda
- Species: L. pantha

Binomial name
- Ladda pantha (Evans, 1955)

Synonyms
- Dalla pantha Evans, 1955

Species of butterfly

Ladda pantha is a species of butterfly in the family Hesperiidae. It is found in Peru.
