= Dalla freemani =

Scientific classification
- Kingdom: Animalia
- Phylum: Arthropoda
- Class: Insecta
- Order: Lepidoptera
- Family: Hesperiidae
- Genus: Dalla
- Species: D. freemani

Binomial name
- Dalla freemani Warren, 1997

Species of butterfly

Dalla freemani is a species of butterfly in the family Hesperiidae. It is found in Guatemala.
