= Dalla epiphaneus =

Scientific classification
- Kingdom: Animalia
- Phylum: Arthropoda
- Class: Insecta
- Order: Lepidoptera
- Family: Hesperiidae
- Genus: Dalla
- Species: D. epiphaneus

Binomial name
- Dalla epiphaneus (C. & R. Felder, [1867])

Synonyms
- Carterocephalus epiphaneus C. & R. Felder, [1867]; Butleria gaujoni Mabille, 1898

Species of butterfly

Dalla epiphaneus is a species of butterfly in the family Hesperiidae. It is found in Ecuador, Colombia, Peru and Bolivia.

== Subspecies ==
- Dalla epiphaneus epiphaneus - Colombia
- Dalla epiphaneus anca Evans, 1955 - Peru
- Dalla epiphaneus gaujoni (Mabille, 1898) - Ecuador
- Dalla epiphaneus junga Evans, 1955 - Bolivia
- Dalla epiphaneus limba Evans, 1955 - Peru
- Dalla epiphaneus poya Evans, 1955 - Peru
