= Dalla ligilla =

Scientific classification
- Kingdom: Animalia
- Phylum: Arthropoda
- Class: Insecta
- Order: Lepidoptera
- Family: Hesperiidae
- Genus: Dalla
- Species: D. ligilla

Binomial name
- Dalla ligilla (Hewitson, 1877)

Synonyms
- Cyclopides ligilla Hewitson, 1877; Butleria ligilla Plötz, 1884

Species of butterfly

Dalla ligilla is a species of butterfly in the family Hesperiidae. It is found in Mexico.
