= Dalla orsines =

Scientific classification
- Kingdom: Animalia
- Phylum: Arthropoda
- Class: Insecta
- Order: Lepidoptera
- Family: Hesperiidae
- Genus: Dalla
- Species: D. orsines

Binomial name
- Dalla orsines (Hewitson, 1877)

Synonyms
- Cyclopides orsines Hewitson, 1877; Dalla albescens Draudt, 1923

Species of butterfly

Dalla orsines is a species of butterfly in the family Hesperiidae. It is found in Bolivia.
