= Dalla riza =

Scientific classification
- Kingdom: Animalia
- Phylum: Arthropoda
- Class: Insecta
- Order: Lepidoptera
- Family: Hesperiidae
- Genus: Dalla
- Species: D. riza

Binomial name
- Dalla riza (Mabille, 1889)

Synonyms
- Butleria riza Mabille, 1889; Butleria riza Mabille, 1891 (preocc. Mabille, 1889); Butleria quadripuncta Lindsey, 1925

Species of butterfly

Dalla riza is a species of butterfly in the family Hesperiidae. It is found in Colombia and Peru.
