= Piruna haferniki =

Scientific classification
- Kingdom: Animalia
- Phylum: Arthropoda
- Class: Insecta
- Order: Lepidoptera
- Family: Hesperiidae
- Genus: Piruna
- Species: P. haferniki

Binomial name
- Piruna haferniki H. Freeman, 1970

Species of butterfly

Piruna haferniki, the chisos skipperling, is a species of intermediate skipper in the butterfly family Hesperiidae. It is found in Central America and North America.

The MONA or Hodges number for Piruna haferniki is 3986.
