= Dalla pulchra =

Scientific classification
- Kingdom: Animalia
- Phylum: Arthropoda
- Class: Insecta
- Order: Lepidoptera
- Family: Hesperiidae
- Genus: Dalla
- Species: D. pulchra

Binomial name
- Dalla pulchra (Godman, [1900])

Synonyms
- Butleria pulchra Godman, [1900]

Species of butterfly

Dalla pulchra is a species of butterfly in the family Hesperiidae. It is found in Costa Rica.
