= Dalla genes =

Scientific classification
- Kingdom: Animalia
- Phylum: Arthropoda
- Class: Insecta
- Order: Lepidoptera
- Family: Hesperiidae
- Genus: Dalla
- Species: D. genes

Binomial name
- Dalla genes (Mabille, 1898)

Synonyms
- Butleria genes Mabille, 1898; Butleria genes saleca Mabille, 1898

Species of butterfly

Dalla genes is a species of butterfly in the family Hesperiidae. It is found in Bolivia, Peru, Colombia and Ecuador.

== Subspecies ==
- Dalla genes genes - Ecuador
- Dalla genes golia Evans, 1955 - Peru
- Dalla genes nona Evans, 1955 - Bolivia
- Dalla genes saleca (Mabille, 1898) - Colombia
