= Dalla cypselus =

Scientific classification
- Kingdom: Animalia
- Phylum: Arthropoda
- Class: Insecta
- Order: Lepidoptera
- Family: Hesperiidae
- Genus: Dalla
- Species: D. cypselus

Binomial name
- Dalla cypselus (C. & R. Felder, 1867)

Synonyms
- Carterocephalus cypselus C. & R. Felder, 1867; Cyclopides cypselus evages Hewitson, 1877

Species of butterfly

Dalla cypselus is a species of butterfly in the family Hesperiidae. It is found in Colombia and Bolivia.

== Subspecies ==
- Dalla cypselus cypselus - Colombia
- Dalla cypselus evages (Hewitson, 1877) - Bolivia
