= Ladda tona =

Scientific classification
- Kingdom: Animalia
- Phylum: Arthropoda
- Class: Insecta
- Order: Lepidoptera
- Family: Hesperiidae
- Genus: Ladda
- Species: L. tona

Binomial name
- Ladda tona (Evans, 1955)

Synonyms
- Dalla tona Evans, 1955

Species of butterfly

Ladda tona is a species of butterfly in the family Hesperiidae. It is found in Peru and Brazil.
