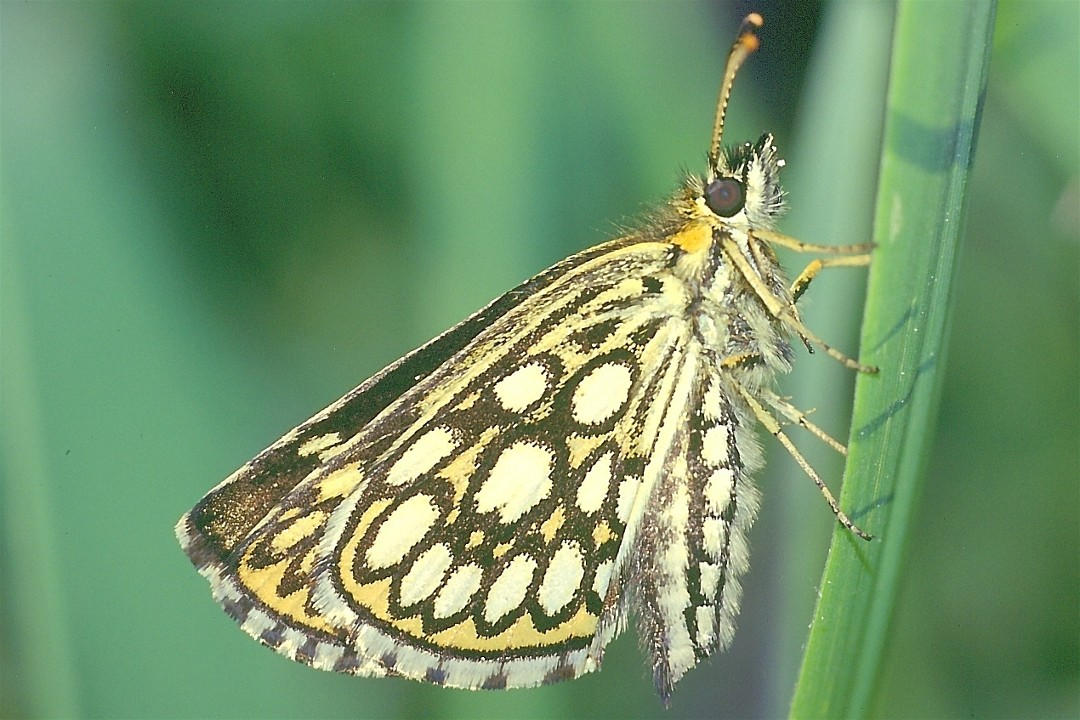

Scientific classification
- Kingdom: Animalia
- Phylum: Arthropoda
- Class: Insecta
- Order: Lepidoptera
- Family: Hesperiidae
- Subfamily: Heteropterinae
- Genus: Heteropterus; Duméril, 1806
- Species: H. morpheus

Binomial name
- Heteropterus morpheus (Pallas, 1771)

Synonyms
- Papilio morpheus Pallas, 1771; Papilio steropes Denis & Schiffermüller, 1775; Papilio speculum Rottemburg, 1775; Papilio aracinthus Fabricius, 1777

= Large chequered skipper =

Species of butterfly

The large chequered skipper (Heteropterus morpheus) is a species of butterfly in the family Hesperiidae. It is the single member of the monotypic genus Heteropterus. The species can be found in isolated populations in Europe and east across the Palearctic to Central Asia and Korea. It is endangered in the Netherlands.

== Taxonomy ==
Formerly, the genus Heteropterus also included the following species:

- Heteropterus formosus Butler, 1894 - transferred to Willema formosus (Butler, 1894)
- Heteropterus willemi Wallengren, 1857 - transferred to Willema willemi (Wallengren, 1857)

== Description ==
The length of the forewings is 15–18 mm. The butterfly has a very distinctive and attractive underside but a drab upperside (which is rarely seen, as it usually settles with wings closed). The upper side is quite dark brown and it is the reverse which is characteristic with brown fore wings in part covered by the hind wing and in the visible part the same ornamentation as the hind wings, on an ochre ground three lines of spots white ovals surrounded by black and a white border cut with black.

== Description in Seitz ==
H. morpheus Pall. (= steropes Schiff.) (87 b). Forewing above black with 3 apical dots and a spot each in cellules 4 and 5. Some females have on the hindwing a row of 4 or 5 yellow dashes and a small dot in the cell. The forewing bears beneath a spot in the cell, another proximally to the apical dots and a narrow short band near the margin. The hindwing has three rows of oval, mother-of-pearl spots which are surrounded by small yellow spots, there being also a narrow yellow band near the margin. The butterfly is called "mirror" on account of the mother-of-pearl spots. Europe, Asia, eastwards to Japan.

== Distribution and habitat ==
In France, it has been seen in the south west including, in 2011, the Hautes-Pyrénées department.

== Behaviour and ecology ==
The butterfly is on the wing from June to August, depending on the location. The flight is just as distinctive as its appearance and indeed provides immediate identification of the species: it appears to bounce through the air with little sense of direction, almost as if drunk.

The larvae feed on Eriophorum, Poa annua, Calamagrostis canescens, Brachypodium and Molinia species (including Molinia coerulea).

== Gallery ==
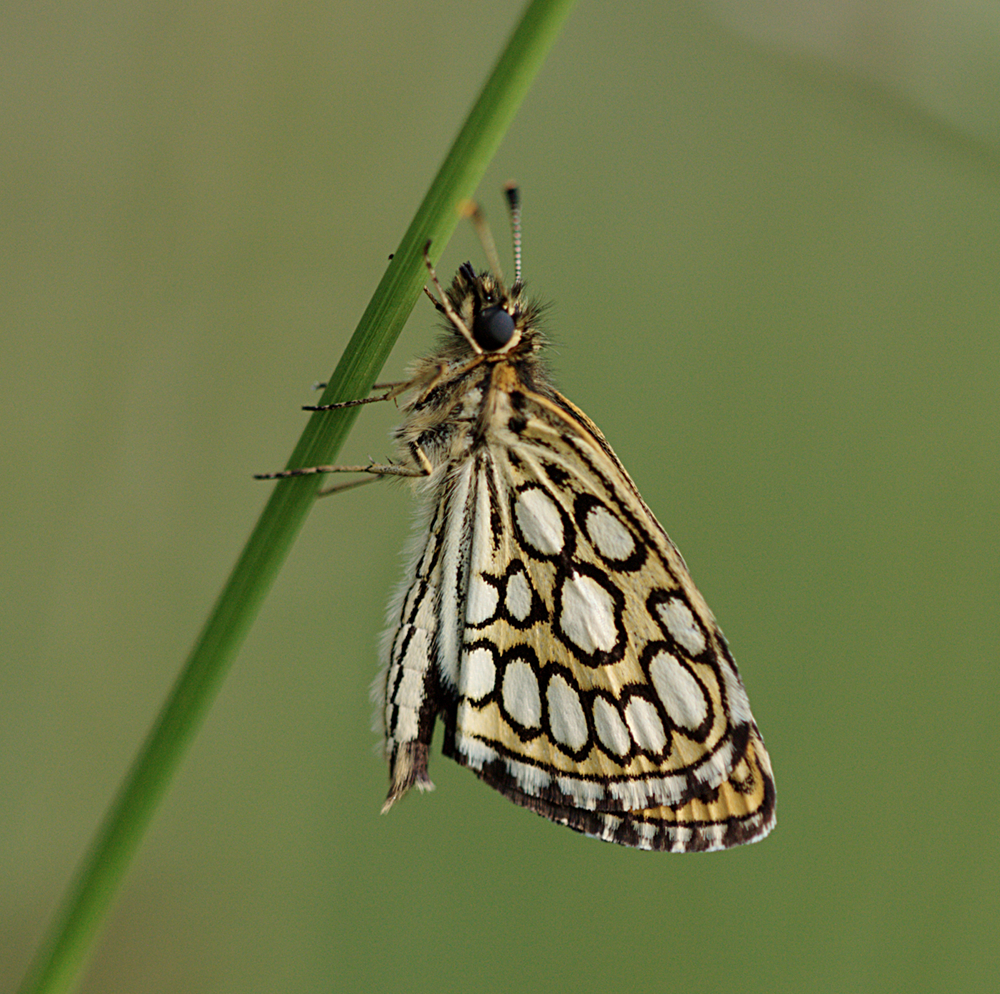
Specimen in southern France

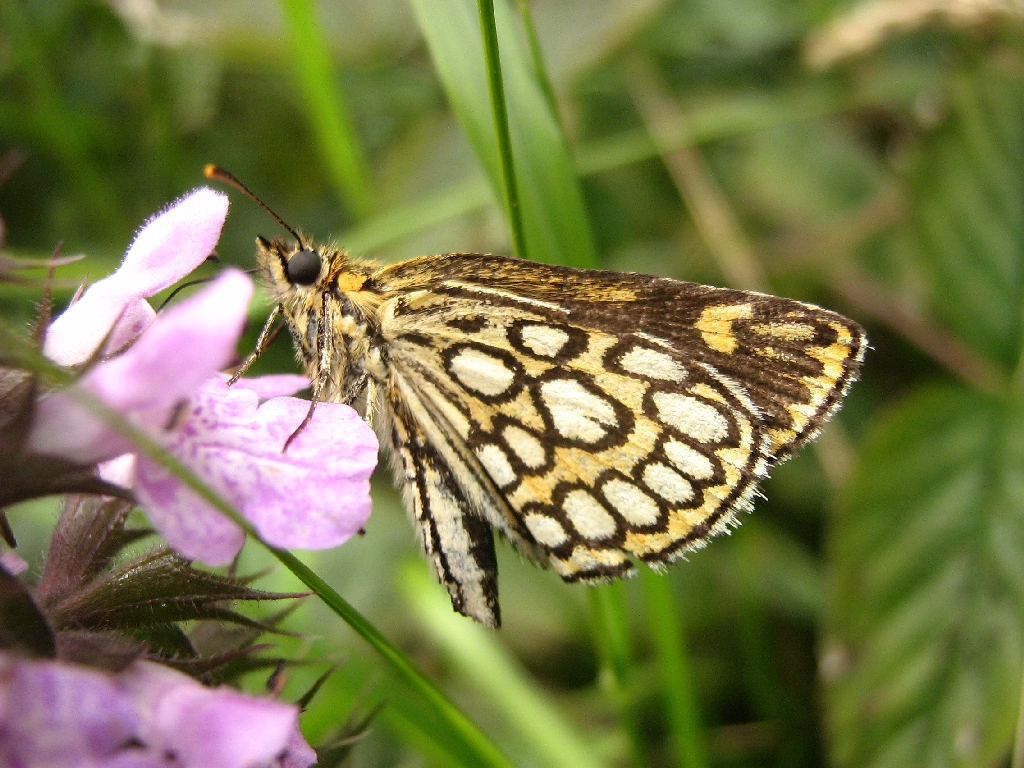

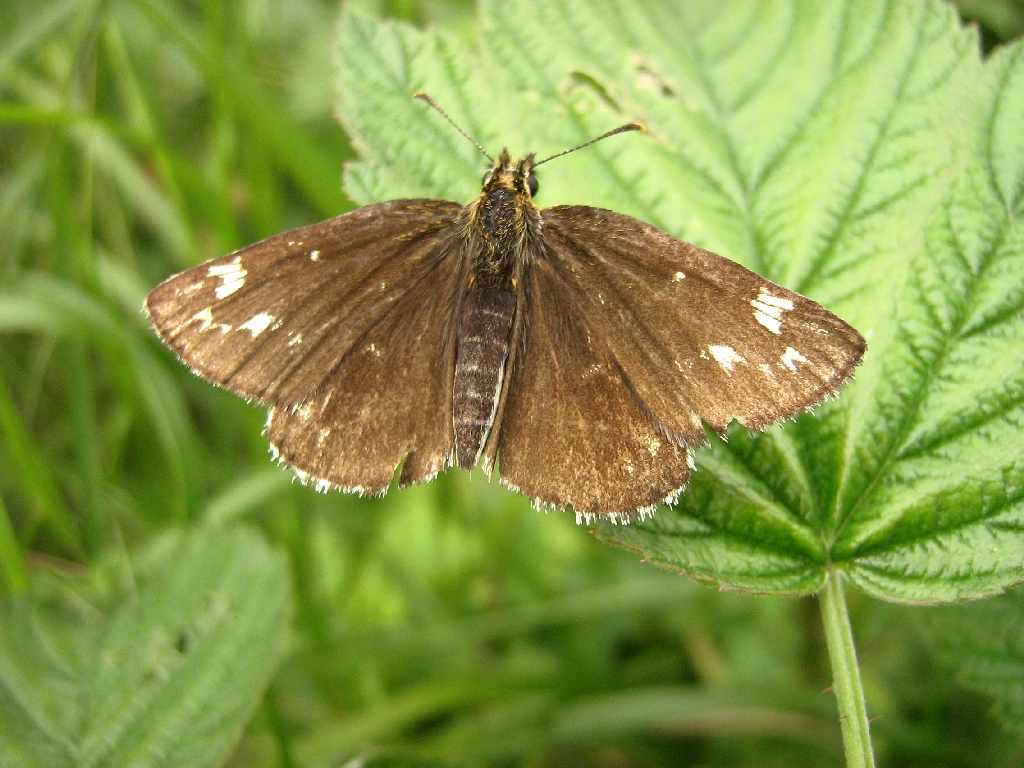
