= Piruna polingii =

Scientific classification
- Kingdom: Animalia
- Phylum: Arthropoda
- Class: Insecta
- Order: Lepidoptera
- Family: Hesperiidae
- Genus: Piruna
- Species: P. polingii

Binomial name
- Piruna polingii (Barnes, 1900)

Species of butterfly

Piruna polingii, the four-spotted skipperling, is a species of intermediate skipper in the family of butterflies known as Hesperiidae. It was first described by William Barnes in 1900 and it is found in Central and North America.

The MONA or Hodges number for Piruna polingii is 3984.
