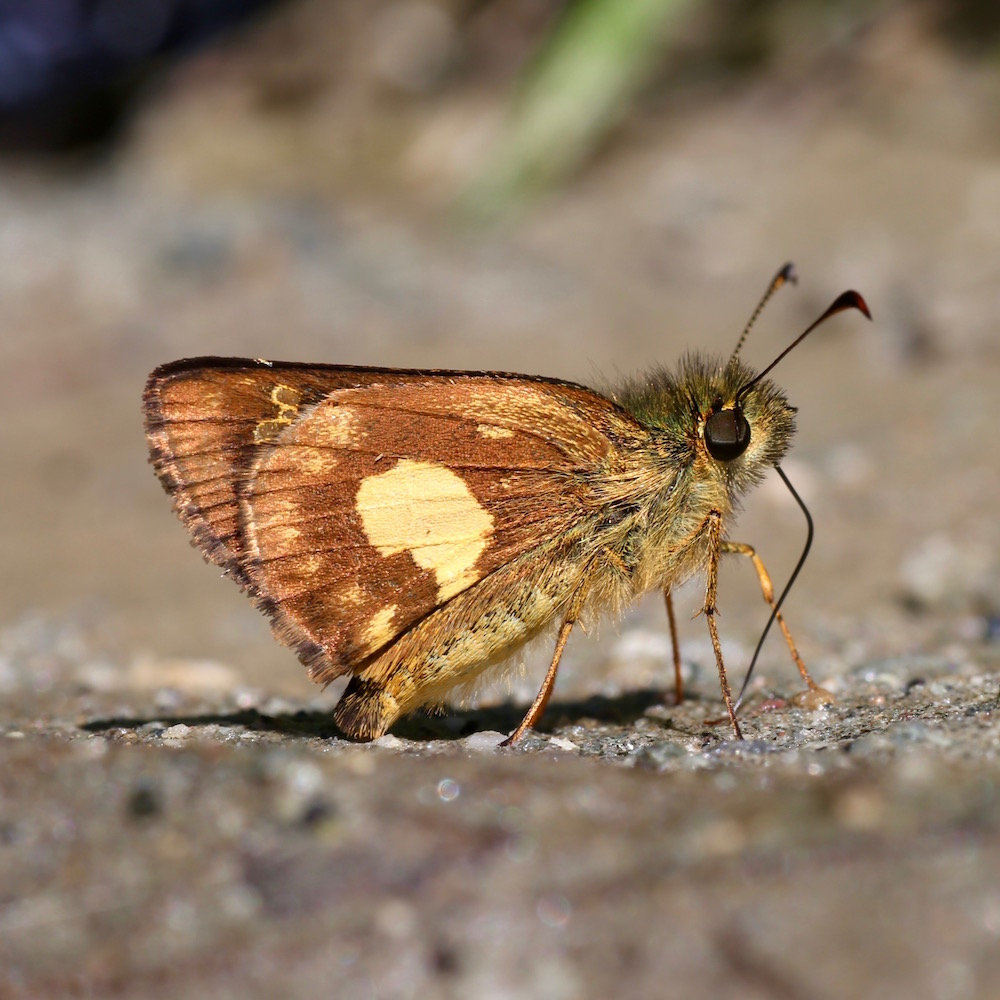

Scientific classification
- Kingdom: Animalia
- Phylum: Arthropoda
- Class: Insecta
- Order: Lepidoptera
- Family: Hesperiidae
- Genus: Dalla
- Species: D. frater

Binomial name
- Dalla frater (Mabille, 1878)

Synonyms
- Cyclopides frater Mabille, 1878

= Dalla frater =

Species of butterfly

Dalla frater, the frater skippering, is a species of butterfly in the family Hesperiidae. It is found from Panama to Bolivia. Wingspan: 25–28 mm.
