= Dalla calaon =

Scientific classification
- Kingdom: Animalia
- Phylum: Arthropoda
- Class: Insecta
- Order: Lepidoptera
- Family: Hesperiidae
- Genus: Dalla
- Species: D. calaon

Binomial name
- Dalla calaon (Hewitson, 1877)

Synonyms
- Cyclopides calaon Hewitson, 1877

Species of butterfly

Dalla calaon, the calaon skipperling, is a species of butterfly in the family Hesperiidae. It was first described (Note: as Cyclopides calaon) in 1877 by William Chapman Hewitson, and is found in Ecuador.
