= Petri Sarvamaa =

Finnish politician and journalist (born 1960)

Petri Sarvamaa MEP
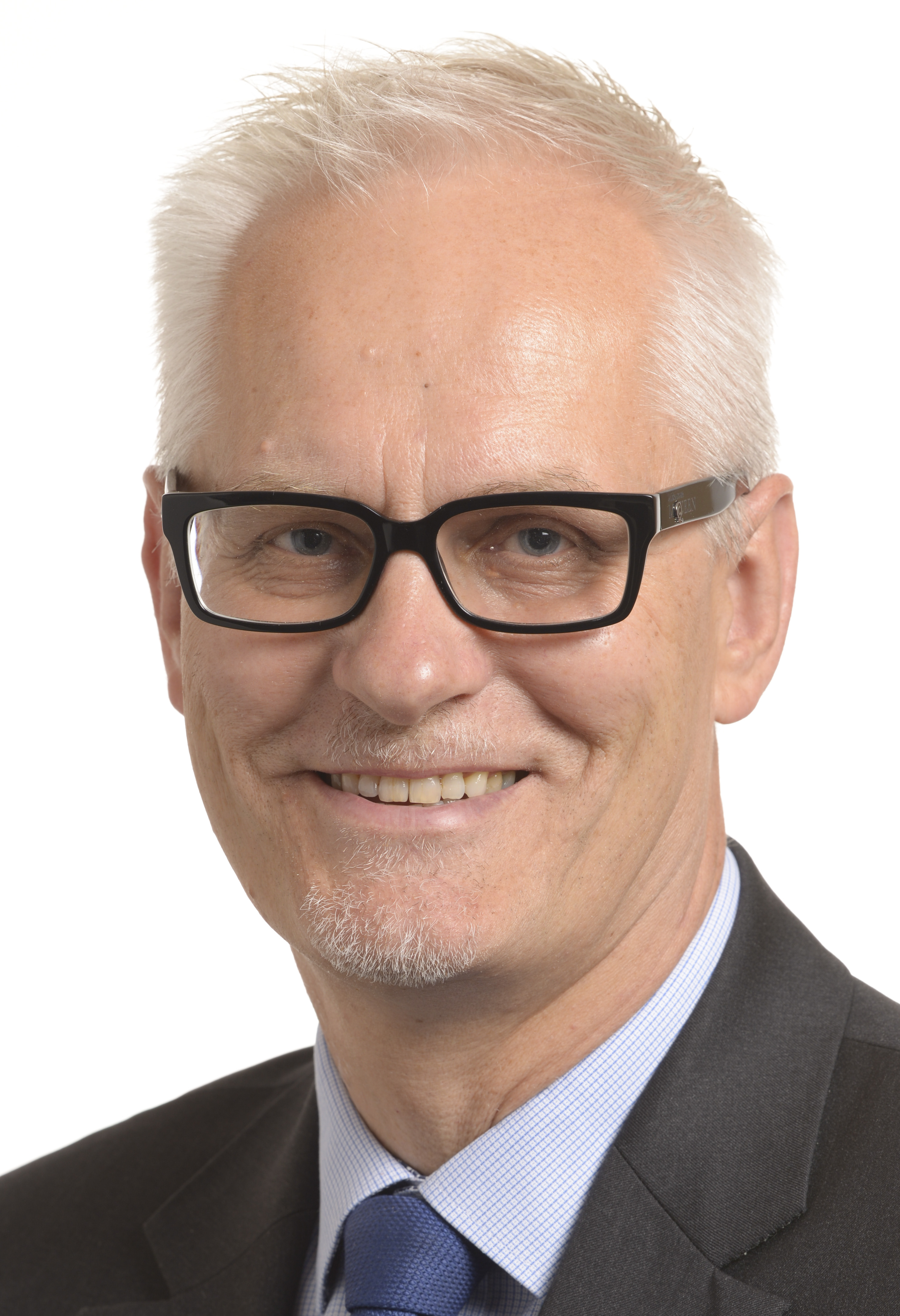

Member of the European Parliament
- In office 2012–2024

Personal details
- Born: Petri Ilari Sarvamaa; 15 September 1960 (age 66) Joensuu, Finland
- Party: Finnish; National Coalition Party; EU; European People's Party
- Education: University of Helsinki
- Website: www.petrisarvamaa.eu

Petri Ilari Sarvamaa (born 15 September 1960) is a Finnish politician who served as Member of the European Parliament (MEP) from 2012 to 2024. He is a member of the National Coalition Party, part of the European People's Party. Before becoming an MEP, he had a long career as a journalist at Finland's national broadcasting company Yle.

== Political career ==
Since becoming a Member of the European Parliament in 2012, Sarvamaa served on the Committee on Budgetary Control. In this capacity, he was the rapporteur in charge of several reports on the budgets of agencies of the European Union. In 2019, he drafted (together with Eider Gardiazabal) legislation on cutting EU funds to member states that undermine the rule of law.

Sarvamaa also served on the Committee on Transport and Tourism (2012-2014), the Committee on Budgets (2014-2019), and the Committee on Agriculture and Rural Development (2019–2024).

In addition to his committee assignments, Sarvamaa is a supporter of the MEP Alliance for Mental Health; the European Parliament Intergroup on Climate Change, Biodiversity and Sustainable Development; the European Parliament Intergroup on LGBT Rights; the European Parliament Intergroup on Disability; and of the European Parliament Intergroup on Anti-Corruption.

In September 2022, Sarvamaa was the recipient of the Agriculture, Fisheries and Rural Development Award at The Parliament Magazine's annual MEP Awards

In September 2023, the Finnish government nominated Sarvamaa as Finland's candidate for the European Court of Auditors. He began his term in June 2024.

== Recognition ==
Sarvamaa was ranked as one of the 15 most influential MEPs in the 2014-19 legislature by VoteWatch, as measured by the positions held, the number of reports and opinions and the votes won, weighed by perceived importance and normalized by average influence of their country.

== Personal life ==
Sarvamaa's father's, Boris Sarvamaa's (né Saharov), family emigrated to Finland from St. Petersburg during the Russian Revolution. Sarvamaa is an Orthodox Christian. He divorced in 2021.
