= Dalla cola =

Scientific classification
- Kingdom: Animalia
- Phylum: Arthropoda
- Clade: Pancrustacea
- Class: Insecta
- Order: Lepidoptera
- Family: Hesperiidae
- Genus: Dalla
- Species: D. cola

Binomial name
- Dalla cola Bell, 1959

Species of butterfly

Dalla cola is a species of butterfly in the family Hesperiidae. It is found in Colombia.
