= Dalla faula =

Scientific classification
- Kingdom: Animalia
- Phylum: Arthropoda
- Class: Insecta
- Order: Lepidoptera
- Family: Hesperiidae
- Genus: Dalla
- Species: D. faula

Binomial name
- Dalla faula (Godman, [1900])

Synonyms
- Butleria faula Godman, [1900]; Butleria lysis Schaus, 1913

Species of butterfly

Dalla faula is a species of butterfly in the family Hesperiidae. It is found in Mexico and Costa Rica.

== Subspecies ==
- Dalla faula faula - Mexico
- Dalla faula lysis Schaus, 1913 - Costa Rica
