= Deca =

Deca, Decas or DECA may refer to:

- Deca-, a metric prefix
- Nandrolone, the active ingredient in the steroid Deca-Durabolin, commonly referred to as Deca
- Decabromodiphenyl ether, an organic compound
- Deca-press, Moldavian news agency
- Deca (journalism collective), a journalism cooperative
- Deca i Sunce (Children and the Sun), album by the Serbian hip-hop artist Marčelo
- Deca Sports, sports video game series for the Wii
- Decas (album), compilation album by the American metal band As I Lay Dying
- Deca Games, video game company

== People ==
=== Deca ===
- Ligia Deca (born 1982), Romanian politician, Minister of Education since 2022
- Deca (rapper), American hip-hop artist

=== Decas ===
- Charles Decas (born 1937), American politician
- Wesly Decas (born 1999), Honduran footballer

== Acronyms ==
- DECA (organization), a business-marketing student organization, formerly Distributive Education Clubs of America
- Defense Commissary Agency, United States Department of Defense
- Defence Electronics and Components Agency, United Kingdom Ministry of Defence
- DECA, an abbreviation for the Decathlon or Super Decathlon light aircraft by Champion Aircraft Corporation

== See also ==
- Deka (disambiguation)
- Decca (disambiguation)
- Dalton (disambiguation)
