= Ladda mars =

Scientific classification
- Kingdom: Animalia
- Phylum: Arthropoda
- Class: Insecta
- Order: Lepidoptera
- Family: Hesperiidae
- Genus: Ladda
- Species: L. mars

Binomial name
- Ladda mars Evans, 1955

Synonyms
- Dalla mars Evans, 1955

Species of butterfly

Ladda mars is a species of butterfly in the family Hesperiidae, described by William Harry Evans in 1955 from Colombia.
