= Ladda mora =

Scientific classification
- Kingdom: Animalia
- Phylum: Arthropoda
- Class: Insecta
- Order: Lepidoptera
- Family: Hesperiidae
- Genus: Ladda
- Species: L. mora

Binomial name
- Ladda mora (Evans, 1955)

Synonyms
- Dalla mora Evans, 1955

Species of butterfly

Ladda mora is a species of butterfly in the family Hesperiidae. It is found in Ecuador.
