= Dalla semiargentea =

Scientific classification
- Kingdom: Animalia
- Phylum: Arthropoda
- Class: Insecta
- Order: Lepidoptera
- Family: Hesperiidae
- Genus: Dalla
- Species: D. semiargentea

Binomial name
- Dalla semiargentea (C. & R. Felder, [1867])

Synonyms
- Eumesia semiargentea C. & R. Felder, [1867]

Species of butterfly

Dalla semiargentea is a species of butterfly in the family Hesperiidae. It is found in Colombia.
