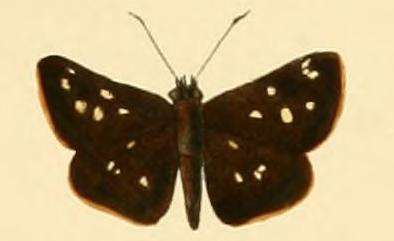

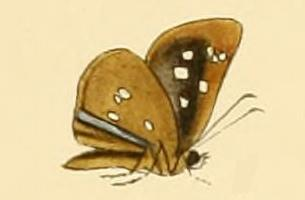

Scientific classification
- Kingdom: Animalia
- Phylum: Arthropoda
- Class: Insecta
- Order: Lepidoptera
- Family: Hesperiidae
- Genus: Piruna
- Species: P. ceracates

Binomial name
- Piruna ceracates (Hewitson, 1874)

Synonyms
- Cyclopides ceracates Hewitson, 1874

= Piruna ceracates =

Species of butterfly

Piruna ceracates is a butterfly in the family Hesperiidae. It is found in Mexico.
