= Dalla dimidiatus =

Scientific classification
- Kingdom: Animalia
- Phylum: Arthropoda
- Class: Insecta
- Order: Lepidoptera
- Family: Hesperiidae
- Genus: Dalla
- Species: D. dimidiatus

Binomial name
- Dalla dimidiatus (C. & R. Felder, 1867)

Synonyms
- Carterocephalus dimidiatus C. & R. Felder, 1867; Butleria xantholeuca Plötz, 1884

Species of butterfly

Dalla dimidiatus is a species of butterfly in the family Hesperiidae. It is found in Colombia, Venezuela and Peru.

== Subspecies ==
- Dalla dimidiatus dimidiatus - Colombia, Venezuela
- Dalla dimidiatus lilla Evans, 1955 - Peru
- Dalla dimidiatus pucer Evans, 1955 - Peru
