= Dalla cupavia =

Scientific classification
- Kingdom: Animalia
- Phylum: Arthropoda
- Class: Insecta
- Order: Lepidoptera
- Family: Hesperiidae
- Genus: Dalla
- Species: D. cupavia

Binomial name
- Dalla cupavia (Mabille, 1898)

Synonyms
- Butleria cupavia Mabille, 1898; Dalla charybdis Draudt, 1923

Species of butterfly

Dalla cupavia is a species of butterfly in the family Hesperiidae. It is found in Bolivia and Peru.

== Subspecies ==
- Dalla cupavia cupavia - Bolivia
- Dalla cupavia elka Evans, 1955 - Peru
