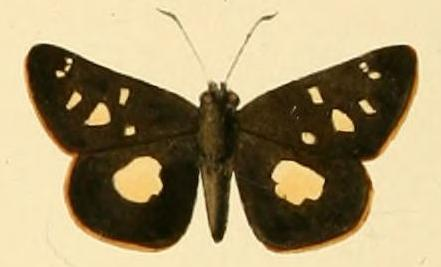

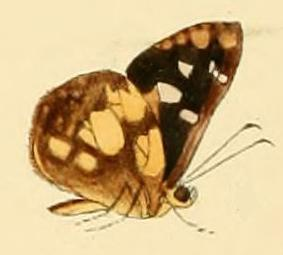

Scientific classification
- Kingdom: Animalia
- Phylum: Arthropoda
- Class: Insecta
- Order: Lepidoptera
- Family: Hesperiidae
- Genus: Dalla
- Species: D. caicus

Binomial name
- Dalla caicus (Hewitson, 1868)

Synonyms
- Cyclopides caicus Hewitson, 1868; Dalla ceicus C. Gibson & Bunt, 1974 (misspelling)

= Dalla caicus =

Species of butterfly

Dalla caicus is a species of butterfly in the family Hesperiidae. It is found in Venezuela and Peru.

== Subspecies ==
- Dalla caicus caicus - Venezuela
- Dalla caicus inca Draudt, 1923 - Peru
