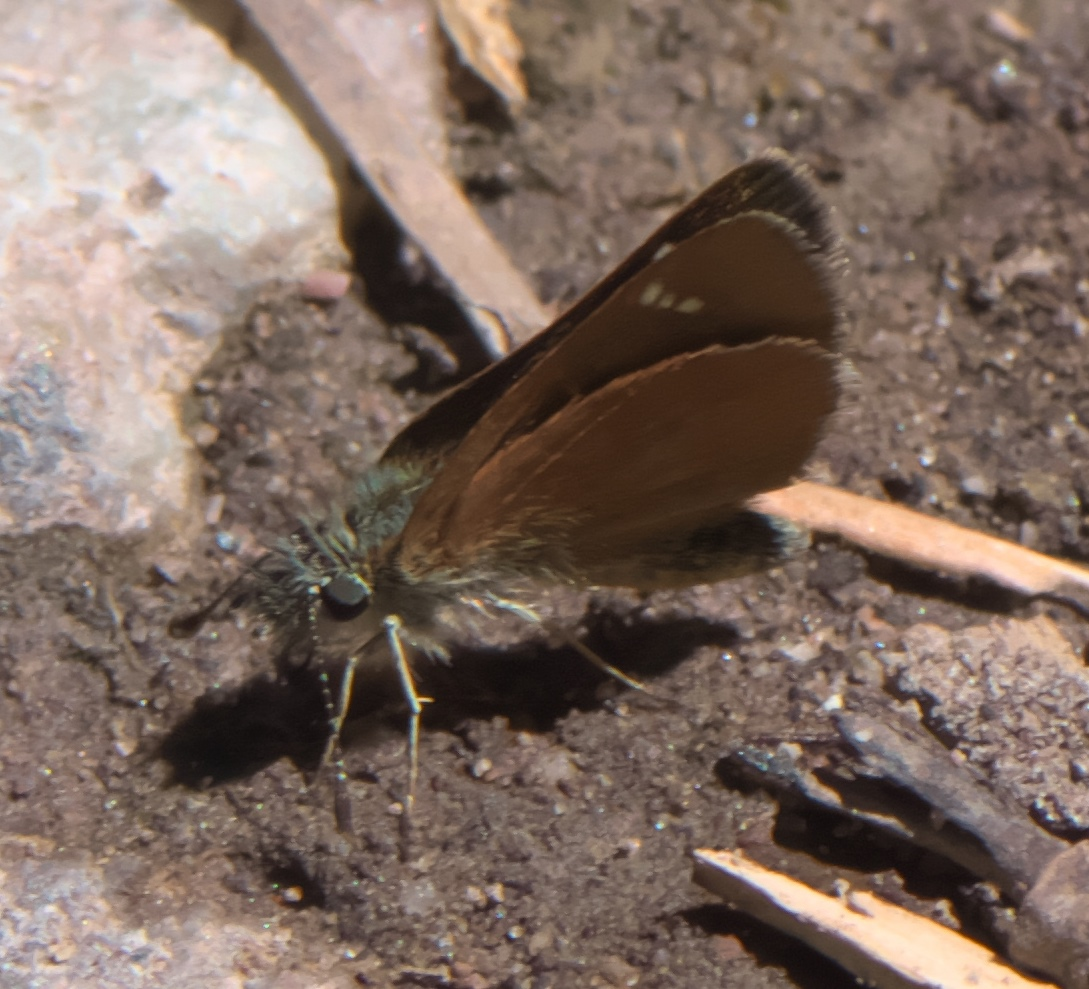

Scientific classification
- Kingdom: Animalia
- Phylum: Arthropoda
- Class: Insecta
- Order: Lepidoptera
- Family: Hesperiidae
- Genus: Piruna
- Species: P. pirus

Binomial name
- Piruna pirus (W. H. Edwards, 1878)

Synonyms
- Pholisora semicaeca Mabille and Boullet, 1917

= Piruna pirus =

Species of butterfly

Piruna pirus, the russet skipperling, is a species of intermediate skipper in the butterfly family Hesperiidae. It is found in North America.

The MONA or Hodges number for Piruna pirus is 3983.
