= Dalla dora =

Scientific classification
- Kingdom: Animalia
- Phylum: Arthropoda
- Class: Insecta
- Order: Lepidoptera
- Family: Hesperiidae
- Genus: Dalla
- Species: D. dora

Binomial name
- Dalla dora Bell, 1947

Species of butterfly

Dalla dora is a species of butterfly in the family Hesperiidae. It is found in Ecuador.
