= Dalla lalage =

Scientific classification
- Kingdom: Animalia
- Phylum: Arthropoda
- Class: Insecta
- Order: Lepidoptera
- Family: Hesperiidae
- Genus: Dalla
- Species: D. lalage

Binomial name
- Dalla lalage (Godman, [1900])

Synonyms
- Butleria lalage Godman, [1900]

Species of butterfly

Dalla lalage is a species of butterfly in the family Hesperiidae. It is found in Mexico.
