= Dalla spica =

Scientific classification
- Kingdom: Animalia
- Phylum: Arthropoda
- Class: Insecta
- Order: Lepidoptera
- Family: Hesperiidae
- Genus: Dalla
- Species: D. spica

Binomial name
- Dalla spica Hayward, 1939

Species of butterfly

Dalla spica is a species of butterfly in the family Hesperiidae. It is found in Argentina and Bolivia.

== Subspecies ==
- Dalla spica spica - Argentina
- Dalla spica livia Evans, 1955 - Bolivia
