= Dalla cyprius =

Scientific classification
- Kingdom: Animalia
- Phylum: Arthropoda
- Class: Insecta
- Order: Lepidoptera
- Family: Hesperiidae
- Genus: Dalla
- Species: D. cyprius

Binomial name
- Dalla cyprius (Mabille, 1898)

Synonyms
- Butleria cyprius Mabille, 1898

Species of butterfly

Dalla cyprius is a species of butterfly in the family Hesperiidae. It is found in Bolivia and Peru.

== Subspecies ==
- Dalla cyprius cyprius - Bolivia
- Dalla cyprius quinka Evans, 1955 - Peru
