= Dalla diraspes =

Scientific classification
- Kingdom: Animalia
- Phylum: Arthropoda
- Class: Insecta
- Order: Lepidoptera
- Family: Hesperiidae
- Genus: Dalla
- Species: D. diraspes

Binomial name
- Dalla diraspes (Hewitson, 1877)

Synonyms
- Cyclopides diraspes Hewitson, 1877; Butleria pruna Plötz, 1884; Butleria duovata Weeks, 1901; Butleria arpia Schaus, 1902

Species of butterfly

Dalla diraspes is a species of butterfly in the family Hesperiidae. It is found in Brazil (Rio de Janeiro, Minas Gerais) and Bolivia.
