= Dalla costala =

Scientific classification
- Kingdom: Animalia
- Phylum: Arthropoda
- Class: Insecta
- Order: Lepidoptera
- Family: Hesperiidae
- Genus: Dalla
- Species: D. costala

Binomial name
- Dalla costala Evans, 1955

Species of butterfly

Dalla costala is a species of butterfly in the family Hesperiidae. It is found in Bolivia and Peru.

== Subspecies ==
- Dalla costala costala - Bolivia
- Dalla costala ascha Evans, 1955 - Peru
- Dalla costala zona Evans, 1955 - Peru
