= Dalla scylla =

Scientific classification
- Kingdom: Animalia
- Phylum: Arthropoda
- Class: Insecta
- Order: Lepidoptera
- Family: Hesperiidae
- Genus: Dalla
- Species: D. scylla

Binomial name
- Dalla scylla (Mabille, 1898)

Synonyms
- Butleria scylla Mabille, 1898

Species of butterfly

Dalla scylla is a species of butterfly in the family Hesperiidae. It is found in Bolivia.
