= Dalla superior =

Scientific classification
- Kingdom: Animalia
- Phylum: Arthropoda
- Class: Insecta
- Order: Lepidoptera
- Family: Hesperiidae
- Genus: Dalla
- Species: D. superior

Binomial name
- Dalla superior Draudt, 1923

Species of butterfly

Dalla superior is a species of butterfly in the family Hesperiidae. It is found in Ecuador and Colombia. The butterfly has a wingspan of 32mm to 37mm
