= Dalla jelskyi =

Scientific classification
- Kingdom: Animalia
- Phylum: Arthropoda
- Class: Insecta
- Order: Lepidoptera
- Family: Hesperiidae
- Genus: Dalla
- Species: D. jelskyi

Binomial name
- Dalla jelskyi (Erschoff, 1875)

Synonyms
- Heteropterus (Cyclopides) jelskyi Erschoff, 1875

Species of butterfly

Dalla jelskyi is a species of butterfly in the family Hesperiidae. It is found in Peru and Rio de Janeiro, Brazil.

== Subspecies ==
- Dalla jelskyi jelskyi - Peru
- Dalla jelskyi aurosa J. Zikán, 1938 - Rio de Janeiro, Brazil
