= Dalla grovius =

Scientific classification
- Kingdom: Animalia
- Phylum: Arthropoda
- Class: Insecta
- Order: Lepidoptera
- Family: Hesperiidae
- Genus: Dalla
- Species: D. grovius

Binomial name
- Dalla grovius (Mabille, 1898)

Synonyms
- Butleria grovius Mabille, 1898

Species of butterfly

Dalla grovius is a species of butterfly in the family Hesperiidae. It is found in Ecuador and Peru.

== Subspecies ==
- Dalla grovius grovius - Ecuador
- Dalla grovius amba Evans, 1955 - Ecuador
- Dalla grovius floxa Evans, 1955 - Peru
