= Dalla eryonas =

Scientific classification
- Kingdom: Animalia
- Phylum: Arthropoda
- Class: Insecta
- Order: Lepidoptera
- Family: Hesperiidae
- Genus: Dalla
- Species: D. eryonas

Binomial name
- Dalla eryonas (Hewitson, 1877)

Synonyms
- Cyclopides eryonas Hewitson, 1877; Butleria dolabella Plötz, 1884; Butleria fimbriola Godman, [1900]; Butleria troeschi Mabille, 1904 (nom. nud.)

Species of butterfly

Dalla eryonas is a species of butterfly in the family Hesperiidae. It is found from Panama to Brazil.
