= Dalla agathocles =

Scientific classification
- Kingdom: Animalia
- Phylum: Arthropoda
- Clade: Pancrustacea
- Class: Insecta
- Order: Lepidoptera
- Family: Hesperiidae
- Genus: Dalla
- Species: D. agathocles

Binomial name
- Dalla agathocles (C. & R. Felder, 1867)

Synonyms
- Carterocephalus agathocles C. & R. Felder, 1867; Butleria agathocles polydesma Mabille, 1889; Butleria polydesma Mabille, 1891 (preocc. Mabille, 1889)

Species of butterfly

Dalla agathocles is a species of butterfly in the family Hesperiidae. It is found in Venezuela, Colombia, Ecuador and Peru.

== Subspecies ==
- Dalla agathocles agathocles (Colombia)
- Dalla agathocles lanna Evans, 1955 (Ecuador)
- Dalla agathocles lonia Evans, 1955 (Peru)
- Dalla agathocles polydesma (Mabille, 1889) (Venezuela)
