= Dalla oxaites =

Scientific classification
- Kingdom: Animalia
- Phylum: Arthropoda
- Class: Insecta
- Order: Lepidoptera
- Family: Hesperiidae
- Genus: Dalla
- Species: D. oxaites

Binomial name
- Dalla oxaites (Hewitson, 1877)

Synonyms
- Cyclopides oxaites Hewitson, 1877; Butleria syrisca Mabille, 1898

Species of butterfly

Dalla oxaites is a species of butterfly in the family Hesperiidae. It is found in Bolivia and possibly Peru.
