= Dalla austini =

Scientific classification
- Kingdom: Animalia
- Phylum: Arthropoda
- Class: Insecta
- Order: Lepidoptera
- Family: Hesperiidae
- Genus: Dalla
- Species: D. austini

Binomial name
- Dalla austini A.D. Warren, 2011

Species of butterfly

Dalla austini is a species of butterfly in the family Hesperiidae. It is found in Chiapas, Mexico.
