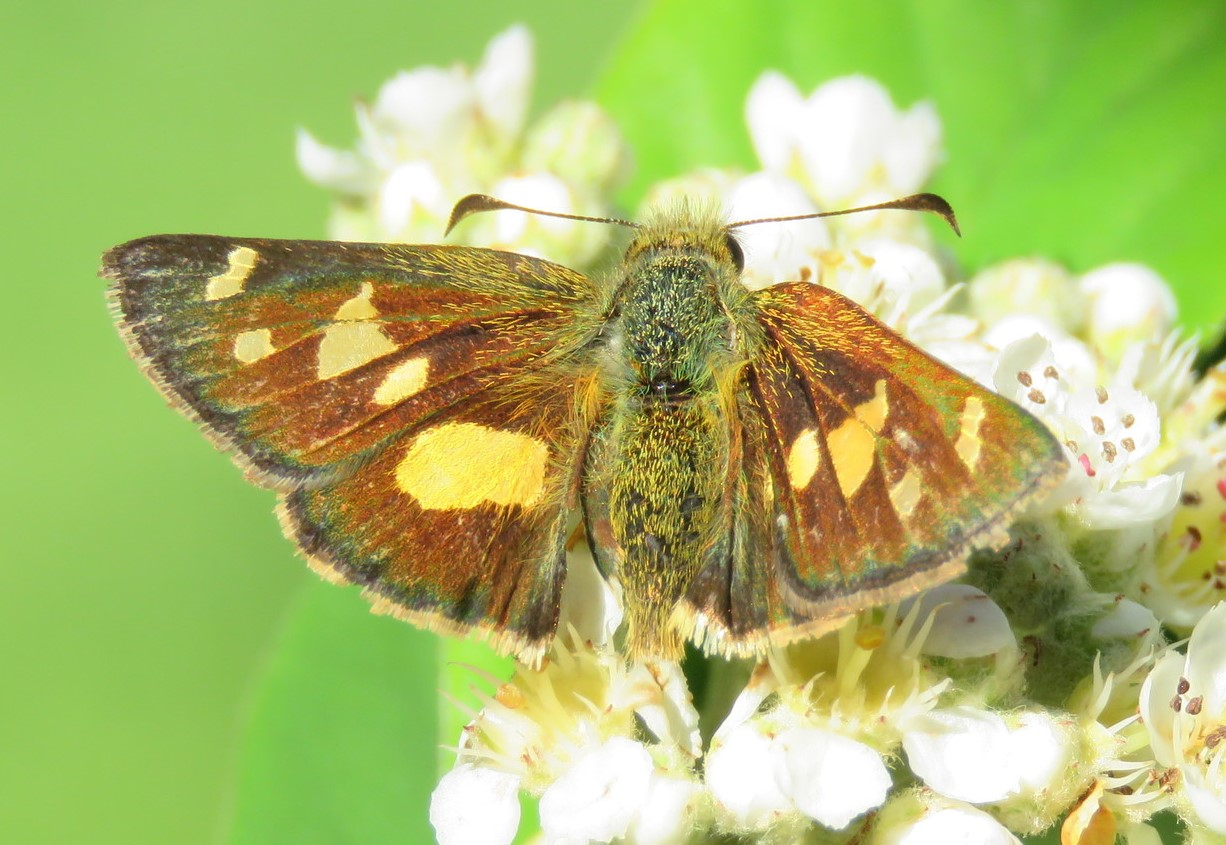

Scientific classification
- Kingdom: Animalia
- Phylum: Arthropoda
- Class: Insecta
- Order: Lepidoptera
- Family: Hesperiidae
- Genus: Dalla
- Species: D. quasca

Binomial name
- Dalla quasca Bell, 1947

Synonyms
- Dalla equatoria Bell, 1947

= Dalla quasca =

Species of butterfly

Dalla quasca is a species of butterfly in the family Hesperiidae. It is found in Colombia and Ecuador.

== Subspecies ==
- Dalla quasca quasca - Colombia
- Dalla quasca equatoria Bell, 1947 - Ecuador
