= Dalla lethaea =

Scientific classification
- Kingdom: Animalia
- Phylum: Arthropoda
- Class: Insecta
- Order: Lepidoptera
- Family: Hesperiidae
- Genus: Dalla
- Species: D. lethaea

Binomial name
- Dalla lethaea (Schaus, 1913)

Synonyms
- Butleria lethaea Schaus, 1913

Species of butterfly

Dalla lethaea is a species of butterfly in the family Hesperiidae. It is found in Mexico (Oaxaca) and Costa Rica.
