= Deka =

Deka, or DEKA may refer to:

- deka-, a variant spelling of deca-, a metric prefix
- Deka, Pomeranian Voivodeship, village in northern Poland
- DEKA (New Zealand), a defunct discount store chain, formerly in New Zealand
- DEKA (company), located in Manchester, New Hampshire in the United States
- Jadab Chandra Deka, Indian politician
- Ramesh C. Deka, specialist and the Director of All India Institute of Medical Sciences
- Tapan Deka, 28th director of the Intelligence Bureau, India
- Nilamani Sen Deka, former MLA and agriculture minister from 2011 to 2015.

== See also ==
- Deca (disambiguation)
