= Dalla hesperioides =

Scientific classification
- Kingdom: Animalia
- Phylum: Arthropoda
- Class: Insecta
- Order: Lepidoptera
- Family: Hesperiidae
- Genus: Dalla
- Species: D. hesperioides

Binomial name
- Dalla hesperioides (C. & R. Felder, [1867])

Synonyms
- Carterocephalus hesperioides C. & R. Felder, [1867]

Species of butterfly

Dalla hesperioides is a species of butterfly in the family Hesperiidae. It is found in Colombia and Peru.

== Subspecies ==
- Dalla hesperioides hesperioides - Colombia
- Dalla hesperioides hister Evans, 1955 - Peru
