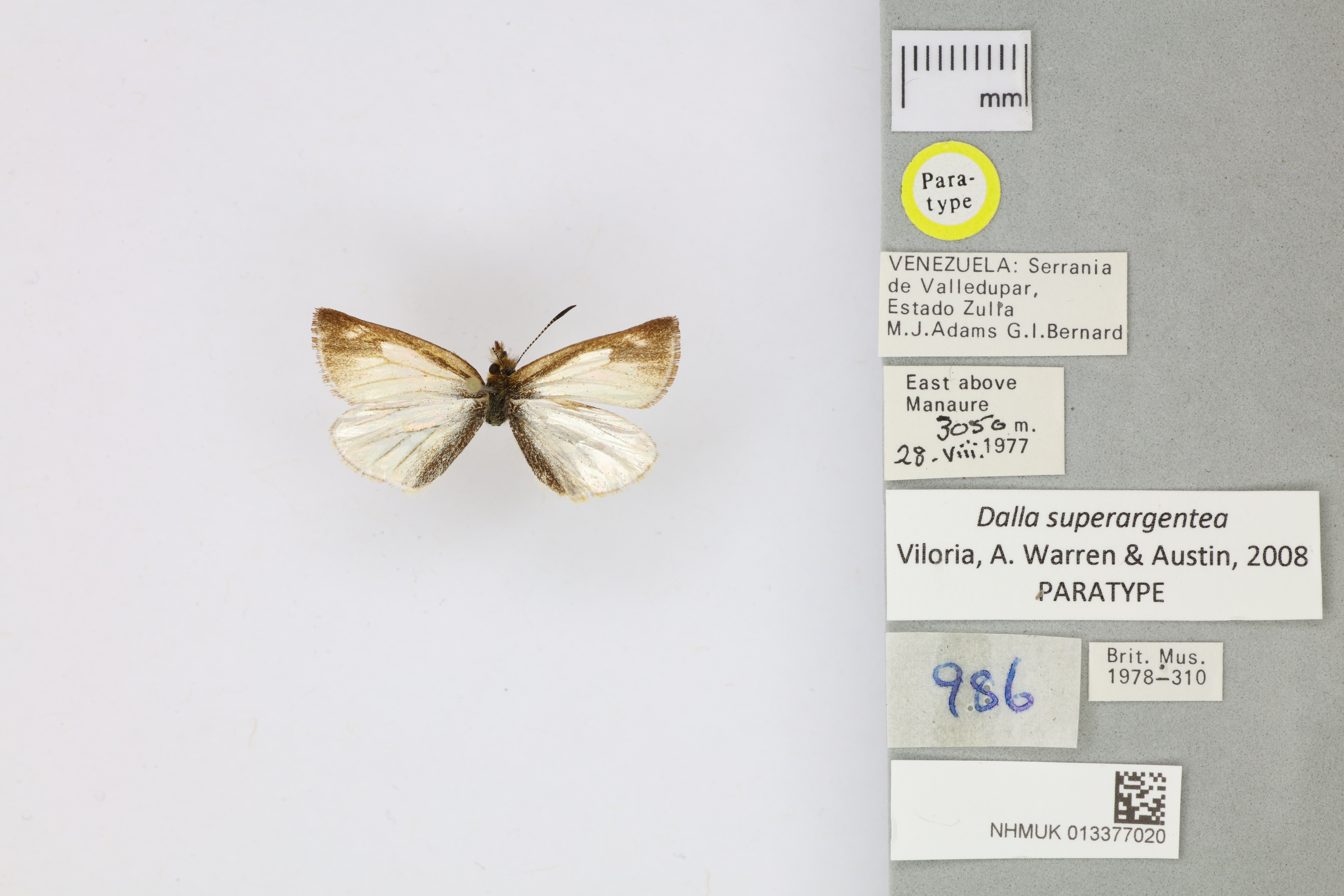

Scientific classification
- Kingdom: Animalia
- Phylum: Arthropoda
- Class: Insecta
- Order: Lepidoptera
- Family: Hesperiidae
- Genus: Dalla
- Species: D. superargentea

Binomial name
- Dalla superargentea Viloria, Warren & Austin, 2008

= Dalla superargentea =

Species of butterfly

Dalla superargentea is a species of butterfly in the family Hesperiidae. It is found in Venezuela and Colombia.
