= Dalla wardi =

Scientific classification
- Kingdom: Animalia
- Phylum: Arthropoda
- Class: Insecta
- Order: Lepidoptera
- Family: Hesperiidae
- Genus: Dalla
- Species: D. wardi

Binomial name
- Dalla wardi Steinhauser, 2002

Species of butterfly

Dalla wardi is a species of butterfly in the family Hesperiidae. It is found in Colombia.
