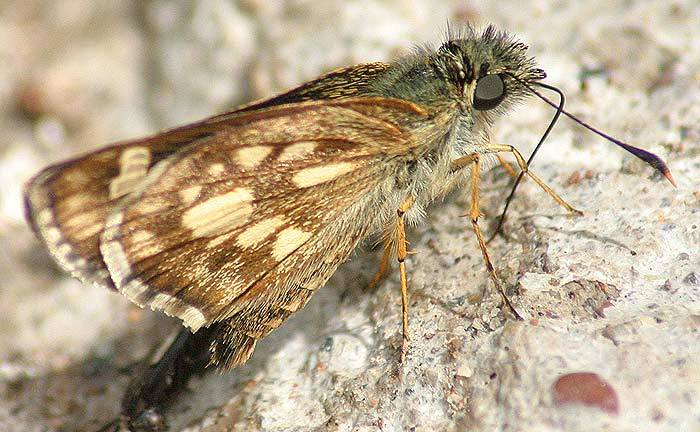

Scientific classification
- Kingdom: Animalia
- Phylum: Arthropoda
- Class: Insecta
- Order: Lepidoptera
- Family: Hesperiidae
- Genus: Dalla
- Species: D. dividuum

Binomial name
- Dalla dividuum (Dyar, 1913)

Synonyms
- Argopteron dividuum Dyar, 1913

= Dalla dividuum =

Species of butterfly

Dalla dividuum is a species of butterfly in the family Hesperiidae. It is found in Mexico.
