= Rubias =

Rubias may refer to:

== Places ==
- Rubiás, Calvos de Randín, Ourense, Galiza, Spain; a village
- Rubias, Yauco, Puerto Rico; a barrio
- Las Rubias, a rivulet in Andés, Navia, Asturias, Spain

== Other uses ==
- Las Rubias, a TV talk show on Net TV (Argentina)

== See also ==
- Rubia (disambiguation)
