= Dalla dognini =

Scientific classification
- Kingdom: Animalia
- Phylum: Arthropoda
- Class: Insecta
- Order: Lepidoptera
- Family: Hesperiidae
- Genus: Dalla
- Species: D. dognini

Binomial name
- Dalla dognini (Mabille, 1889)

Synonyms
- Butleria dognini Mabille, 1889

Species of butterfly

Dalla dognini is a species of butterfly in the family Hesperiidae. It is found in Ecuador.
