= Dalla xantha =

Scientific classification
- Kingdom: Animalia
- Phylum: Arthropoda
- Class: Insecta
- Order: Lepidoptera
- Family: Hesperiidae
- Genus: Dalla
- Species: D. xantha

Binomial name
- Dalla xantha Steinhauser, 1991

Species of butterfly

Dalla xantha is a species of butterfly in the family Hesperiidae. It is found in Colombia.
