= Freemaniana =

Scientific classification
- Kingdom: Animalia
- Phylum: Arthropoda
- Class: Insecta
- Order: Lepidoptera
- Family: Hesperiidae
- Subfamily: Heteropterinae
- Genus: Freemaniana

Genus of butterflies

Freemaniana is a genus of skippers in the family Hesperiidae.
