= Ladda carnis =

Scientific classification
- Kingdom: Animalia
- Phylum: Arthropoda
- Class: Insecta
- Order: Lepidoptera
- Family: Hesperiidae
- Genus: Ladda
- Species: L. carnis

Binomial name
- Ladda carnis (Evans, 1955)

Synonyms
- Dalla carnis Evans, 1955

Species of butterfly

Ladda carnis is a species of butterfly in the family Hesperiidae. It is found in Bolivia and Peru.

== Subspecies ==
- Ladda carnis carnis - Bolivia
- Ladda carnis sondra Evans, 1955 - Peru
