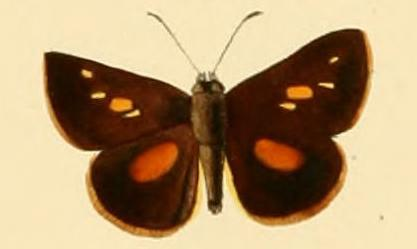

Scientific classification
- Kingdom: Animalia
- Phylum: Arthropoda
- Clade: Pancrustacea
- Class: Insecta
- Order: Lepidoptera
- Family: Hesperiidae
- Genus: Ladda
- Species: L. caenides

Binomial name
- Ladda caenides (Hewitson, 1868)

Synonyms
- Cyclopides caenides Hewitson, 1868; Butelria coenides Dognin, 1887 (misspelling); Dalla caenides (Hewitson, 1868)

= Ladda caenides =

Species of butterfly

Ladda caenides is a species of butterfly in the family Hesperiidae. It is found in Venezuela.
