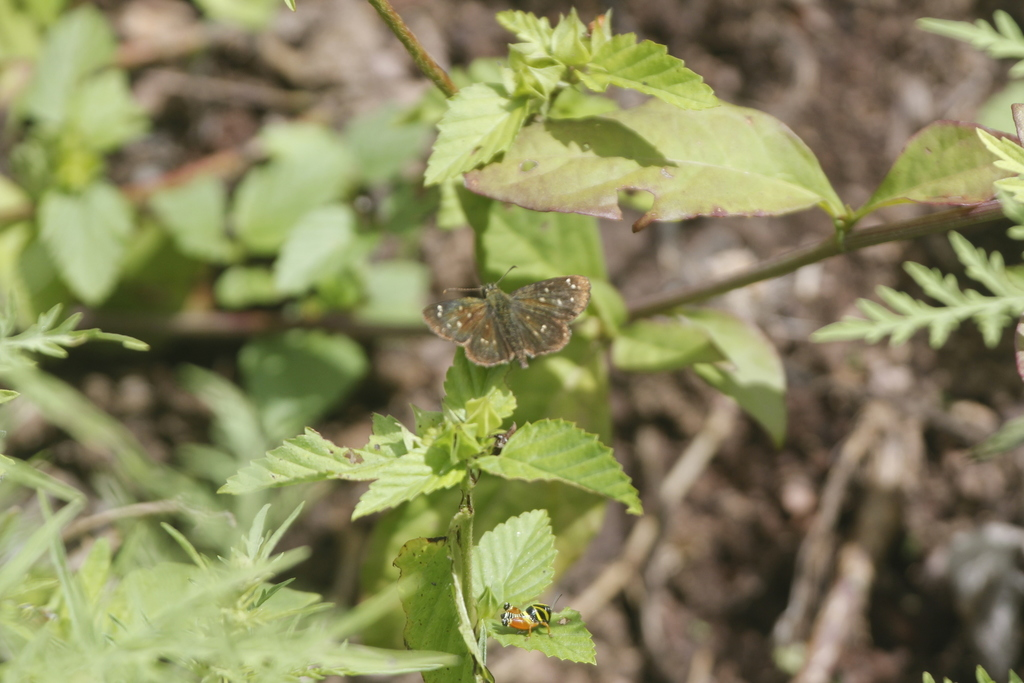

Scientific classification
- Kingdom: Animalia
- Phylum: Arthropoda
- Class: Insecta
- Order: Lepidoptera
- Family: Hesperiidae
- Genus: Piruna
- Species: P. roeveri

Binomial name
- Piruna roeveri (L.D. Miller & J.Y. Miller, 1972)

Synonyms
- Dalla roeveri L.D. Miller & J.Y. Miller, 1972

= Piruna roeveri =

Species of butterfly

Piruna roeveri is a butterfly in the family Hesperiidae. It is found in Mexico.
