= Ladda cuadrada =

Scientific classification
- Kingdom: Animalia
- Phylum: Arthropoda
- Class: Insecta
- Order: Lepidoptera
- Family: Hesperiidae
- Genus: Ladda
- Species: L. cuadrada

Binomial name
- Ladda cuadrada (Weeks, 1901)

Synonyms
- Pamphila cuadrada Weeks, 1901; Dalla cuadrada (Weeks, 1901)

Species of butterfly

Ladda cuadrada is a species of butterfly in the family Hesperiidae. It is primarily found in Bolivia.
