= Ladda quadristriga =

Scientific classification
- Kingdom: Animalia
- Phylum: Arthropoda
- Class: Insecta
- Order: Lepidoptera
- Family: Hesperiidae
- Genus: Ladda
- Species: L. quadristriga

Binomial name
- Ladda quadristriga (Mabille, 1889)

Synonyms
- List: Butleria quadristriga Mabille, 1889; Butleria 4-striga Dognin, 1887; Butleria protasius Dognin, 1887; Butleria quadristriga Mabille, 1891; Butleria catochra Mabille, 1898; Dalla quadristriga (Mabille, 1889)

Species of butterfly

Ladda quadristriga is a species of butterfly in the family Hesperiidae. It is found in Venezuela, Peru, Bolivia and Ecuador.

== Subspecies ==
- Ladda quadristriga quadristriga - Ecuador, Venezuela
- Ladda quadristriga regia Evans, 1955 - Peru
- Ladda quadristriga rota Evans, 1955 - Bolivia
