= Ladda vista =

Scientific classification
- Kingdom: Animalia
- Phylum: Arthropoda
- Clade: Pancrustacea
- Class: Insecta
- Order: Lepidoptera
- Family: Hesperiidae
- Genus: Ladda
- Species: L. vista

Binomial name
- Ladda vista (Steinhauser, 2002)

Synonyms
- Dalla vista Steinhauser, 2002

Species of butterfly

Ladda vista is a species of butterfly in the family Hesperiidae. It is found in Ecuador.
