= Grace Decca =

Grace Decca Ndom'a Deccah Grace
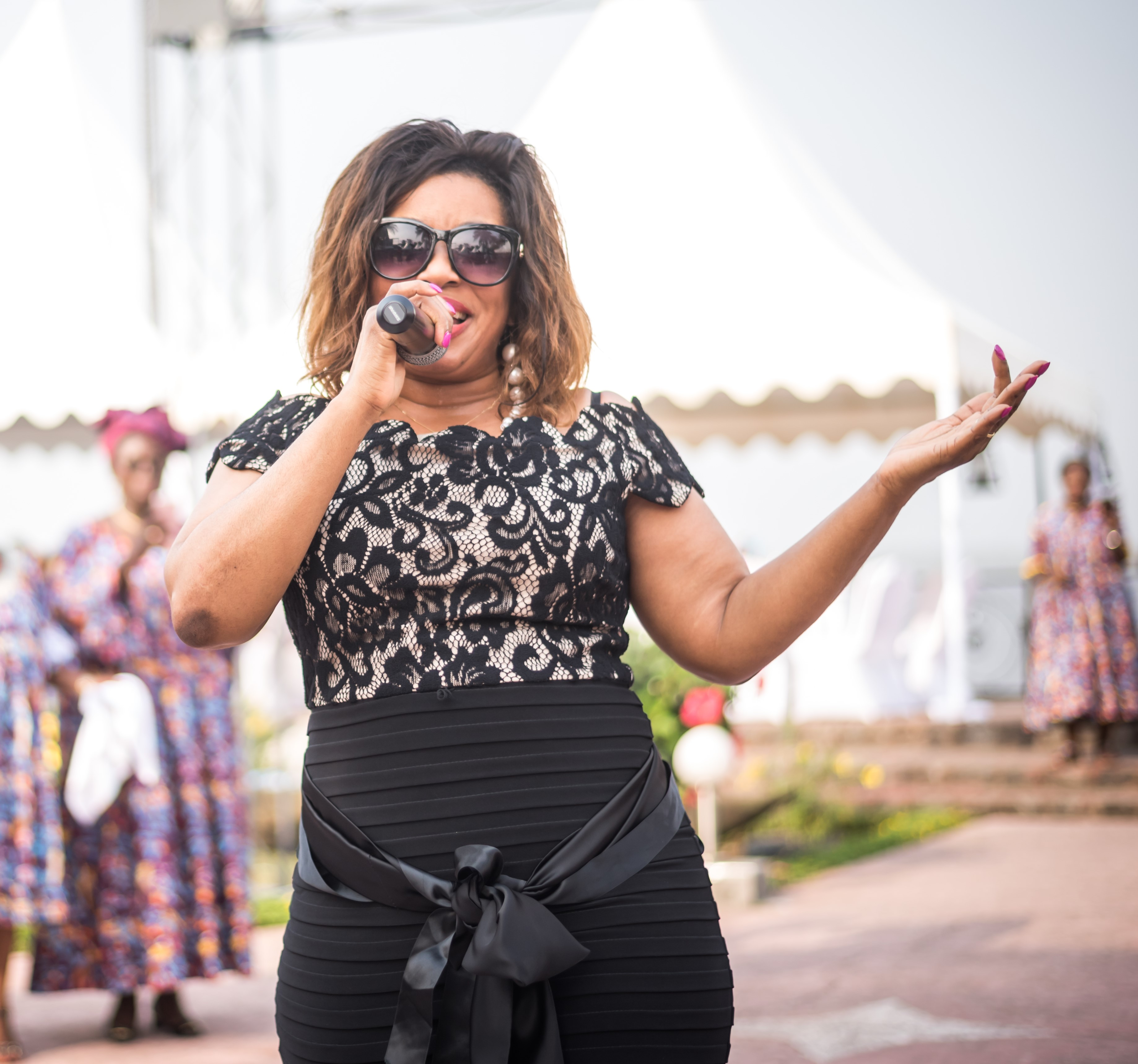

Background information
- Born: 23 September 1966 (age 58)
- Origin: Douala, Cameroon
- Genres: Makossa, gospel

Grace Decca (born Ndom'a Deccah Grace on 23 September 1966) is a Cameroonian singer and producer from Douala, the country's economic capital. She is the younger sister of Ben Decca, a well-known Makossa singer, and she worked alongside him and other musicians like Jean Jacques Goldman before establishing her own career in 1989 with the album Besoin d'amour.. Her five other Makossa albums are Le Duo D.K (1992), Doï La Mulema (1993), Appelle-moi Princesse (1998), and Donne-moi un peu d'amour (2001). She returned to the Cameroonian music scene in 2014 with a gospel album, Mouna. She has also started her own label, GNS Productions.

== Early life and family ==
Born in Cameroon, in the city of Douala, Decca is the sixth child in a family of eleven children. Her father was an automobile expert and her mother a teacher. With four famous artists including her elder brother Ben, her younger sister Dora and her younger brother Isaac, her family is well known on the Cameroonian music scene. She is also the niece of the late Eboa Lotin, and great granddaughter of musician Lobe Lobe Rameau, one of the pioneers of Makossa.

== Education and early career ==
She holds a DEA in Communication (Sciences of Education), obtained in France in 1998. After obtaining her Baccalauréat, Decca left for France to continue her studies. She obtained a DEUG in Culture and Communication, a BTS in Management Tools, as well as a Bachelor and a master's degree.

She was introduced to music in the early 1980s by her elder brother, Ben, with whom she made choruses. In 1983, she was featured in his single "Na sengui bobe" which was a success. In 1987, she was featured in the chorus of the song titled À nos actes manqués, by the French singer, Jean-Jacques Goldman.

== Career ==
She performed alongside her brother between 1984 and 1989, before starting her own solo career. Decca released her first album in 1989 with the title Besoin d'amour. The album, featuring five songs, sold more than 150,000 copies in Cameroon and helped her gain popularity.

In 1993, she released a second album, Doi La Mulema, which was even more successful than her first, which helped her gain international acclaim. Five years later, Decca returned to the music scene with the release of her third album called Appelle-moi-Princesse, which brought her a number of awards, including: Best Female Album of the Year, Best-Selling Female of the Year, and the Bertrand Folon Award for Artistic maturity.

In 2001, Decca released her fourth album, Donne-moi un peu d'amour, which included eight tracks and was produced by J.P.S. Productions. She later started her own label, GNS Productions, which is still active. She has also produced the albums of several emerging artists such as Joly Din and her younger brother, Isaac Decca.

=== Mouna, the comeback ===
Thirteen years after the release of Donne-moi un peu d'amour, Grace made a comeback with an album which was different from her previous four. Namely, for her fifth album, Decca chose gospel music. The album, titled Mouna (Burden in the Douala language) was produced in the United States by George Duke, who also wrote two songs on it. Due to this album being made up of thirteen songs sung in English, French and Douala, Decca was able to perform alongside renowned musicians such as Sheila E., Jeffrey Osborne, Jonathan Butler, Chino XL, Paul Jackson Jr., Kirk Whalum, Alex AI, Teddy Campbell, Howard Hewett and Erik Zobble.

== Discography ==
=== Albums ===
- 1989 : Besoin d'amour
- 1992 : Le Duo D.K
- 1993 : Doï La Mulema
- 1998 : Appelle-moi Princesse
- 2001 : Donne-moi un peu d'amour
- 2014 : Mouna

=== Collaborations ===
- 1983 : Na sengui bobe with Ben Decca
- 1987 : À nos actes manqués by Jean-Jacques Goldman
- 2002 : Associé with Elvis Kemayo
- 2003 : Bébé d'amour and Muna by Isaac Decca
- 2005 : Mokili mobimba with Nyboma

== Prizes and awards ==
- 1993: Best Female Album of the Year
- 1993: Best Female Artist
- 1993: Two nominations at the African Awards in Abidjan, Ivory Coast
- 1998: Best Female Album of the Year (for "Appelle-moi princesse")
- 1998: Best-Selling Female Artist of the Year
- 1999: Female Album of the Year
- 2001: Bernard Folon Prize for artistic maturity
- 2002: Best-Selling Female Artist of the Year (for Donne-moi un peu d'amour)
- 2002: Best Makossa and Female Album of the Year
- 2003: Award of Artistic Excellence to an African Lady

== Personal life ==
Decca is married to former CEO of Cameroon Airline Camair-Co, Jean Paul Nana Sandjo, with whom she has several children..
