= Ladda eburones =

Scientific classification
- Kingdom: Animalia
- Phylum: Arthropoda
- Class: Insecta
- Order: Lepidoptera
- Family: Hesperiidae
- Genus: Ladda
- Species: L. eburones

Binomial name
- Ladda eburones (Hewitson, 1877)

Synonyms
- List: Cyclopides eburones Hewitson, 1877; Butleria merula Mabille, 1898; Pholisora eburones inornata Bell, 1937; Dalla eburones (Hewitson, 1877)

Species of butterfly

Ladda eburones is a species of butterfly in the family Hesperiidae. It is found in Ecuador, Colombia, Peru and Bolivia.

== Subspecies ==
- Ladda eburones eburones (Bolivia)
- Ladda eburones ena Evans, 1955 (Peru)
- Ladda eburones inornata (Bell, 1937) (Ecuador, Colombia)
