= Ladda ochrolimbata =

Scientific classification
- Kingdom: Animalia
- Phylum: Arthropoda
- Class: Insecta
- Order: Lepidoptera
- Family: Hesperiidae
- Genus: Ladda
- Species: L. ochrolimbata

Binomial name
- Ladda ochrolimbata (Draudt, 1923)

Synonyms
- Dalla ochrolimbata Draudt, 1923

Species of insect

Ladda ochrolimbata is a species of butterfly in the family Hesperiidae. It is found in Peru.
