= Ladda puracensis =

Scientific classification
- Kingdom: Animalia
- Phylum: Arthropoda
- Class: Insecta
- Order: Lepidoptera
- Family: Hesperiidae
- Genus: Ladda
- Species: L. puracensis

Binomial name
- Ladda puracensis (Steinhauser, 1991)

Synonyms
- Dalla puracensis Steinhauser, 1991

Species of butterfly

Ladda puracensis is a species of butterfly in the family Hesperiidae. It is found in Colombia and Ecuador.

== Subspecies ==
- Ladda puracensis puracensis - Colombia
- Ladda puracensis cotopa Steinhauser, 1991 - Ecuador
- Ladda puracensis quindio Steinhauser, 1991 - Colombia
