= Ladda decca =

Scientific classification
- Kingdom: Animalia
- Phylum: Arthropoda
- Class: Insecta
- Order: Lepidoptera
- Family: Hesperiidae
- Genus: Ladda
- Species: L. decca

Binomial name
- Ladda decca (Evans, 1955)

Synonyms
- Dalla decca Evans, 1955

Species of butterfly

Ladda decca is a species of butterfly in the family Hesperiidae. It is found in Ecuador and Peru.

== Subspecies ==
- Ladda decca decca - Ecuador
- Ladda decca doppa Evans, 1955 - Peru
