= Ladda calima =

Scientific classification
- Kingdom: Animalia
- Phylum: Arthropoda
- Class: Insecta
- Order: Lepidoptera
- Family: Hesperiidae
- Genus: Ladda
- Species: L. calima

Binomial name
- Ladda calima (Steinhauser, 1991)

Synonyms
- Dalla calima Steinhauser, 1991

Species of butterfly

Ladda calima is a species of butterfly in the family Hesperiidae. It is found in Colombia.
