= Ladda pedro =

Scientific classification
- Kingdom: Animalia
- Phylum: Arthropoda
- Class: Insecta
- Order: Lepidoptera
- Family: Hesperiidae
- Genus: Ladda
- Species: L. pedro

Binomial name
- Ladda pedro (Steinhauser, 2002)

Synonyms
- Dalla pedro Steinhauser, 2002

Species of butterfly

Ladda pedro is a species of butterfly in the family Hesperiidae. It is found in Colombia.
