= Ladda rubia =

Scientific classification
- Kingdom: Animalia
- Phylum: Arthropoda
- Clade: Pancrustacea
- Class: Insecta
- Order: Lepidoptera
- Family: Hesperiidae
- Genus: Ladda
- Species: L. rubia

Binomial name
- Ladda rubia (Evans, 1955)

Synonyms
- Dalla rubia Evans, 1955

Species of butterfly

Ladda rubia is a species of butterfly in the family Hesperiidae. It is found in Peru.
