= Ladda ticidas =

Scientific classification
- Kingdom: Animalia
- Phylum: Arthropoda
- Class: Insecta
- Order: Lepidoptera
- Family: Hesperiidae
- Genus: Ladda
- Species: L. ticidas

Binomial name
- Ladda ticidas (Mabille, 1898)

Synonyms
- Butleria ticidas Mabille, 1898; Dalla ticidas (Mabille, 1898)

Species of butterfly

Ladda ticidas is a species of butterfly in the family Hesperiidae. It is found in Bolivia.
