= Ladda celsus =

Scientific classification
- Kingdom: Animalia
- Phylum: Arthropoda
- Class: Insecta
- Order: Lepidoptera
- Family: Hesperiidae
- Genus: Ladda
- Species: L. celsus

Binomial name
- Ladda celsus (Steinhauser, 2002)

Synonyms
- Dalla celsus Steinhauser, 2002

Species of butterfly

Ladda celsus is a species of butterfly in the family Hesperiidae. It is found in Ecuador.
