= Ladda connexa =

Scientific classification
- Kingdom: Animalia
- Phylum: Arthropoda
- Class: Insecta
- Order: Lepidoptera
- Family: Hesperiidae
- Genus: Ladda
- Species: L. connexa

Binomial name
- Ladda connexa (Draudt, 1923)

Synonyms
- Dalla connexa Draudt, 1923

Species of butterfly

Ladda connexa is a species of butterfly in the family Hesperiidae. It is found in Colombia.
