= Eider Gardiazabal =

Spanish politician (born 1975)

Eider Gardiazabal Rubial
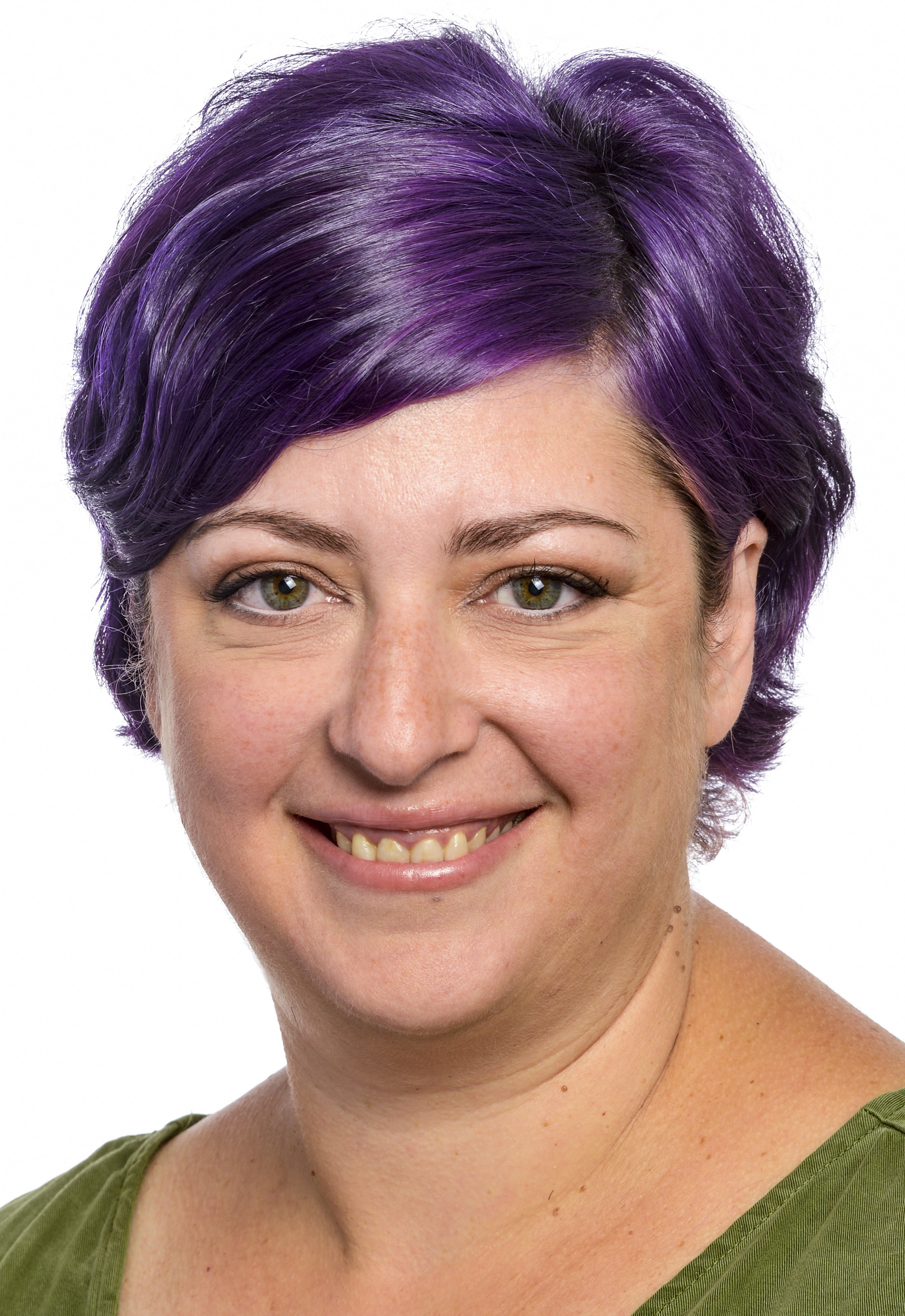

Member of the European Parliament
- Incumbent
- Assumed office 14 July 2009
- Constituency: Spain

Personal details
- Born: 12 July 1975 (age 50) Bilbao, Basque Country, Spain
- Party: Spanish Socialist Workers Party
- Occupation: Politician

Eider Gardiazabal Rubial is a Spanish politician of the Spanish Socialist Workers' Party (PSOE) who has been serving as a Member of the European Parliament since the 2009 elections.

== Political career ==
Since joining the European Parliament, Gardiazabal Rubial has been serving as a member of the Committee on Budgets. She is also her parliamentary group's coordinator on the committee. In this capacity, she was the parliament's rapporteur on the 2015 budget (along with Monika Hohlmeier) and on the COVID-19 pandemic recovery fund in 2020 (along with Siegfried Mureşan and Dragoș Pîslaru). In 2019, she drafted (together with Petri Sarvamaa) legislation on cutting EU funds to member states that undermine the rule of law.

In addition to her committee assignments, Gardiazabal Rubial is a member of the delegation to the ACP–EU Joint Parliamentary Assembly. She is also part of the Spinelli Group, the European Parliament Intergroup on LGBT Rights and of the European Parliament Intergroup on Integrity (Transparency, Anti-Corruption and Organized Crime).

== Personal life ==
Her mother Lentxu Rubial and grandfather Ramón Rubial were both members of the Senate of Spain (Biscay constituency) representing the PSOE, the latter also serving as president of the party between 1976 and 1999.
