= Ladda monospila =

Scientific classification
- Kingdom: Animalia
- Phylum: Arthropoda
- Class: Insecta
- Order: Lepidoptera
- Family: Hesperiidae
- Genus: Ladda
- Species: L. monospila

Binomial name
- Ladda monospila (Mabille, 1898)

Synonyms
- Butleria monospila Mabille, 1898; Dalla monospila (Mabille, 1898)

Species of butterfly

Ladda monospila is a species of butterfly in the family Hesperiidae. It is found in Bolivia.
