= Rubia Syed =

Indian cricketer

Personal information
- Full name: Rubia Syed Sheikh
- Born: 10 May 1994 (age 32); Anantnag, Jammu and Kashmir
- Batting: Right-handed
- Bowling: Right-arm medium-fast

Domestic team information
- Years: Team
- 2011–2017: Jammu and Kashmir Women

Career statistics
Competition	List A	Twenty20
Matches	24	21
Runs scored	213	215
Batting average	9.26	13.43
100s/50s	0/1	0/1
Top score	50*	57
Balls bowled	510	325
Wickets	8	11
Bowling average	41.87	26.18
5 wickets in innings	0	0
10 wickets in match	0	0
Best bowling	2/24	2/10
Catches/stumpings	4	2
- Source: CricketArchive, 1 January 2018

Rubia Syed (born 10 May 1994) is an Indian cricketer. She hails from Anantnag, located in Jammu and represented Jammu & Kashmir Cricket Association (JKCA).

== Early life ==
Rubia was worn in Anantnag, a district of Jammu and Kashmir. Her father Ghulam Qadir Sheikh, is a fruit merchant
