= Dalla polycrates =

Scientific classification
- Kingdom: Animalia
- Phylum: Arthropoda
- Class: Insecta
- Order: Lepidoptera
- Family: Hesperiidae
- Genus: Dalla
- Species: D. polycrates

Binomial name
- Dalla polycrates (C. & R. Felder, 1867)

Synonyms
- Carterocephalus polycrates C. & R. Felder, 1867

Species of butterfly

Dalla polycrates is a species of butterfly in the family Hesperiidae. It is found in Peru, Colombia and Ecuador.

== Subspecies ==
- Dalla polycrates polycrates - Colombia
- Dalla polycrates ambala Evans, 1955 - Ecuador
- Dalla polycrates lania Evans, 1955 - Peru
