= Ladda seirocastnia =

Scientific classification
- Kingdom: Animalia
- Phylum: Arthropoda
- Class: Insecta
- Order: Lepidoptera
- Family: Hesperiidae
- Genus: Ladda
- Species: L. seirocastnia

Binomial name
- Ladda seirocastnia (Draudt), 1923

Synonyms
- Dalla seirocastnia Draudt, 1923

Species of butterfly

Ladda seirocastnia is a species of butterfly in the family Hesperiidae. It is found in Colombia.
