= Ladda ibhara =

Scientific classification
- Kingdom: Animalia
- Phylum: Arthropoda
- Clade: Pancrustacea
- Class: Insecta
- Order: Lepidoptera
- Family: Hesperiidae
- Genus: Ladda
- Species: L. ibhara

Binomial name
- Ladda ibhara (Butler, 1870)

Synonyms
- List: Thanaos ibhara Butler, 1870; Butleria boliviensis Mabille, 1898; Pamphila reedi Weeks, 1901; Dalla ibhara (Butler, 1870)

Species of butterfly

Ladda ibhara is a species of butterfly in the family Hesperiidae. It is found in Venezuela, Ecuador, Bolivia, Peru and Brazil.
