= Dalla mesoxantha =

Scientific classification
- Kingdom: Animalia
- Phylum: Arthropoda
- Class: Insecta
- Order: Lepidoptera
- Family: Hesperiidae
- Genus: Dalla
- Species: D. mesoxantha

Binomial name
- Dalla mesoxantha (Plötz, 1884)

Synonyms
- Butleria mesoxantha Plötz, 1884; Hesperia mesoxanthus Menétriés, 1857; Butleria virius Mabille, 1898; Dalla gelus fraterculus Bryk, 1953

Species of butterfly

Dalla mesoxantha is a species of butterfly in the family Hesperiidae. It is found in Venezuela, Ecuador and Peru.
