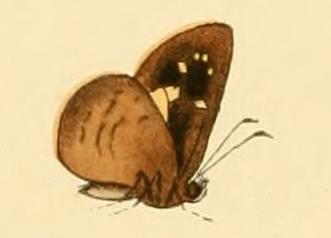

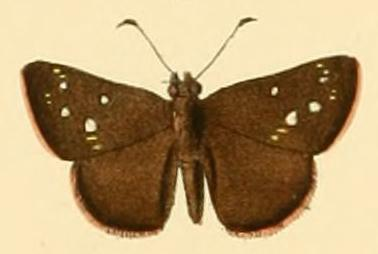

Scientific classification
- Kingdom: Animalia
- Phylum: Arthropoda
- Class: Insecta
- Order: Lepidoptera
- Family: Hesperiidae
- Genus: Ladda
- Species: L. crithote

Binomial name
- Ladda crithote (Hewitson, 1874)

Synonyms
- Cyclopides crithote Hewitson, 1874; Butleria erithote Mabille, 1898 [lapsus]; Dalla crithote (Hewitson, 1874)

= Ladda crithote =

Species of butterfly

Ladda crithote is a species of butterfly in the family Hesperiidae. It is found in Ecuador.
