= Lentxu Rubial =

Spanish politician

- Born: Leonor Rubial Cachorro; 6 April 1945; Erandio, Biscay, Spain
- Died: 21 December 2013 (aged 68); Bilbao, Spain
- Occupation: Politician
- Political party: Socialist Party of the Basque Country–Basque Country Left; Spanish Socialist Workers' Party
- Children: Eider Gardiazabal
- Relatives: Ramón Rubial (father)

Leonor Rubial Cachorro (6 April 1945 – 21 December 2013) was a Spanish politician from the PSOE (Spanish Socialist Workers' Party). She was a member of the Senate from 2004 to 2011.
