= Ladda granites =

Scientific classification
- Kingdom: Animalia
- Phylum: Arthropoda
- Class: Insecta
- Order: Lepidoptera
- Family: Hesperiidae
- Genus: Ladda
- Species: L. granites

Binomial name
- Ladda granites (Mabille, 1898)

Synonyms
- Butleria granites Mabille, 1898; Dalla granites (Mabille, 1898)

Species of butterfly

Ladda granites is a species of butterfly in the family Hesperiidae. It is found in Ecuador and Bolivia.

== Subspecies ==
- Ladda granites granites - Ecuador
- Ladda granites privata Draudt, 1923 - Bolivia
