= Dalla hilina =

Scientific classification
- Kingdom: Animalia
- Phylum: Arthropoda
- Class: Insecta
- Order: Lepidoptera
- Family: Hesperiidae
- Genus: Dalla
- Species: D. hilina

Binomial name
- Dalla hilina (Butler, 1870)

Synonyms
- Carterocephalus hilina Butler, 1870

Species of butterfly

Dalla hilina is a species of butterfly in the family Hesperiidae. It is found in Venezuela.
