= Ladda xicca =

Scientific classification
- Kingdom: Animalia
- Phylum: Arthropoda
- Class: Insecta
- Order: Lepidoptera
- Family: Hesperiidae
- Genus: Ladda
- Species: L. xicca

Binomial name
- Ladda xicca (Dyar, 1913)

Synonyms
- Argopteron xicca Dyar, 1913; Dalla xicca (Dyar, 1913)

Species of butterfly

Ladda xicca is a species of butterfly in the family Hesperiidae. It is found in Peru and Bolivia.

== Subspecies ==
- Ladda xicca xicca - Peru
- Ladda xicca paza Evans, 1955 - Bolivia
