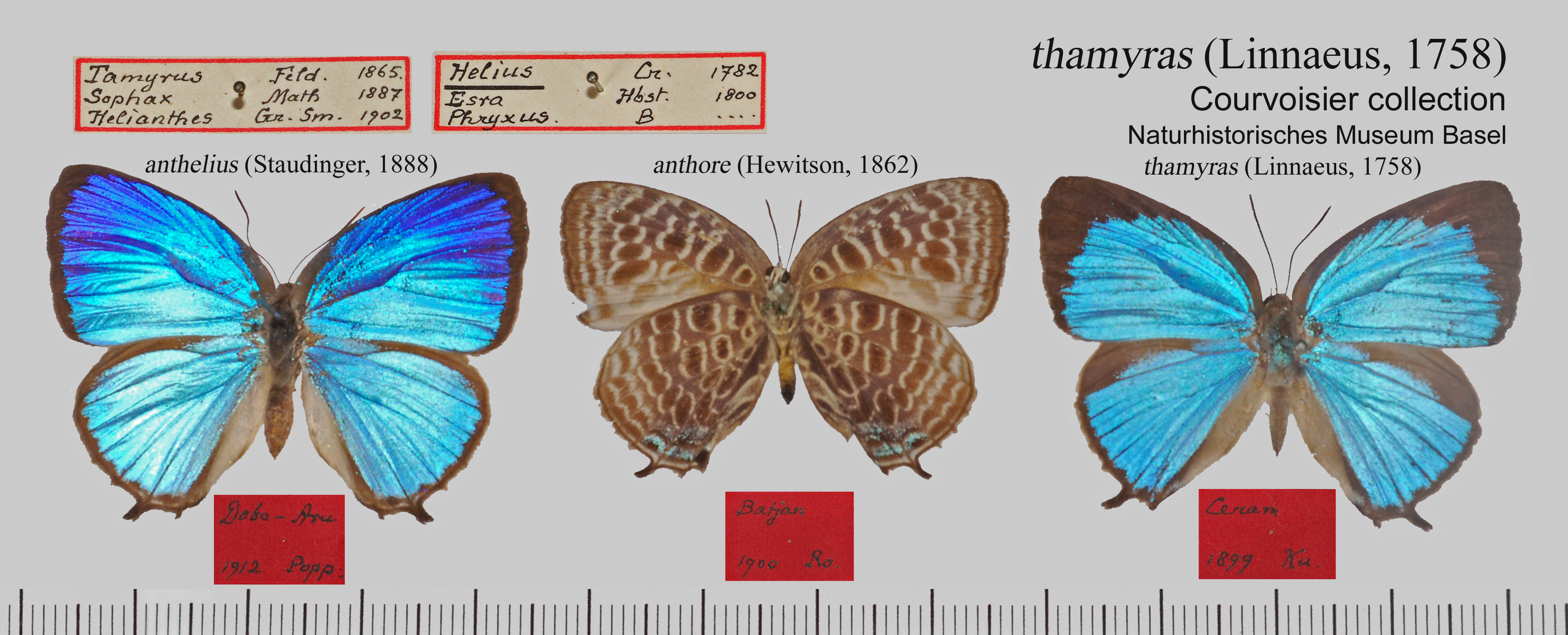
- From the Courvoisier Collection, Basel, Switzerland
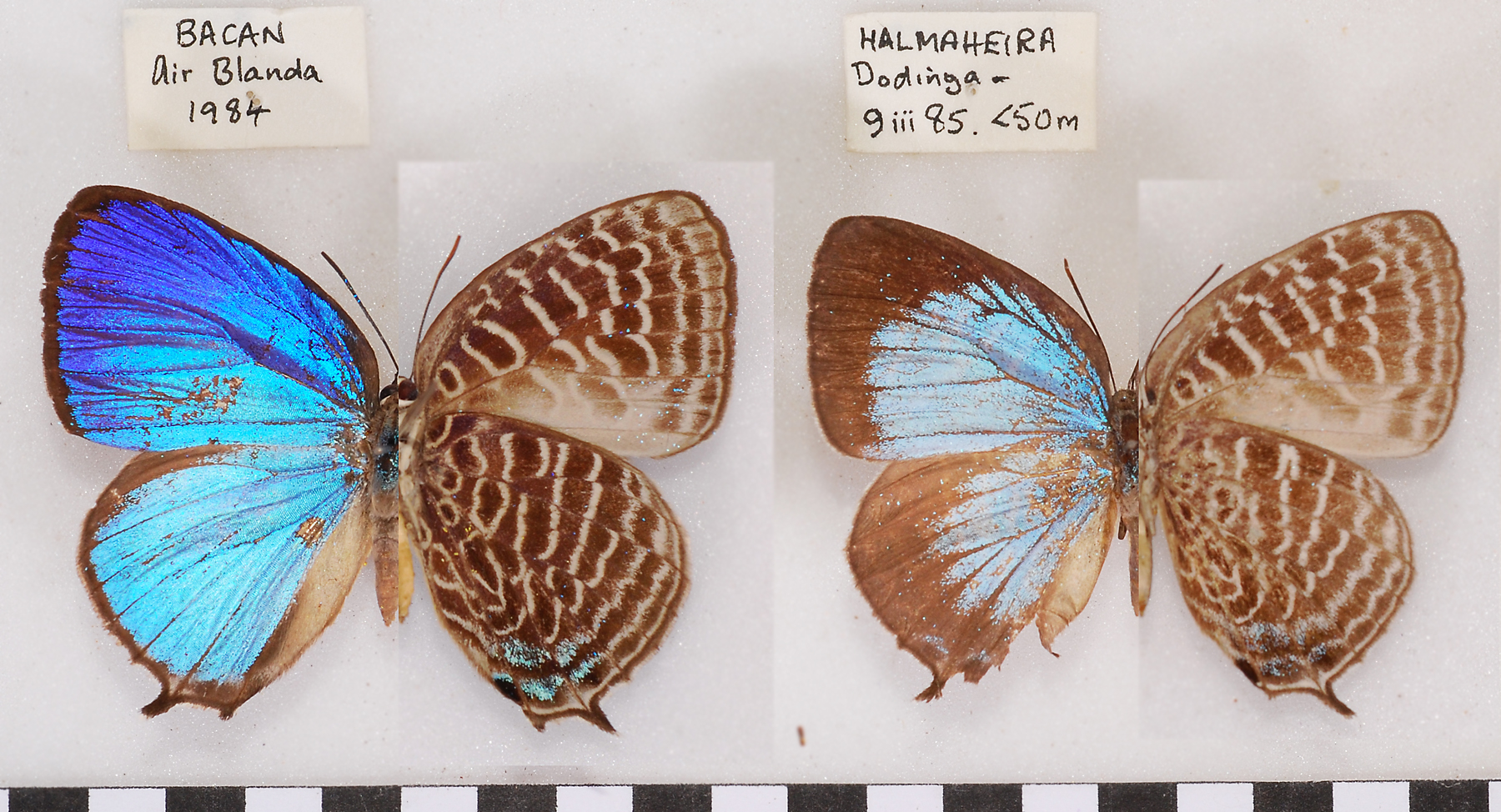
- A. t. anthore

Scientific classification
- Kingdom: Animalia
- Phylum: Arthropoda
- Clade: Pancrustacea
- Class: Insecta
- Order: Lepidoptera
- Family: Lycaenidae
- Genus: Arhopala
- Species: A. thamyras

Binomial name
- Arhopala thamyras (Linnaeus, 1758)

Synonyms
- Papilio thamyras Linnaeus, 1758; Papilio helius Cramer, 1779; Papilio esra Herbst, 1800; Arhopala helius var. anthelius Staudinger, 1888; Arhopala thamyras calaureia Fruhstorfer, 1914; Amblypodia anthore Hewitson, 1862; Arhopala thamyras potidaea Fruhstorfer, 1914; Amblypodia minnetta Butler, 1882; Arhopala phryxus Boisduval, 1832; Amblypodia sophax Mathew, 1887; Arhopala helius var. latimarginata Strand, 1912; Arhopala interniplaga Strand, 1912; Arhopala thamyras teuthrone Fruhstorfer, 1914; Arhopala thamyras zelea Fruhstorfer, 1914

= Arhopala thamyras =

Species of butterfly

Arhopala thamyras is a butterfly in the family Lycaenidae. It was described by Carl Linnaeus in 1758. It is found in the Australasian realm.

== Description ==
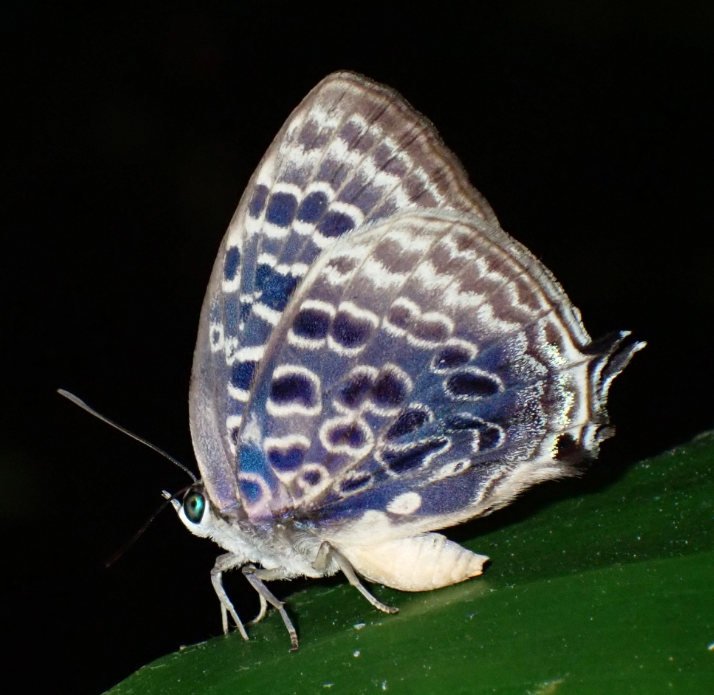
Live butterfly

Above light silvery blue, forewing with a blackish margin, but less darkened in the costal area, otherwise quite similar to anthore. The Aru-form exhibits the metallic blue reflection, which in specimens from Amboina is very extensive, in the anal part of the hindwing reduced to 2 small crescentiform spots; this is anthelius Stgr. [now subspecies] (148 b as helius). — minetta Btlr.[now subspecies] shows the whole under surface of a paler colouring; it represents the species in the Duke of York Island, but it also occurs in New Guinea and New Britain. — The great number of synonyms is probably due to the fact that this otherwise very constant species was mistaken owing to Cramer's wrong statement of its patria ("Surinam") and Linne's brief description. — potidaea Fruhst. [now synonym of A. t. anthore ] is distinguished from Amboina-specimens and from anthore in the male nearly only by its smaller size, whereas the female has a narrower black margin which on the forewing leaves yet free three blue spots behind the cell, whilst on the hindwing it does not extend at all beyond the region at the costal angle. Island of Obi. — latimarginata Strd.[ synonym of A. t. phryxus Boisduval, 1832 ], from German New Guinea, on the contrary exhibits an especially very broad black distal margin, but it is still excelled in this respect by teuthrone Fruhst.[synonym of A. t. phryxus] from Dutch New Guinea (Island River); the latter form besides shows a somewhat darker blue. — zelea Fruhst. [synonym of A. t. phryxus] exhibits the ring-markings in the disc of the hindwing beneath not so distinct as our figure of anthelius ("helius"); the metallic blue of the anal region is more faded, but more extensive, about as much as in the typical form thamyras-, from the Entrecasteaux Is. — calaureia Fruhst.[synonym of A. t. anthelius] from Mysole, approximates again anthelius, but the ring-marking beneath is not so distinctly marked as in Amboina-specimens, though not so faded as in the race from Waigeu, which was denominated phryxus Bsd. and in which the single spots are sometimes quite confluent (the latter form phryxus ab. interniplaga Strd.). — This species is one of the most common in its range, where it occurs in nearly all the islands. But it is to be doubted whether the insular races may be separated from each other as has been tried. The Island of New Guinea alone probably produces different forms which partly form transitions to the neighbouring races.

== Subspecies ==
- A. t. thamyras (Buru, Ambon, Serang. New Guinea)
- A. t. phryxus Boisduval, 1832 (Waigeu - Solomons, New Guinea)
- A. t. minnetta (Butler, 1882) (Bismarck Archipelago)
- A. t. anthore (Hewitson, 1862) (Obi, Bachan, Halmahera, Ternate)
- A. t. anthelius (Staudinger, 1888) (Kai, Aru, Misool, New Guinea)
