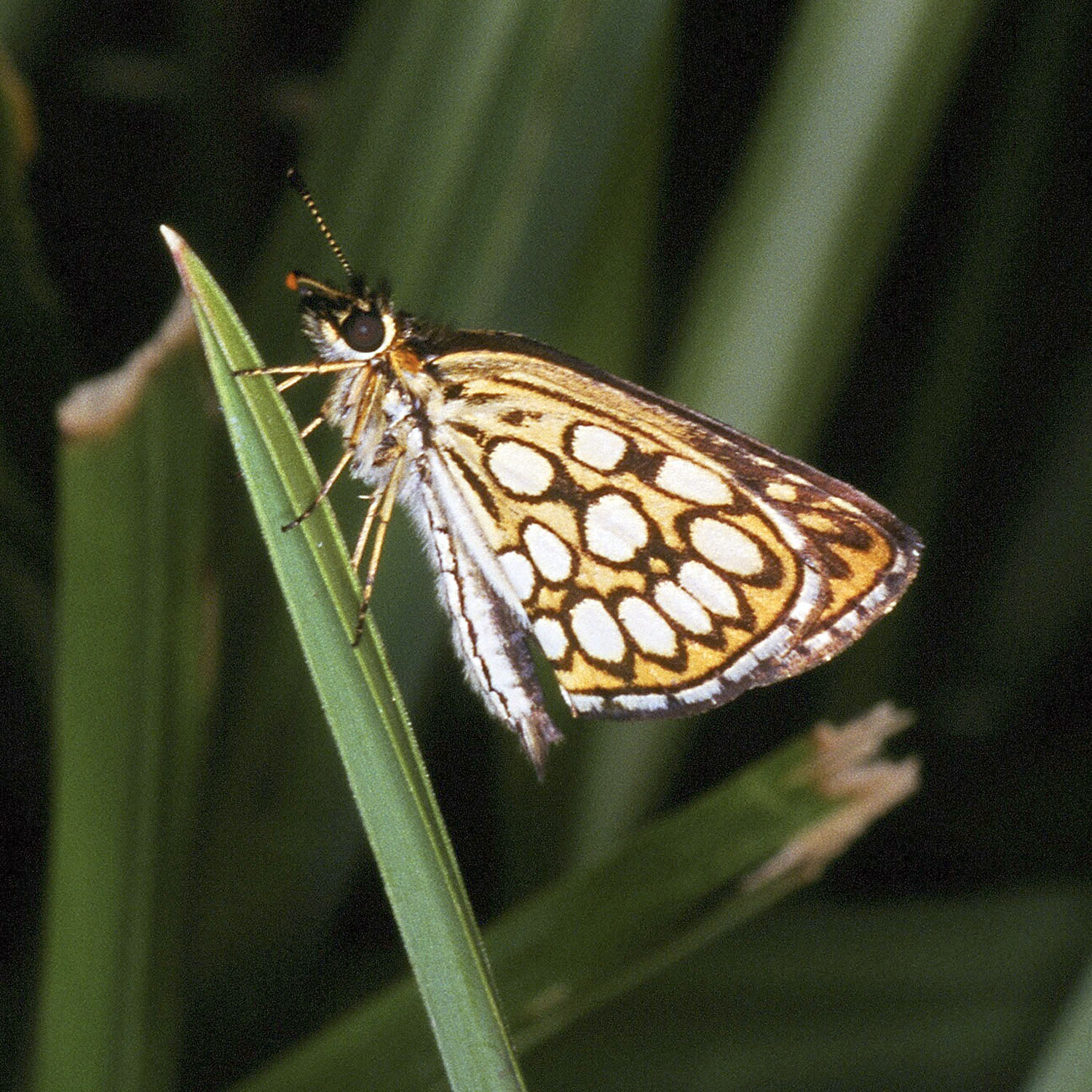
- Large chequered skipper, Heteropterus morpheus

Scientific classification
- Kingdom: Animalia
- Phylum: Arthropoda
- Class: Insecta
- Order: Lepidoptera
- Family: Hesperiidae
- Subfamily: Heteropterinae; Aurivillius, 1925

Genera
- See text

= Skipperling =

Skipperlings

Subfamily of butterflies

Skipperlings are butterflies in the subfamily Heteropterinae. With about 150 described species, this is one of several smaller skipper butterfly subfamilies.

== Genera ==
The subfamily includes the following genera:

- Apostictopterus Leech, 1893
- Argopteron Watson, 1893
- Barca de Nicéville, 1902
- Butleria Kirby, 1871
- Carterocephalus Lederer, 1852
- Dalla Mabille, 1904
- Dardarina Evans, 1937
- Freemaniana Warren, 2001
- Heteropterus Duméril, 1806
- Hovala Evans, 1937
- Ladda Grishin, 2019
- Lepella Evans, 1937
- Leptalina Mabille, 1904
- Metisella Hemming, 1934
- Piruna Evans, 1955
- Tsitana Evans, 1937
