= William Harry Evans =

British entomologist

- Born: 22 July 1876; Shillong
- Died: 13 November 1956 (aged 80); Church Whitfield
- Education: King's School, Canterbury
- Known for: Lycaenidae, Hesperiidae of South Asia
- Scientific career
- Fields: Lepidopterist, soldier

Brigadier William Harry Evans CSI CIE DSO (born 22 July 1876 in Shillong – died 13 November 1956, Church Whitfield ) was a lepidopterist and British Army officer who served in India. He documented the butterfly fauna of India, Burma and Ceylon in a series of articles in the Journal of the Bombay Natural History Society. Brigadier Evans was especially interested in the taxonomy and systematics of the butterfly families Lycaenidae and Hesperiidae an example being his A revision of the Arhopala group of Oriental Lycaenidae (Lepidoptera: Rhopalocera) Bull. British Mus. (Nat. Hist.), Ent., vol. 5: pp. 85–141 (1957).

== Life and work ==
Evans was the third son of Sir Horace Moule Evans and Elizabeth Anne, daughter of Surgeon General J. T. Tressider. His mother kindled an interest in nature and, when he was sent to King's School, Canterbury, he was already interested in butterflies and moths. He attended Royal Military Academy, Woolwich in 1894 and was commissioned in the army at the age of 20. During his time at the Academy, he injured his knee, which reduced his mobility in later life. Evans was trained at the Royal School of Military Engineering in Chatham in preparation for joining the Royal Engineers.

In 1898 he was posted to India and began collecting butterflies in Chitral. He was sent on duty with the Dervish War Expedition (1902–04) and was made an intelligence officer in August 1903. He served in France from 1914 to 1918 and was awarded the D.S.O. and a brevet. Exposure to poison gas, however, caused him permanent chest problems. He returned to India in 1919 with his final post in the Western Command at Quetta as a chief engineer.

He retired in 1931 and travelled to London via Australia. His home was close to the Natural History Museum and he continued to work on Military service and was attached with the Non-Intervention Committee during the Spanish Civil War and later took up work as an Air Raid Warden. He was at a window in the Natural History Museum, facing South onto Cromwell Road when a German V1 flying bomb burst on the road 100 yards (91 m) away. He was injured and his hearing was permanently impaired.

His wife lived in Bournemouth during the air raids (and died there in 1945). Evans, however, stayed in London to complete his Revision of the Hesperiidae of the world, as he stated "before he died".

Evans collected butterflies throughout his career in India and was very knowledgeable on distribution patterns. His favourite collection areas included Kodaikanal, Jabalpur, Simla, Murree, Darjeeling, Chitral and Baluchistan. He travelled to Australia to collect the endemic subfamily Trapezitinae.

From 1923 he published keys to the identification of Indian butterflies in the Journal of the Bombay Natural History Society. Evans examined over half a million specimens of Hesperiidae in the museum.

Evans was influenced by the works of Bernhard Rensch, Ernst Mayr and Thomas Huxley, but he was not comfortable with the ideas of phylogenetic classification.

He suffered from ill health in his final years, as an after effect of the poison gas he inhaled in the first world war. A bout of pneumonia in 1952 led to partial heart failure and a subsequent heart attack in 1954. He died of heart failure in his sleep on 13 November 1956.

== Publications ==
- 1937. A Catalogue of the African Hesperiidae. British Museum (Natural History), London.
- 1949. A Catalogue of the Hesperiidae From Europe, Asia, and Australia in the British Museum (Natural History).
- 1951. A Catalogue of the American Hesperiidae Indicating the Classification and Nomenclature Adopted in the British Museum (Natural History). Part I. Pyrrhophyginae. British Museum, London.
- 1952. A Catalogue of the American Hesperiidae Indicating the Classification and Nomenclature Adopted in the British Museum (Natural History). Part II. Pyrginae. Section I. British Museum, London.
- 1953. A Catalogue of the American Hesperiidae Indicating the Classification and Nomenclature Adopted in the British Museum (Natural History). Part III. Pyrginae. Section II. British Museum, London.
- 1955. A Catalogue of the American Hesperiidae Indicating the Classification and Nomenclature Adopted in the British Museum (Natural History). Part IV. Hesperiinae and Megathyminae. British Museum, London.
- 1932. The Identification of Indian Butterflies.
