= Checkered skipper =

Checkered skipper, checkered-skipper, or chequered skipper may refer to a variety of butterflies in the family Hesperiidae:

- Carterocephalus, a Holarctic genus of subfamily Heteropterinae that may be known as "chequered skippers" in Europe
  - Carterocephalus palaemon, a species commonly known as just "checquered skipper" in Europe
- Large chequered skipper, a Palearctic species
- Pyrgus, a genus of subfamily Pyrginae, some species of which are known as "checkered" or "chequered skippers" in North America
  - Burnsius, a genus formerly included in Pyrgus that also includes many species known as "checkered skippers" in North America
- Kedestes lepenula, an African species commonly known as just "chequered skipper"
