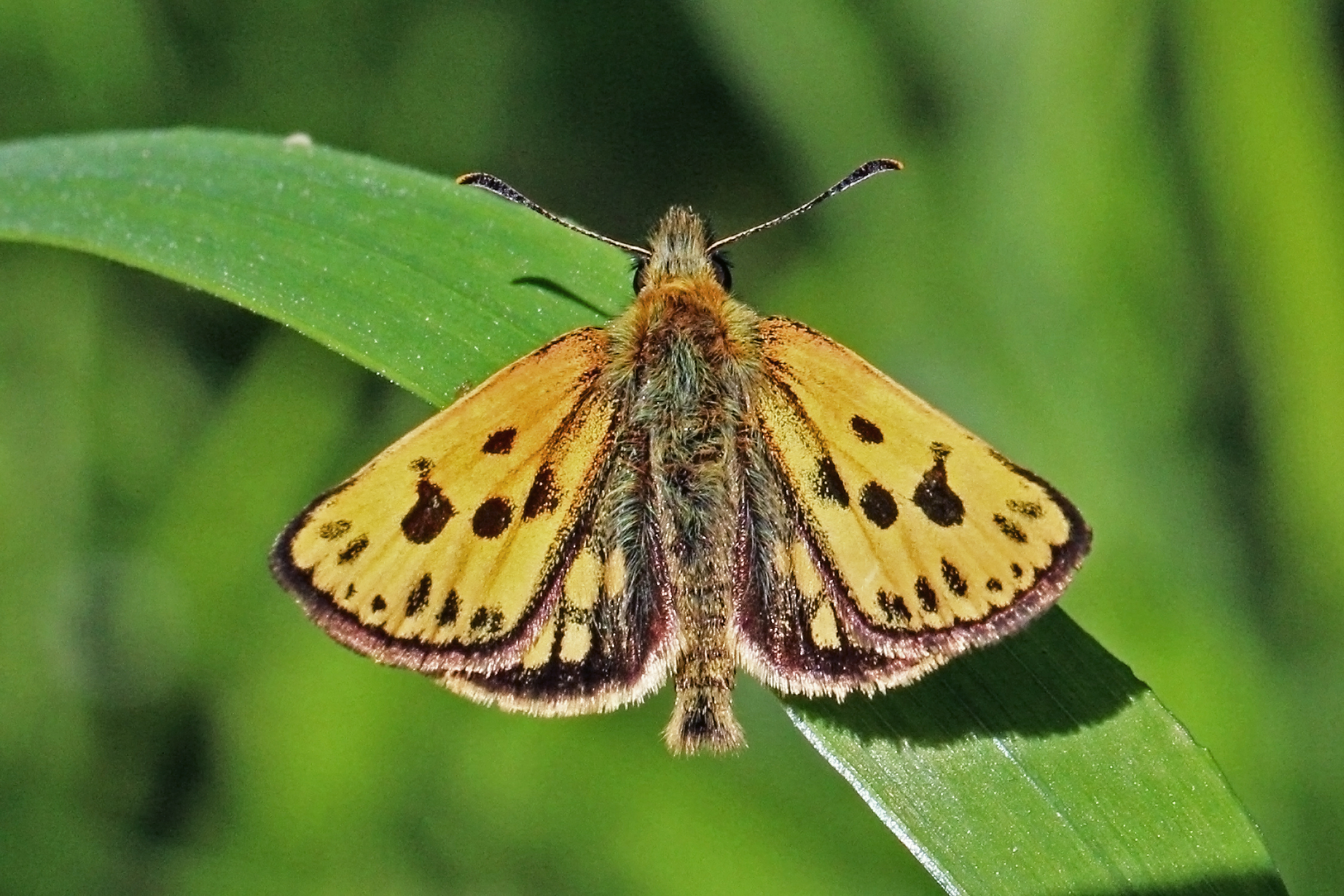
- male
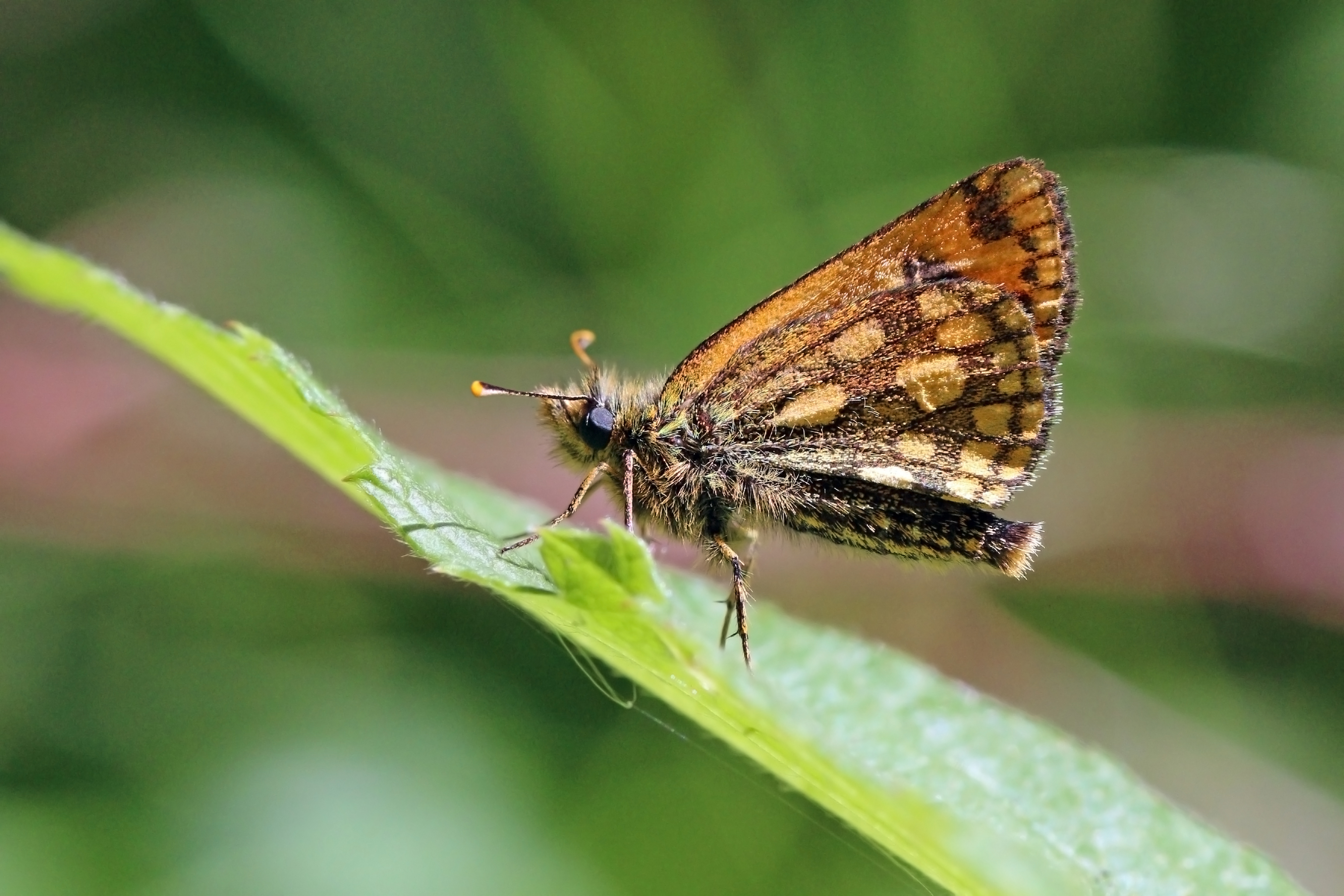
- both in Estonia

Scientific classification
- Kingdom: Animalia
- Phylum: Arthropoda
- Class: Insecta
- Order: Lepidoptera
- Family: Hesperiidae
- Genus: Carterocephalus
- Species: C. silvicola

Binomial name
- Carterocephalus silvicola Meigen, 1829

Synonyms
- Carterocephalus silvicolus (Meigen, 1771); Carterocephalus silvius (Knoch, 1781)

= Carterocephalus silvicola =

Species of butterfly

Carterocephalus silvicola, the northern chequered skipper, is a species of butterfly of the family Hesperiidae. It is found in northern Europe and the northern and eastern Palearctic.

== Description ==
The front wing length is twelve to 13 millimeters. The upper surface of the forewings is light yellow with large brown-black discal and small submarginal spots. The hindwings are basically brown-black in color with yellow spots arranged as in Carterocephalus palaemon and with an additional spot on the costa . The bottom is the same as the top. The female has slightly larger spots as well as a dark basal region and a dark outer edge.

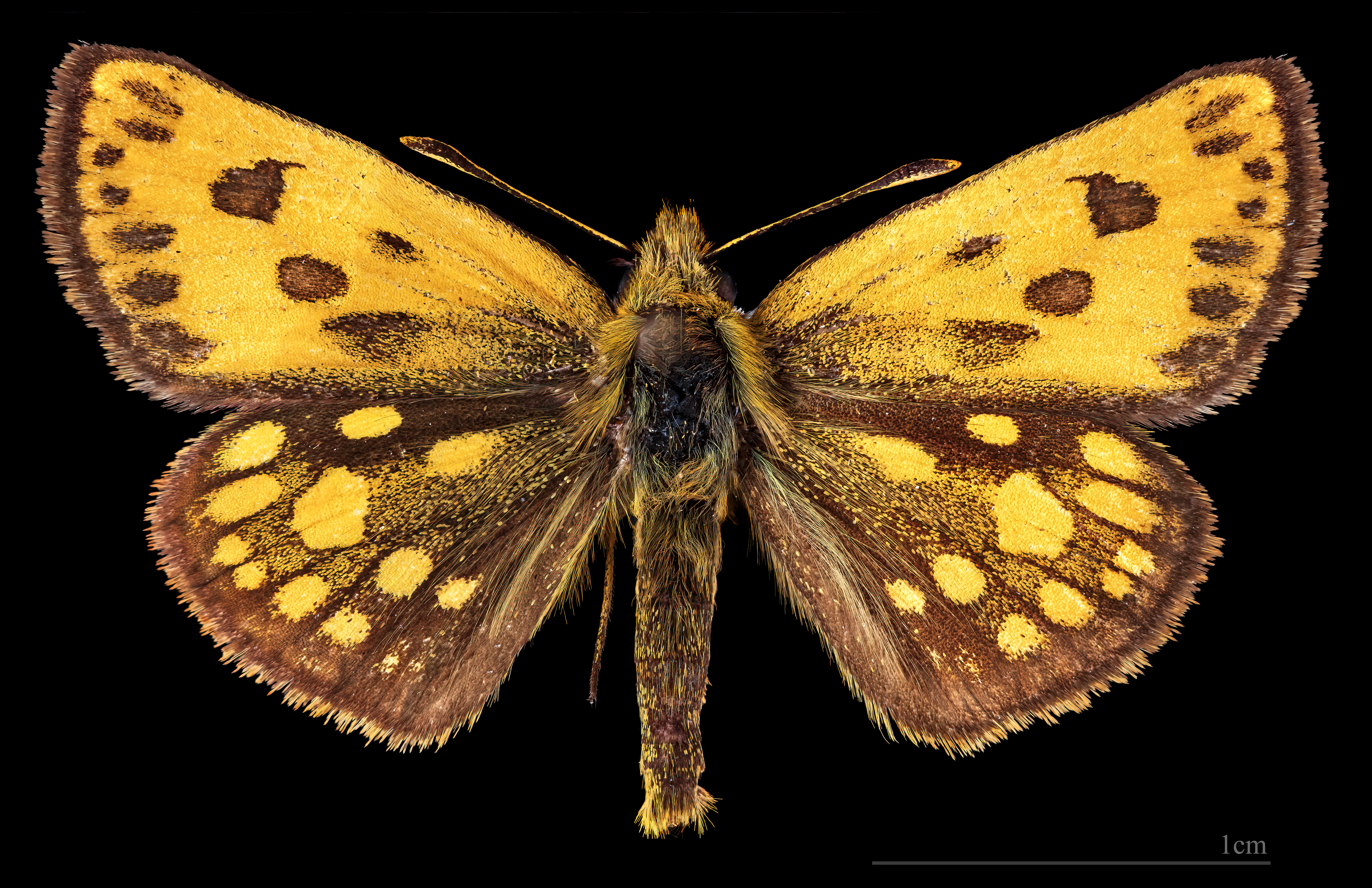
Carterocephalus silvicola ♂

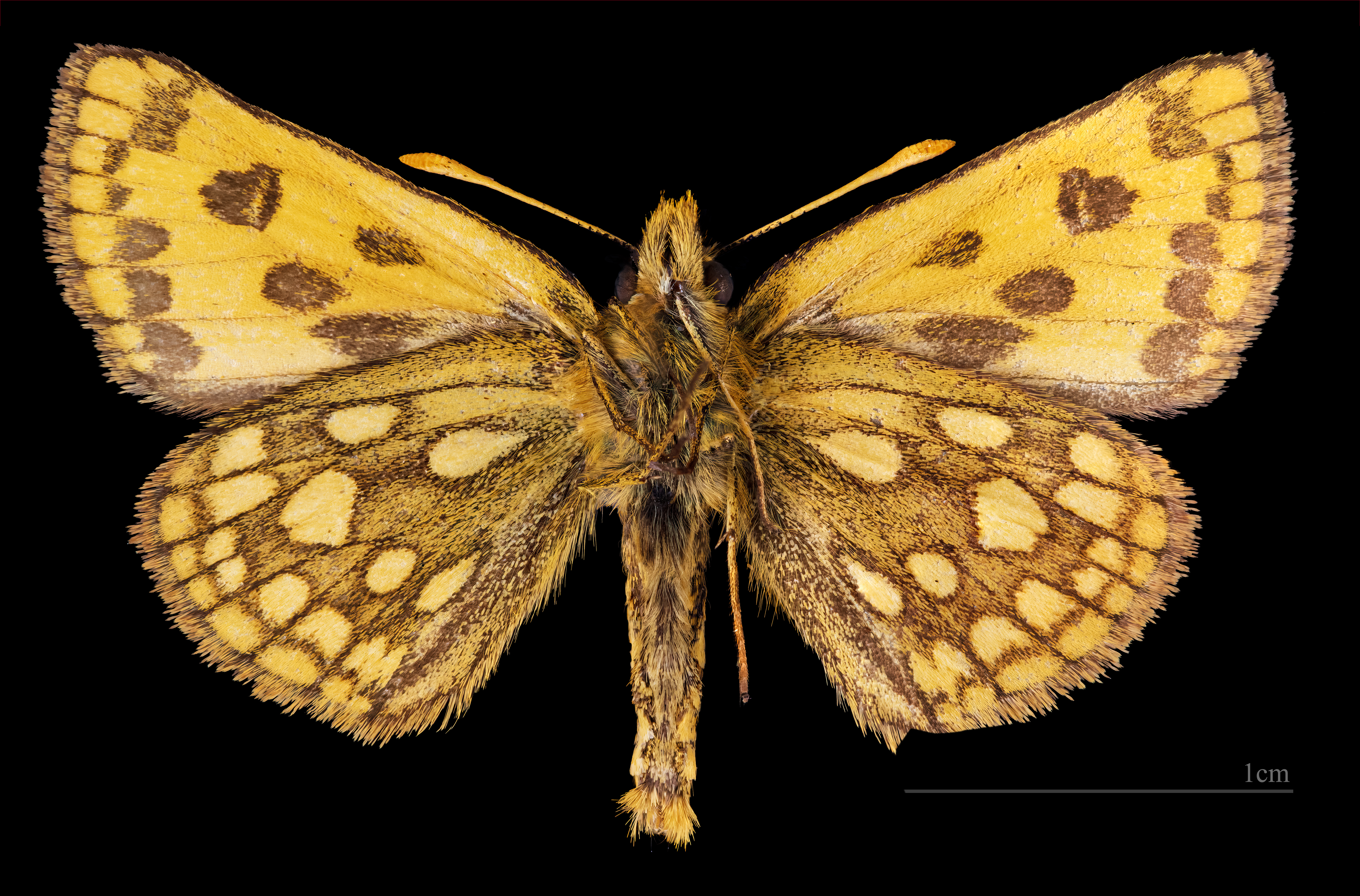
♂ △

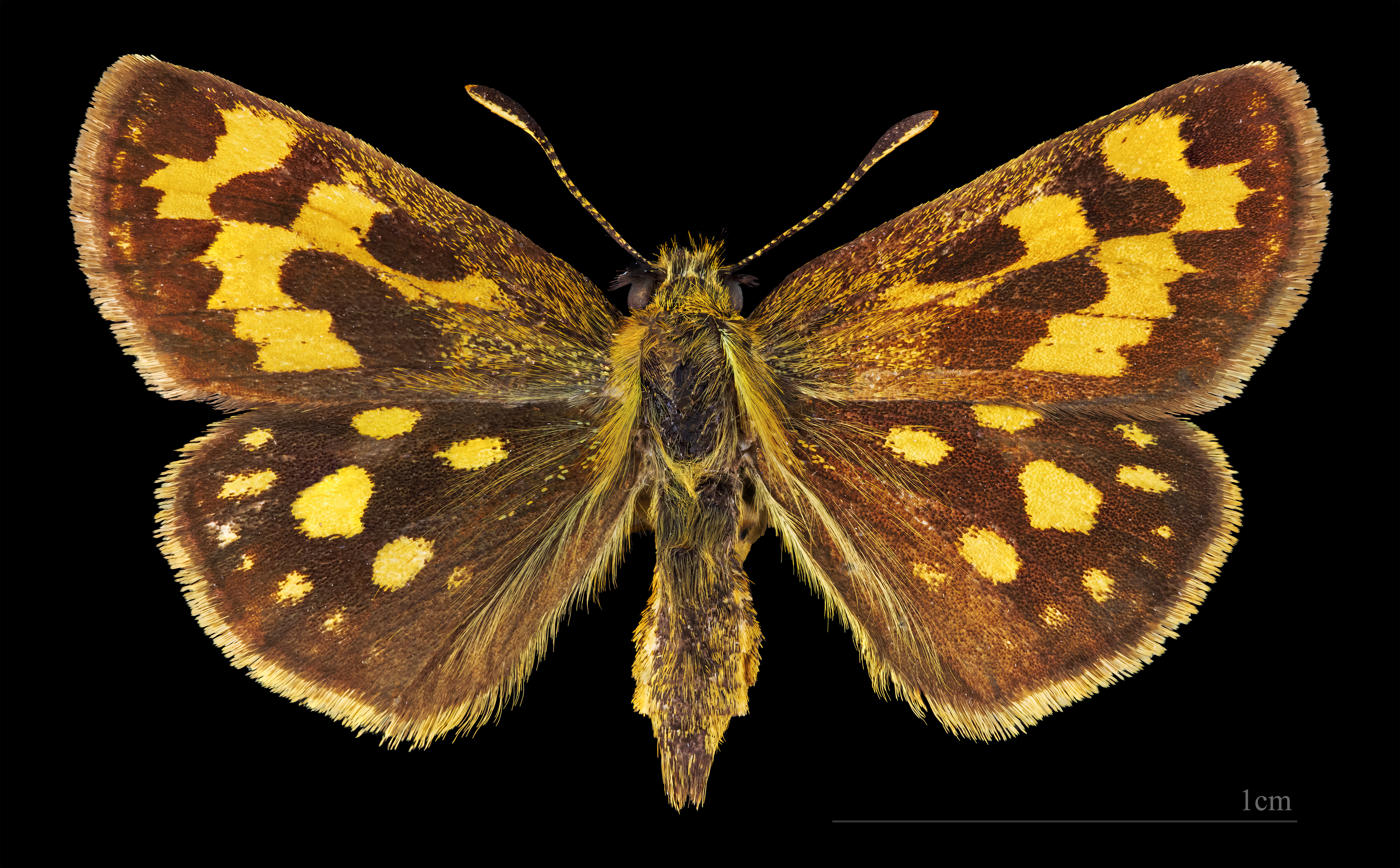
♀

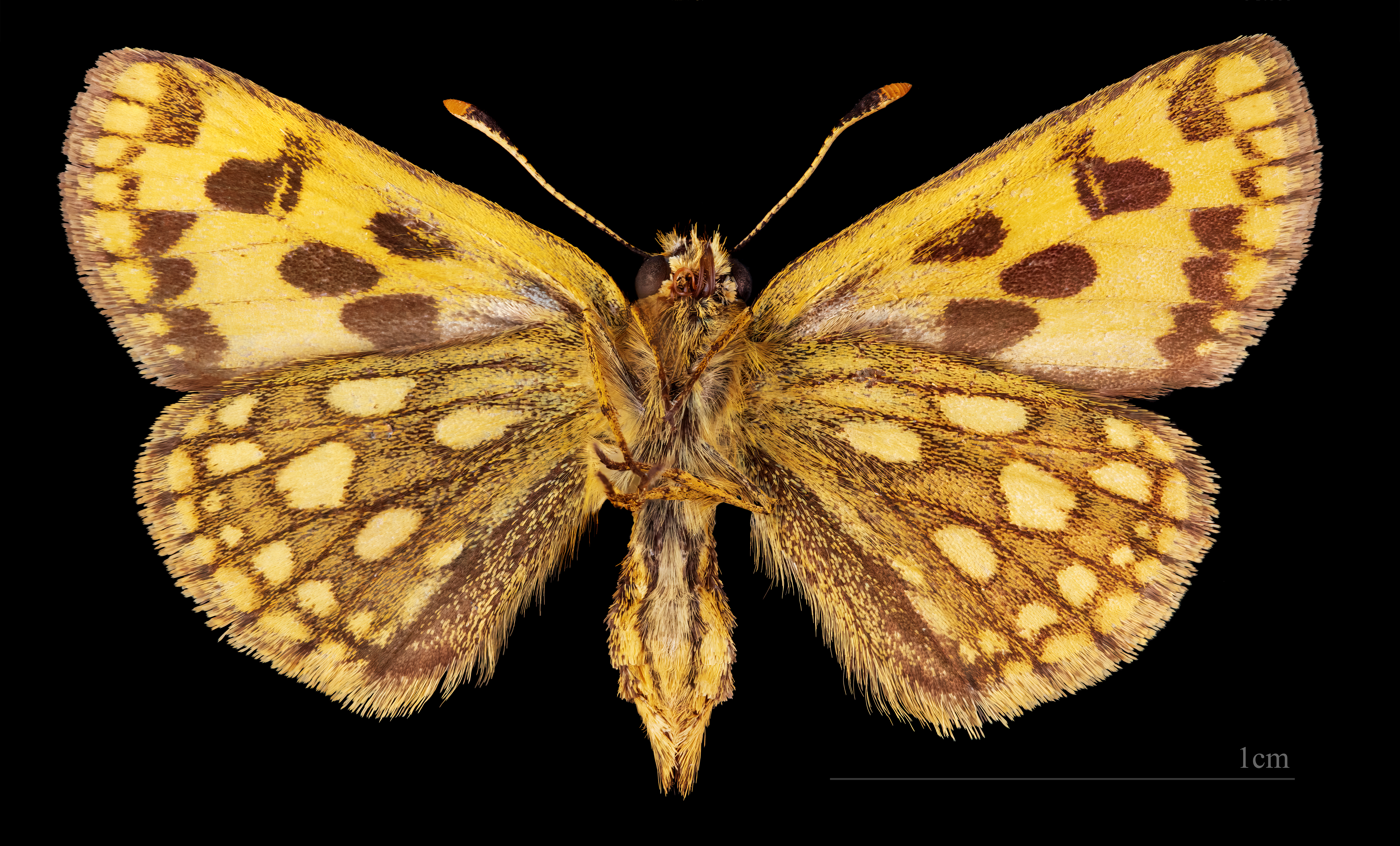
♀ △

The caterpillars are grass green when mature with pale dorsal and lateral dorsal lines. They grow up to about 25 millimeters long. Before hibernating, the caterpillars turn gray-yellow. They overwinter as adult caterpillars.

The pupa is pale yellow with brown vertical stripes

== Biology ==
The butterfly flies from May to June depending on the location.

The larvae feed on various grasses.
