= Ochrota unicolor =

Scientific classification
- Domain: Eukaryota
- Kingdom: Animalia
- Phylum: Arthropoda
- Class: Insecta
- Order: Lepidoptera
- Superfamily: Noctuoidea
- Family: Erebidae
- Subfamily: Arctiinae
- Genus: Ochrota
- Species: O. unicolor

Binomial name
- Ochrota unicolor (Hopffer, 1857)

Synonyms
- Crocota unicolor Hopffer, 1857; Bettonia ferruginea Butler, 1898; Setina imminuta Saalmüller, 1880; Setina innominata Saalmüller, 1880; Setina quadripunctata Walker, 1865; Megacraspedum quinquepunctatum Mabille, 1900; Lithosia rubriceps Rogenhofer, 1891; Philenora unicolor ab. somalensis Strand, 1922; Philenora unicolor ab. subapicalipicta Strand, 1922; Philenora unicolor ab. subapicalipunctis Strand, 1922

Species of moth

Ochrota unicolor is a moth of the subfamily Arctiinae. It was described by Carl Heinrich Hopffer in 1857. It is found in Ethiopia, Kenya, Madagascar, Mozambique, Somalia, South Africa, Zambia and Zimbabwe.
