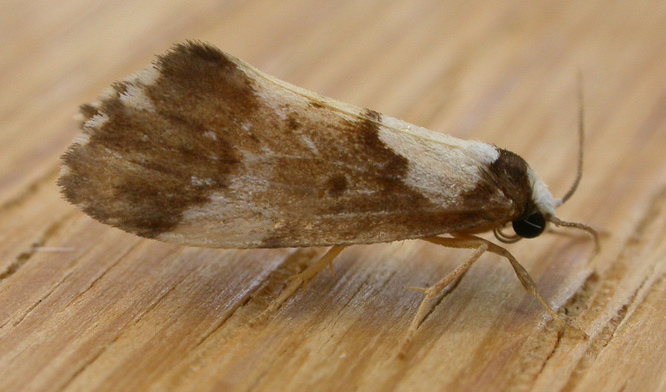
- Philenora elegans

Scientific classification
- Domain: Eukaryota
- Kingdom: Animalia
- Phylum: Arthropoda
- Class: Insecta
- Order: Lepidoptera
- Superfamily: Noctuoidea
- Family: Erebidae
- Subfamily: Arctiinae
- Tribe: Lithosiini
- Genus: Philenora; Rosenstock, 1885

Synonyms
- Scaeodora Meyrick, 1886

= Philenora =

Genus of moths

Philenora is a genus of moths in the subfamily Arctiinae. The genus was erected by Rudolph Rosenstock in 1885.

== Species ==
- Philenora aroa Bethune-Baker, 1904
- Philenora aspectalella Walker, 1864
- Philenora brunneata Daniel, 1965
- Philenora cataplex Turner, 1940
- Philenora chionastis Meyrick, 1886
- Philenora elegans Butler, 1877
- Philenora irregularis (Lucas, 1890)
- Philenora latifasciata Inoue & Kobayashi, 1963
- Philenora lunata (Lucas, 1890)
- Philenora malthaca Turner, 1944
- Philenora nudaridia Hampson, 1900
- Philenora omophanes Meyrick, 1886
- Philenora placochrysa Turner, 1899
- Philenora pteridopola Turner, 1922
- Philenora tenuilinea Hampson, 1914
- Philenora undulosa Walker, 1857

== Taxonomy ==
Ochrota is treated as a synonym of Philenora by some sources.
