= Philenora tenuilinea =

Scientific classification
- Kingdom: Animalia
- Phylum: Arthropoda
- Class: Insecta
- Order: Lepidoptera
- Superfamily: Noctuoidea
- Family: Erebidae
- Subfamily: Arctiinae
- Genus: Philenora
- Species: P. tenuilinea

Binomial name
- Philenora tenuilinea Hampson, 1914

Species of moth

Philenora tenuilinea is a moth in the subfamily Arctiinae. It was described by George Hampson in 1914. It is found in Taiwan.
