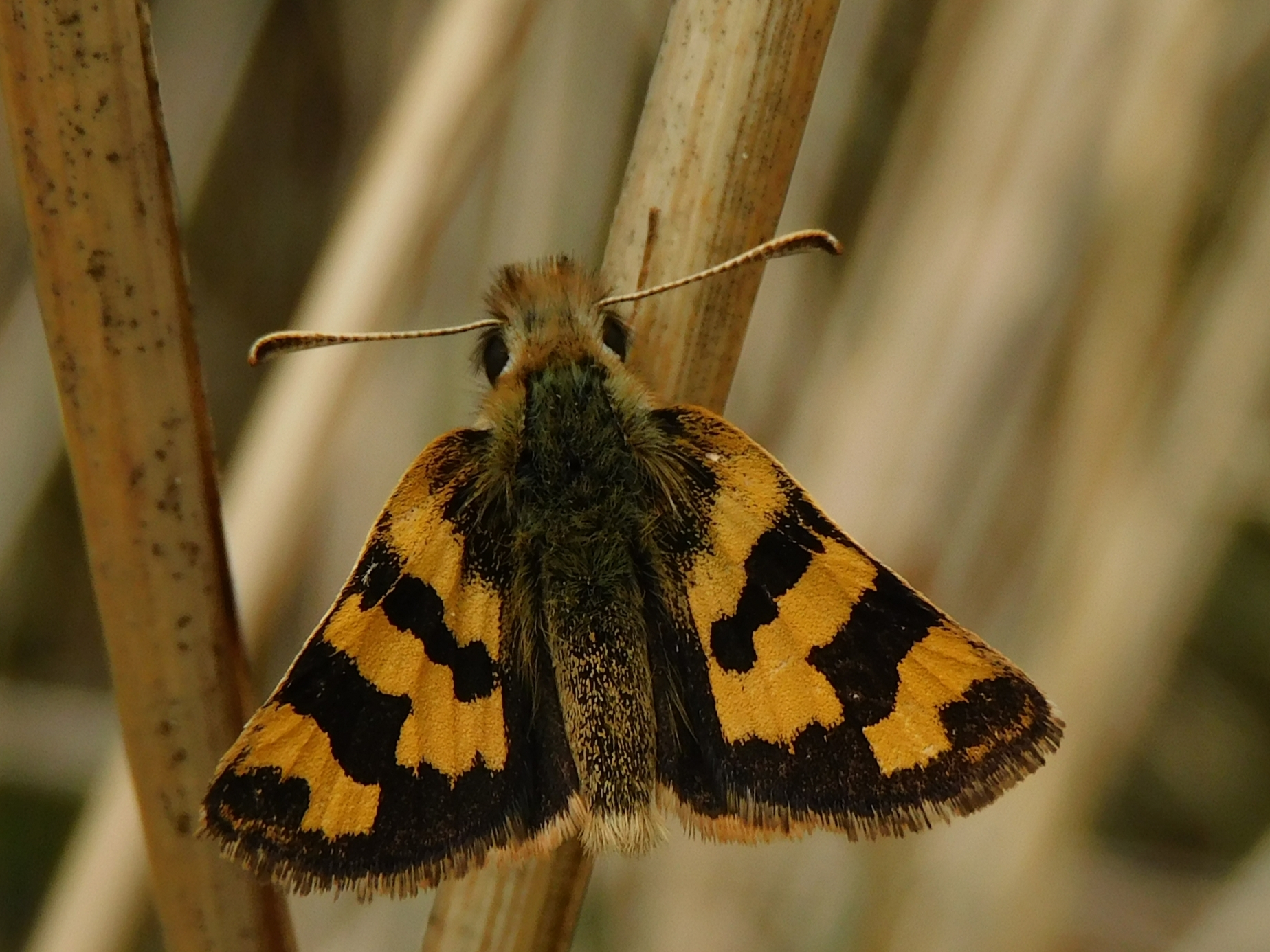
- Upperside
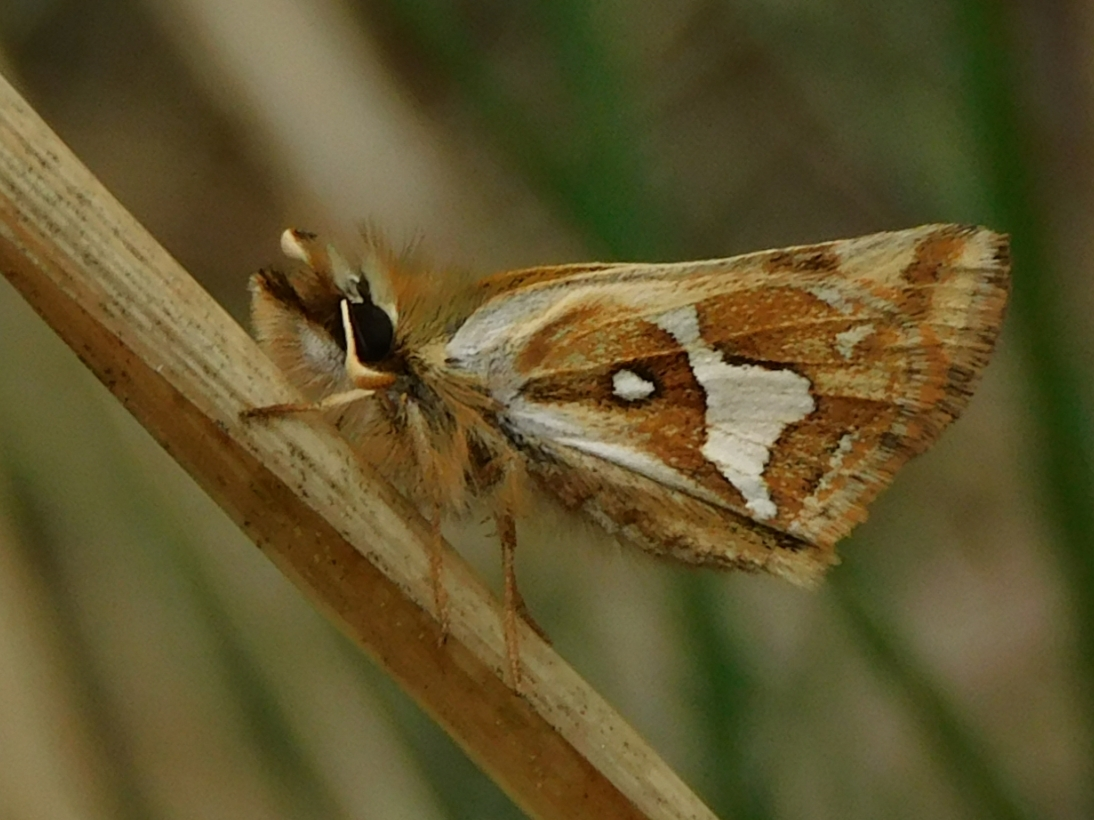
- Underside

Scientific classification
- Kingdom: Animalia
- Phylum: Arthropoda
- Class: Insecta
- Order: Lepidoptera
- Family: Hesperiidae
- Genus: Carterocephalus
- Species: C. avanti

Binomial name
- Carterocephalus avanti (de Nicéville, 1886)

Synonyms
- Pamphila avanti

= Carterocephalus avanti =

Species of butterfly

Carterocephalus avanti, also known as the orange-and-silver hopper, is a butterfly in the family Hesperiidae. It is found from Uttarakhand to Tibet. It was described by Lionel de Nicéville in 1886.

== Description ==
The upperside is fuscous with many streaks on it, all yellow. The forewing cillia are very long and are brown in colour while the hindwing cilia are yellow in colour. The underside is a paler ferruginous-ochreous colour. The underside forewing is similar to the upperside forewing, but the markings are extended. The underside hindwing has a very large and silvery discal spot.

== Subspecies ==
There are three recognized subspecies -

- Carterocephalus avanti avanti (de Nicéville, 1886) - Uttarakhand to Sikkim
- Carterocephalus avanti flavostigma (Oberthür, 1908) - Tibet
- Carterocephalus avanti ensis (Evans, 1939) - Yunnan
