= Ochrota asuraeformis =

Scientific classification
- Kingdom: Animalia
- Phylum: Arthropoda
- Class: Insecta
- Order: Lepidoptera
- Superfamily: Noctuoidea
- Family: Erebidae
- Subfamily: Arctiinae
- Genus: Ochrota
- Species: O. asuraeformis

Binomial name
- Ochrota asuraeformis (Strand, 1912)

Synonyms
- Philenora asuraeformis Strand, 1912

Species of moth

Ochrota asuraeformis is a moth of the subfamily Arctiinae. It was described by Strand in 1912. It is found in Tanzania.
