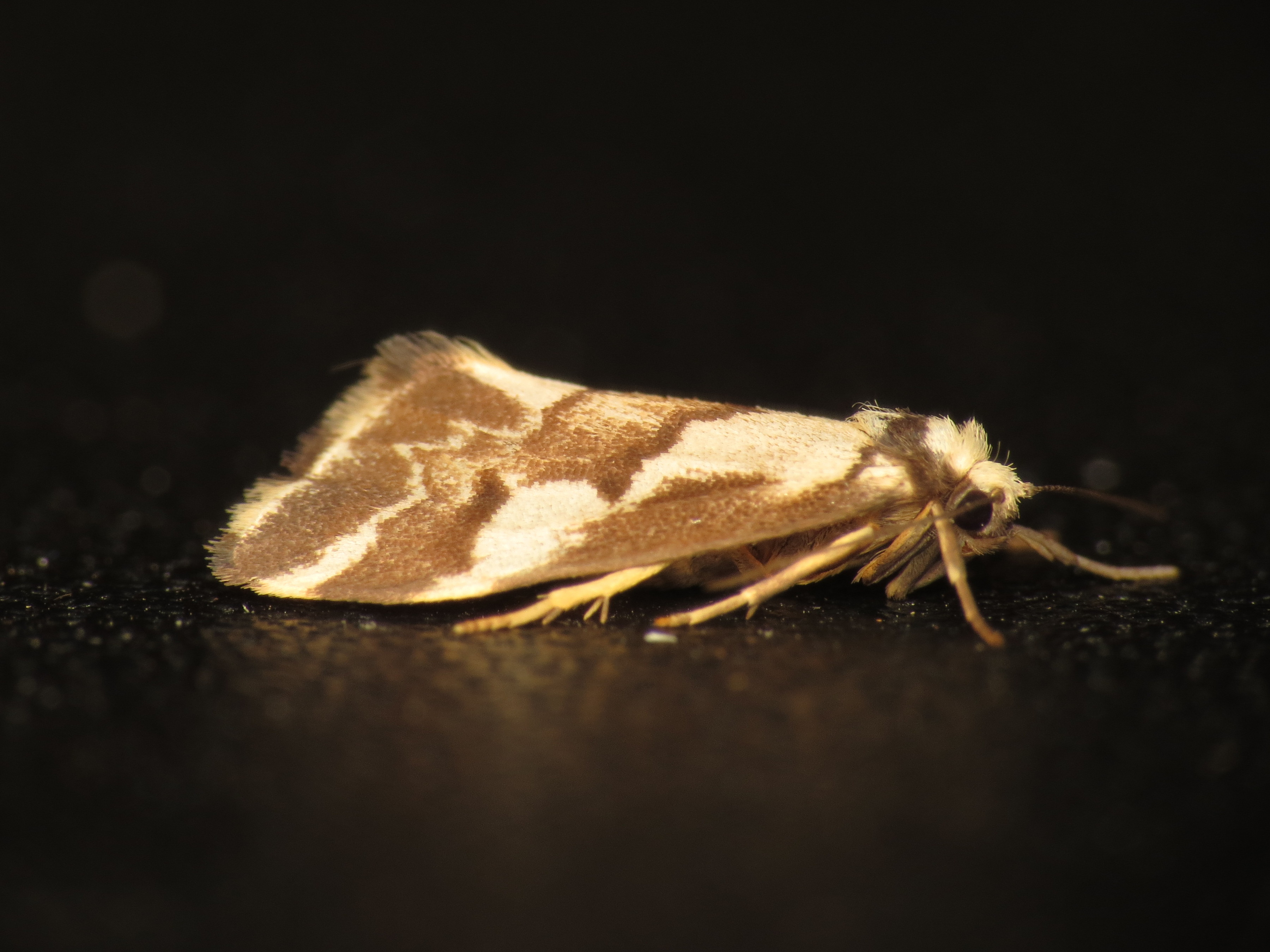

Scientific classification
- Kingdom: Animalia
- Phylum: Arthropoda
- Class: Insecta
- Order: Lepidoptera
- Superfamily: Noctuoidea
- Family: Erebidae
- Subfamily: Arctiinae
- Genus: Philenora
- Species: P. chionastis

Binomial name
- Philenora chionastis (Meyrick, 1886)

Synonyms
- Scaeodora chionastis Meyrick, 1886; Comarchis obliquata T. P. Lucas, 1890

= Philenora chionastis =

Species of moth

Philenora chionastis is a moth in the subfamily Arctiinae. It was described by Edward Meyrick in 1886. It is found in the Australian states of Queensland and New South Wales.
