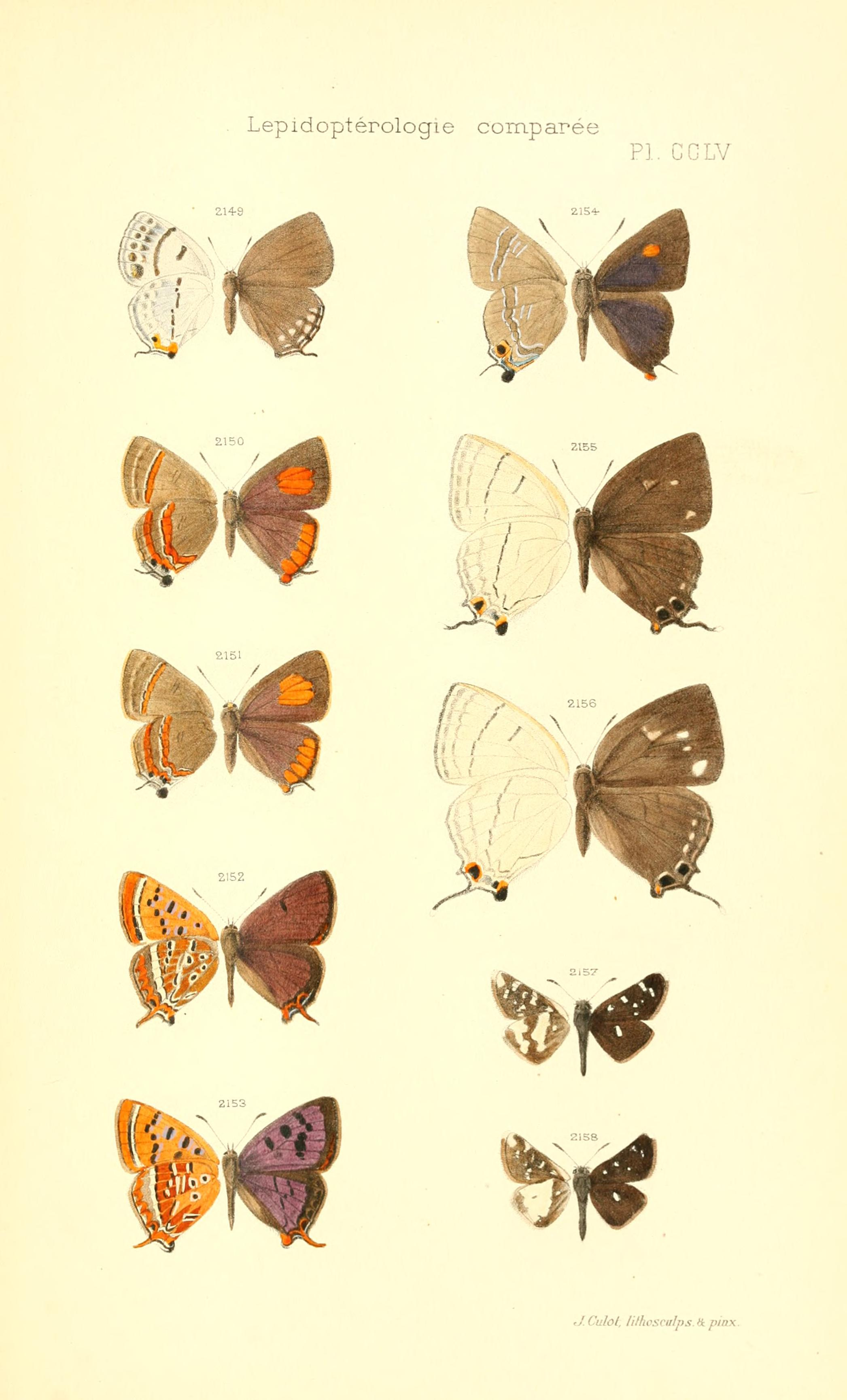
- Carterocephalus dieckmanni gemmatus Leech, 1891 in Oberthür, 1914 Études Lépidopterologie Comparée

Scientific classification
- Kingdom: Animalia
- Phylum: Arthropoda
- Class: Insecta
- Order: Lepidoptera
- Family: Hesperiidae
- Genus: Carterocephalus
- Species: C. dieckmanni

Binomial name
- Carterocephalus dieckmanni Graesser, 1888

Synonyms
- Carterocephalus gemmatus Leech, 1891; Carterocephalus demea Oberthür, 1891

= Carterocephalus dieckmanni =

Species of butterfly

Carterocephalus dieckmanni is a species of butterfly found in the East Palearctic (Northeast China, Amur, Ussuri, North Burma) that belongs to the skippers family.

== Description from Seitz ==
P. dieckmanni Graes. (— gemmatus Leech, demea Oberth.) (87 d) Forewing beneath with the spots in cellules 1 a and 2 united with those in cellule 3, forming an uninterrupted median band. Amur, West-China, Tibet.

== Subspecies ==
- Carterocephalus dieckmanni dieckmanni - southern Amur and Ussuri
- Carterocephalus dieckmanni minor Evans, 1932 - China

== See also ==
- List of butterflies of Russia
