= Philenora omophanes =

Scientific classification
- Kingdom: Animalia
- Phylum: Arthropoda
- Class: Insecta
- Order: Lepidoptera
- Superfamily: Noctuoidea
- Family: Erebidae
- Subfamily: Arctiinae
- Genus: Philenora
- Species: P. omophanes

Binomial name
- Philenora omophanes (Meyrick, 1886)

Synonyms
- Scaeodora omophanes Meyrick, 1886

Species of moth

Philenora omophanes, the delicate philenora, is a moth in the subfamily Arctiinae. It was described by Edward Meyrick in 1886. It is found in the Australian states of New South Wales and Victoria.
