= Philenora placochrysa =

Scientific classification
- Domain: Eukaryota
- Kingdom: Animalia
- Phylum: Arthropoda
- Class: Insecta
- Order: Lepidoptera
- Superfamily: Noctuoidea
- Family: Erebidae
- Subfamily: Arctiinae
- Genus: Philenora
- Species: P. placochrysa

Binomial name
- Philenora placochrysa (Turner, 1899)

Synonyms
- Scaeodora placochrysa Turner, 1899

Species of moth

Philenora placochrysa is a moth in the subfamily Arctiinae. It was described by Turner in 1899. It is found in Queensland, Australia.
