= Philenora nudaridia =

Scientific classification
- Kingdom: Animalia
- Phylum: Arthropoda
- Class: Insecta
- Order: Lepidoptera
- Superfamily: Noctuoidea
- Family: Erebidae
- Subfamily: Arctiinae
- Genus: Philenora
- Species: P. nudaridia

Binomial name
- Philenora nudaridia Hampson, 1900

Species of moth

Philenora nudaridia is a moth in the subfamily Arctiinae. It was described by George Hampson in 1900. It is found in the Australian state of Queensland.
