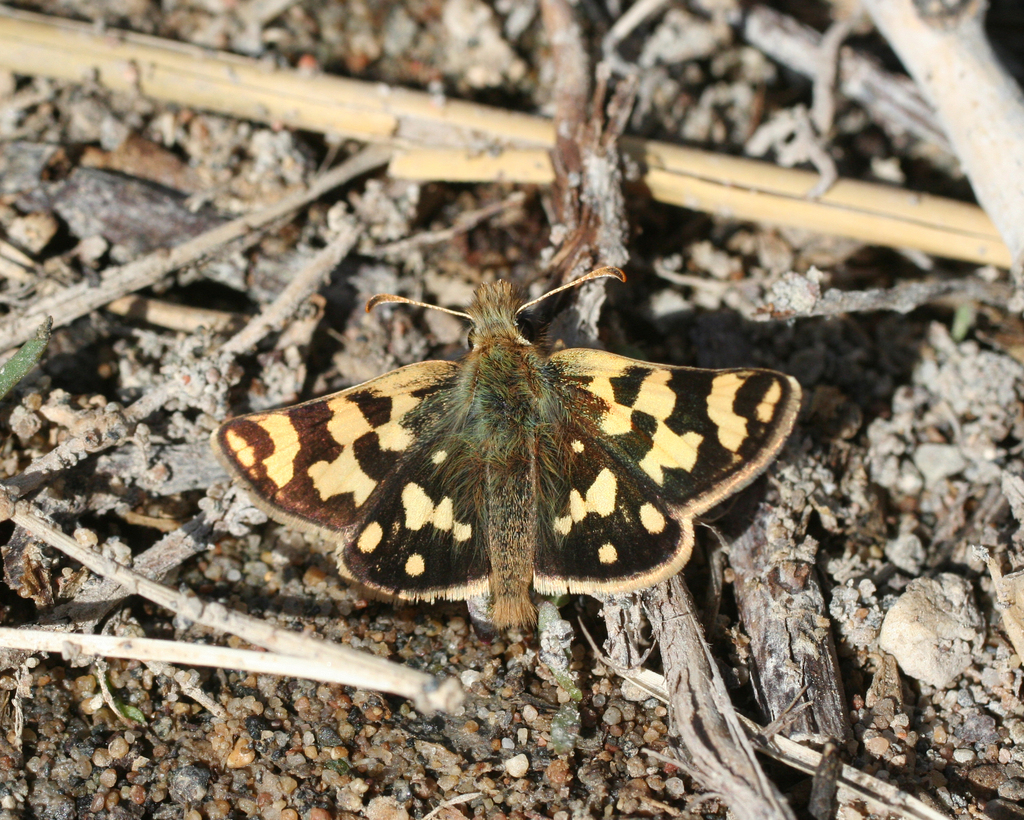

Scientific classification
- Kingdom: Animalia
- Phylum: Arthropoda
- Class: Insecta
- Order: Lepidoptera
- Family: Hesperiidae
- Genus: Carterocephalus
- Species: C. argyrostigma

Binomial name
- Carterocephalus argyrostigma (Eversmann, 1851)

Synonyms
- Hesperia argyrostigma Eversmann, 1851; Cyclopides argenteogutta Butler, 1870

= Carterocephalus argyrostigma =

Species of butterfly

Carterocephalus argyrostigma is a species of butterfly found in the East Palearctic (South Siberia, Mongolia, Northeast China) that belongs to the skippers family.

== Description ==
The wing upperside ground colour is dark-brown with yellow spots; the hind wing underside usually has five brilliant silvery-white spots of complicated shapes.

== Description from Seitz ==
Forewing beneath with a light spot which covers the extreme base of cellule 2, and with another placed towards the centre of the same cellule. Hindwing with a light spot in the centre of cellule 8. The upperside of the wings with yellow or yellowish spot. Altai, Mongolia, Amur. According to Graeser in June.

== See also ==
- List of butterflies of Russia
