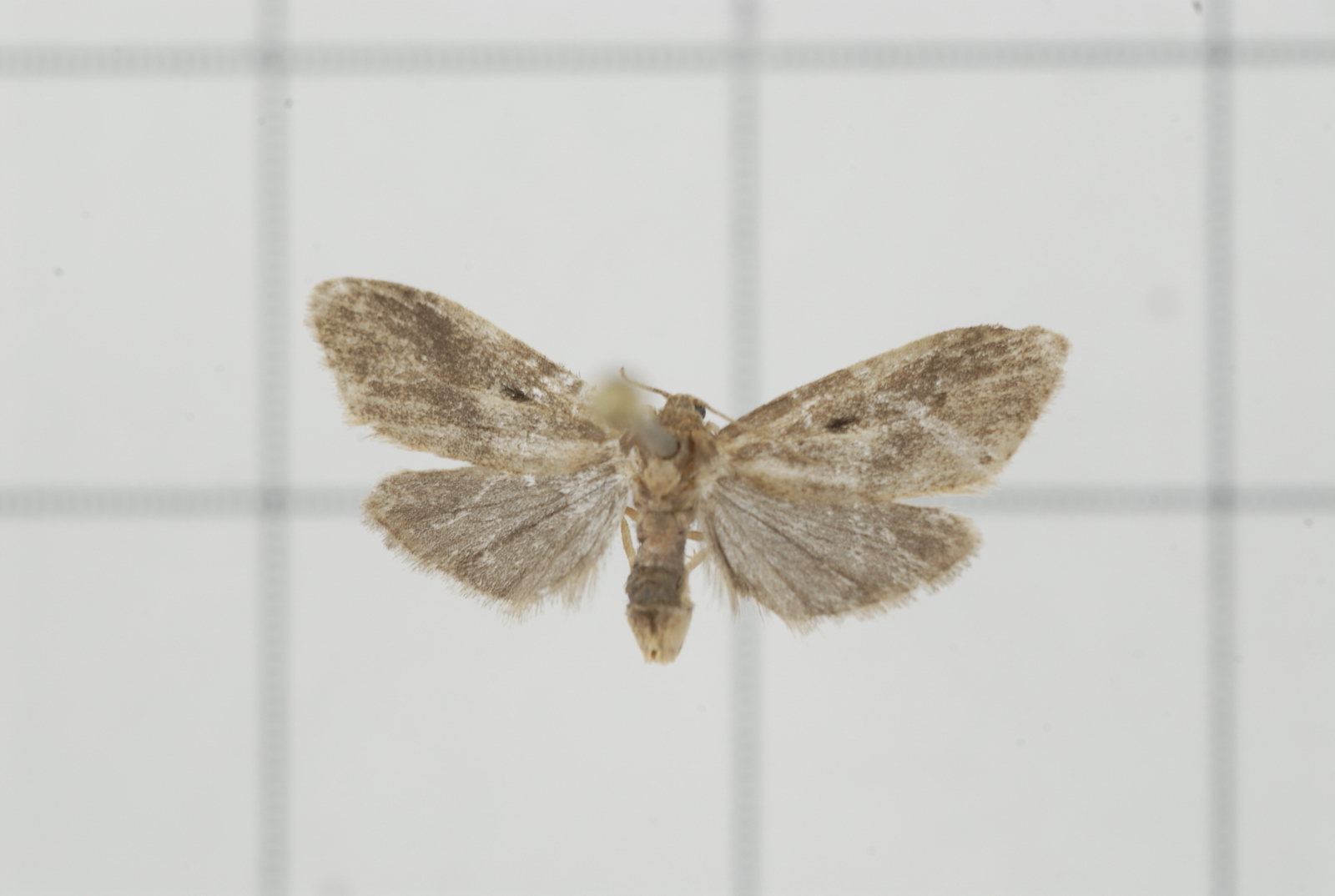

Scientific classification
- Kingdom: Animalia
- Phylum: Arthropoda
- Class: Insecta
- Order: Lepidoptera
- Superfamily: Noctuoidea
- Family: Erebidae
- Subfamily: Arctiinae
- Genus: Philenora
- Species: P. latifasciata

Binomial name
- Philenora latifasciata Inoue & Kobayashi, 1963

= Philenora latifasciata =

Species of moth

Philenora latifasciata is a moth in the subfamily Arctiinae. It was described by Inoue and Kobayashi in 1963. It is found in Japan and Taiwan.
