= Philenora undulosa =

Scientific classification
- Kingdom: Animalia
- Phylum: Arthropoda
- Clade: Pancrustacea
- Class: Insecta
- Order: Lepidoptera
- Superfamily: Noctuoidea
- Family: Erebidae
- Subfamily: Arctiinae
- Genus: Philenora
- Species: P. undulosa

Binomial name
- Philenora undulosa (Walker, 1857)

Synonyms
- Acontia undulosa Walker, [1858]; Termessa lyelliana Lower, 1893

Species of moth

Philenora undulosa is a moth in the subfamily Arctiinae. It was described by Francis Walker in 1857. It is found in Australia (New South Wales, Victoria and Tasmania).
