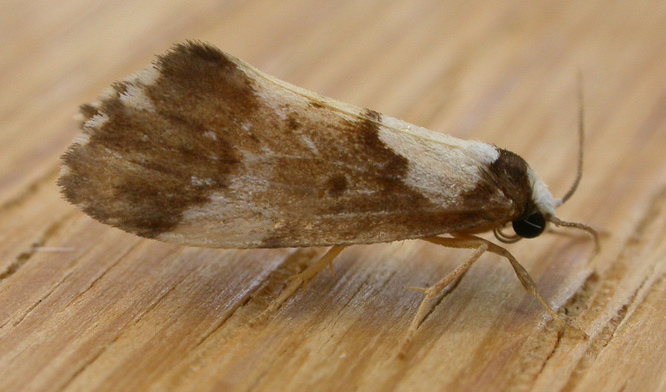

Scientific classification
- Domain: Eukaryota
- Kingdom: Animalia
- Phylum: Arthropoda
- Class: Insecta
- Order: Lepidoptera
- Superfamily: Noctuoidea
- Family: Erebidae
- Subfamily: Arctiinae
- Genus: Philenora
- Species: P. elegans

Binomial name
- Philenora elegans (Butler, 1877)

Synonyms
- Pallene elegans Butler, 1877

= Philenora elegans =

Species of moth

Philenora elegans is a moth of the subfamily Arctiinae first described by Arthur Gardiner Butler in 1877. It is found in Australia.
