= Philenora aroa =

Scientific classification
- Domain: Eukaryota
- Kingdom: Animalia
- Phylum: Arthropoda
- Class: Insecta
- Order: Lepidoptera
- Superfamily: Noctuoidea
- Family: Erebidae
- Subfamily: Arctiinae
- Genus: Philenora
- Species: P. aroa

Binomial name
- Philenora aroa (Bethune-Baker, 1904)

Synonyms
- Schistophleps aroa Bethune-Baker, 1904

Species of moth

Philenora aroa is a moth in the subfamily Arctiinae. It was described by George Thomas Bethune-Baker in 1904. It is found in New Guinea.

The wingspan is 22–24 mm. Its forewings are greyish white, with a dark grey antemedial line and a small dark spot at the end of the cell.

That is followed by an irregular dark postmedial line, with a dark grey suffusion in front of the apex.

The hindwings are uniform greyish white, with a dark termen.
