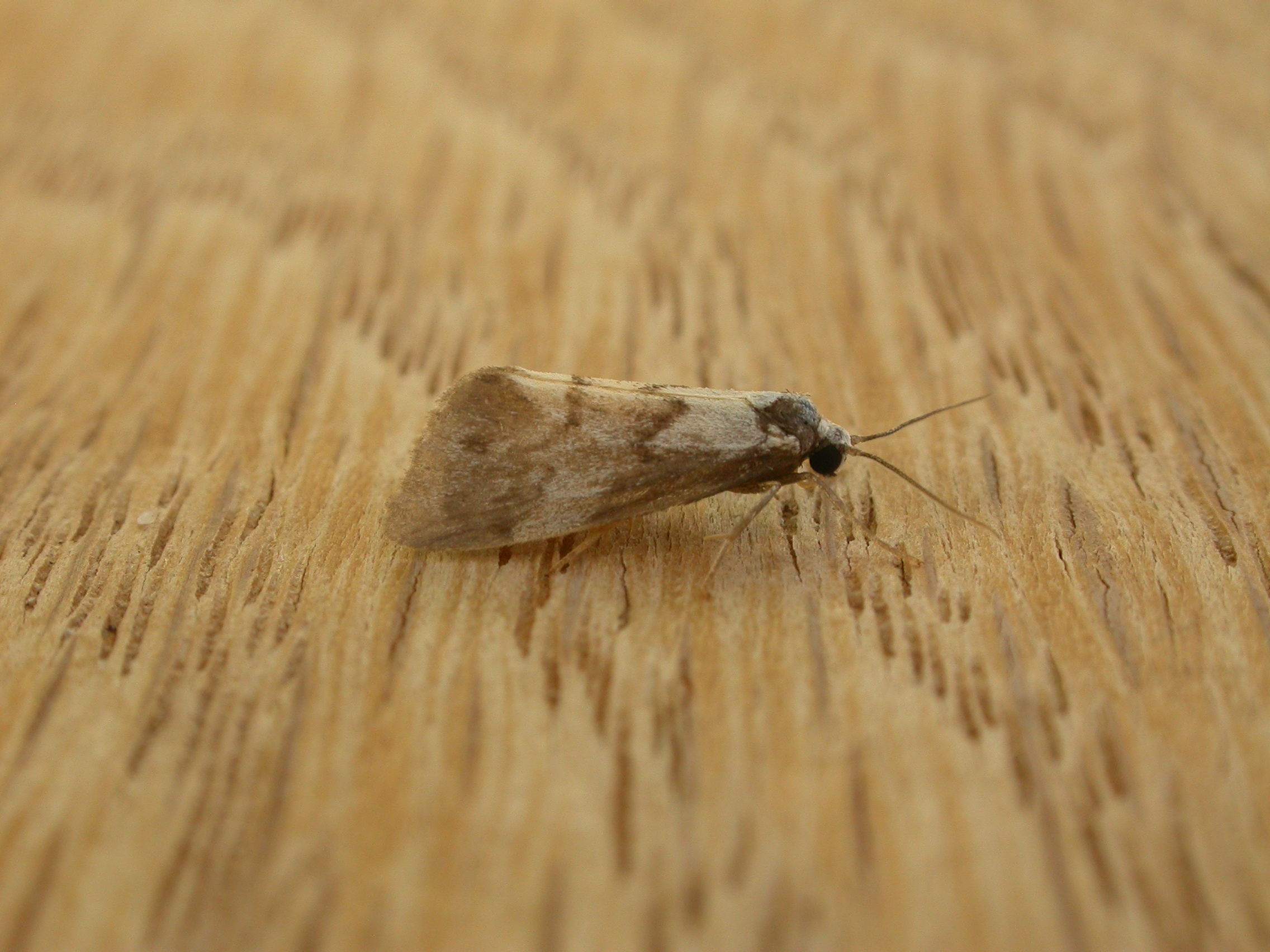

Scientific classification
- Domain: Eukaryota
- Kingdom: Animalia
- Phylum: Arthropoda
- Class: Insecta
- Order: Lepidoptera
- Superfamily: Noctuoidea
- Family: Erebidae
- Subfamily: Arctiinae
- Genus: Philenora
- Species: P. malthaca

Binomial name
- Philenora malthaca Turner, 1944

= Philenora malthaca =

Species of moth

Philenora malthaca is a moth of the subfamily Arctiinae first described by Alfred Jefferis Turner in 1944. It is known in Australia from the south-east coastal regions of New South Wales. There is a single record from Dromana in Victoria.
