= Ladda plancus =

Scientific classification
- Kingdom: Animalia
- Phylum: Arthropoda
- Clade: Pancrustacea
- Class: Insecta
- Order: Lepidoptera
- Family: Hesperiidae
- Genus: Ladda
- Species: L. plancus

Binomial name
- Ladda plancus (Hopffer, 1874)

Synonyms
- Carterocephalus plancus Hopffer, 1874; Pamphila hurleyi Weeks, 1901; Dalla plancus (Hopffer, 1874)

Species of butterfly

Ladda plancus is a species of butterfly in the family Hesperiidae. It is found in Peru and Bolivia.
