= Philenora brunneata =

Scientific classification
- Kingdom: Animalia
- Phylum: Arthropoda
- Clade: Pancrustacea
- Class: Insecta
- Order: Lepidoptera
- Superfamily: Noctuoidea
- Family: Erebidae
- Subfamily: Arctiinae
- Genus: Philenora
- Species: P. brunneata

Binomial name
- Philenora brunneata Daniel, 1965

Species of moth

Philenora brunneata is a moth in the subfamily Arctiinae. It was described by Franz Daniel in 1965. It is found in Afghanistan.

== Bibliography ==
- Pitkin, Brian & Jenkins, Paul. "Search results Family: Arctiidae". Butterflies and Moths of the World. Natural History Museum, London.
