= Carterocephalus =

- C. mandan, Banff, AB, Canada

Scientific classification
- Kingdom: Animalia
- Phylum: Arthropoda
- Clade: Pancrustacea
- Class: Insecta
- Order: Lepidoptera
- Family: Hesperiidae
- Subfamily: Heteropterinae
- Genus: Carterocephalus; Lederer, 1852

Species
- See text

Genus of butterflies

Carterocephalus is a Holarctic genus of skipperlings in the skipper family, Hesperiidae.

The wing colour is yellow, white, dark-brown and black with a variously spotted appearance. The hindwing upperside is dark with clear cut rounded lighter spots. The majority of species are endemic to China.

== Species ==
Listed alphabetically:

- Carterocephalus abax Oberthür, 1886 - Tibet
- Carterocephalus alcinoides Lee, 1962 - Yunnan
- Carterocephalus alcina Evans, 1939 - Yunnan
- Carterocephalus argyrostigma (Eversmann, 1851) - Siberia, Mongolia and China
- Carterocephalus avanti (de Nicéville, 1886) – orange and silver mountain hopper – Tibet
- Carterocephalus canopunctatus (Nabokov 1941)
- Carterocephalus christophi Grum-Grshimailo, 1891 - Tibet, western China
- Carterocephalus dieckmanni Graesser, 1888 - China
- Carterocephalus flavomaculatus Oberthür, 1886 - Tibet, West China
- Carterocephalus gemmatus Leech, 1891
- Carterocephalus habaensis Yoshino, 1997 - Yunnan
- Carterocephalus houangty Oberthür, 1886 - Tibet, western China
- Carterocephalus mandan Oberthür, 1891
- Carterocephalus micio Oberthür, 1891 - China
- Carterocephalus niveomaculatus Oberthür, 1886 - Tibet, West and South China
- Carterocephalus palaemon (Pallas, 1771) – chequered skipper
- Carterocephalus pulchra (Leech, 1891) - Tibet, western China
- Carterocephalus silvicola (Meigen, 1829) – northern chequered skipper
- Carterocephalus skada (W. H. Edwards, 1870) Arctic skipper, arctic skipperling

=== Former species ===
- Carterocephalus plancus Hopffer, 1874 - transferred to Ladda plancus (Hopffer, 1874)

== Gallery ==
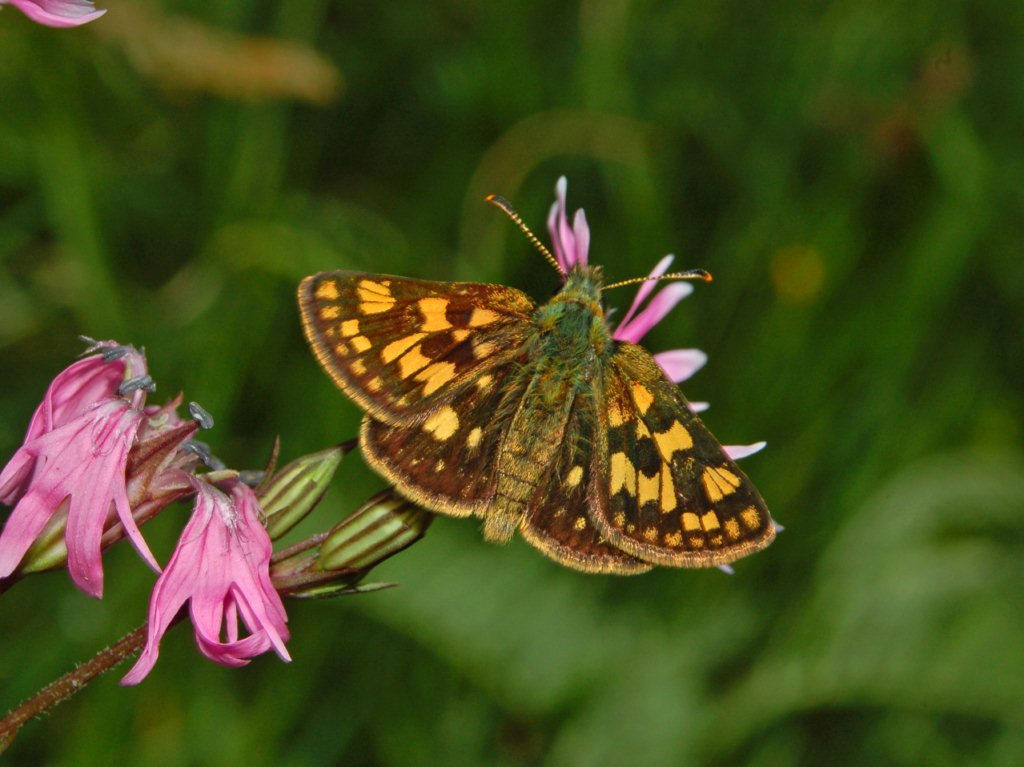
Carterocephalus palaemon, dorsal view

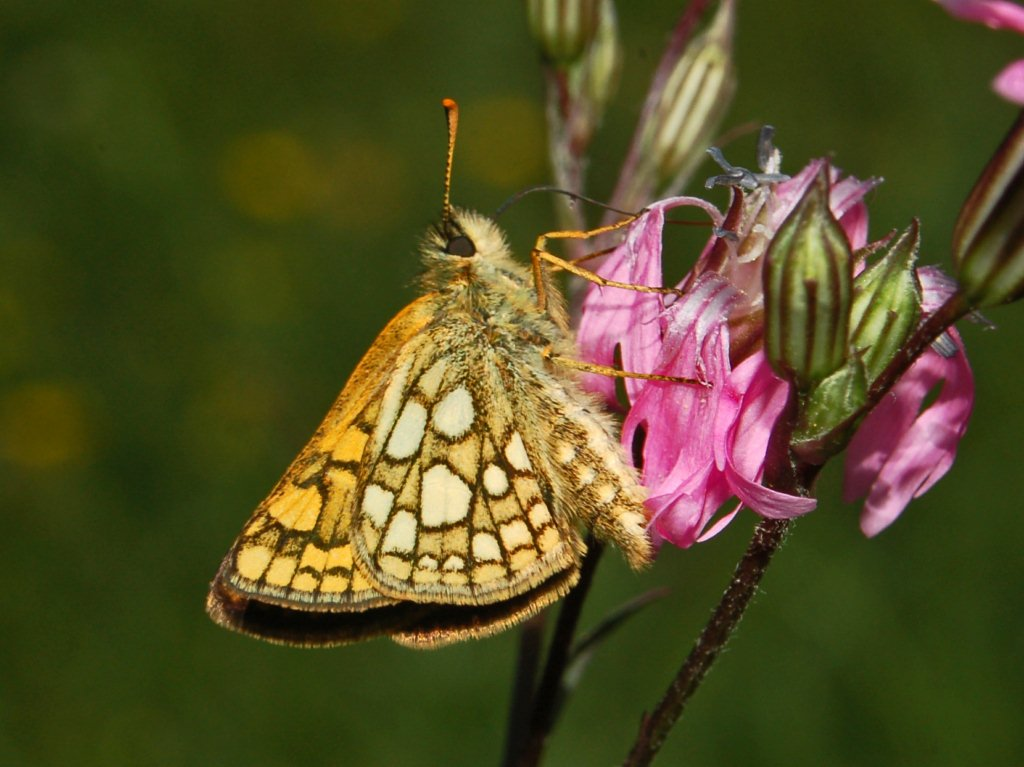
Carterocephalus palaemon, lateral view

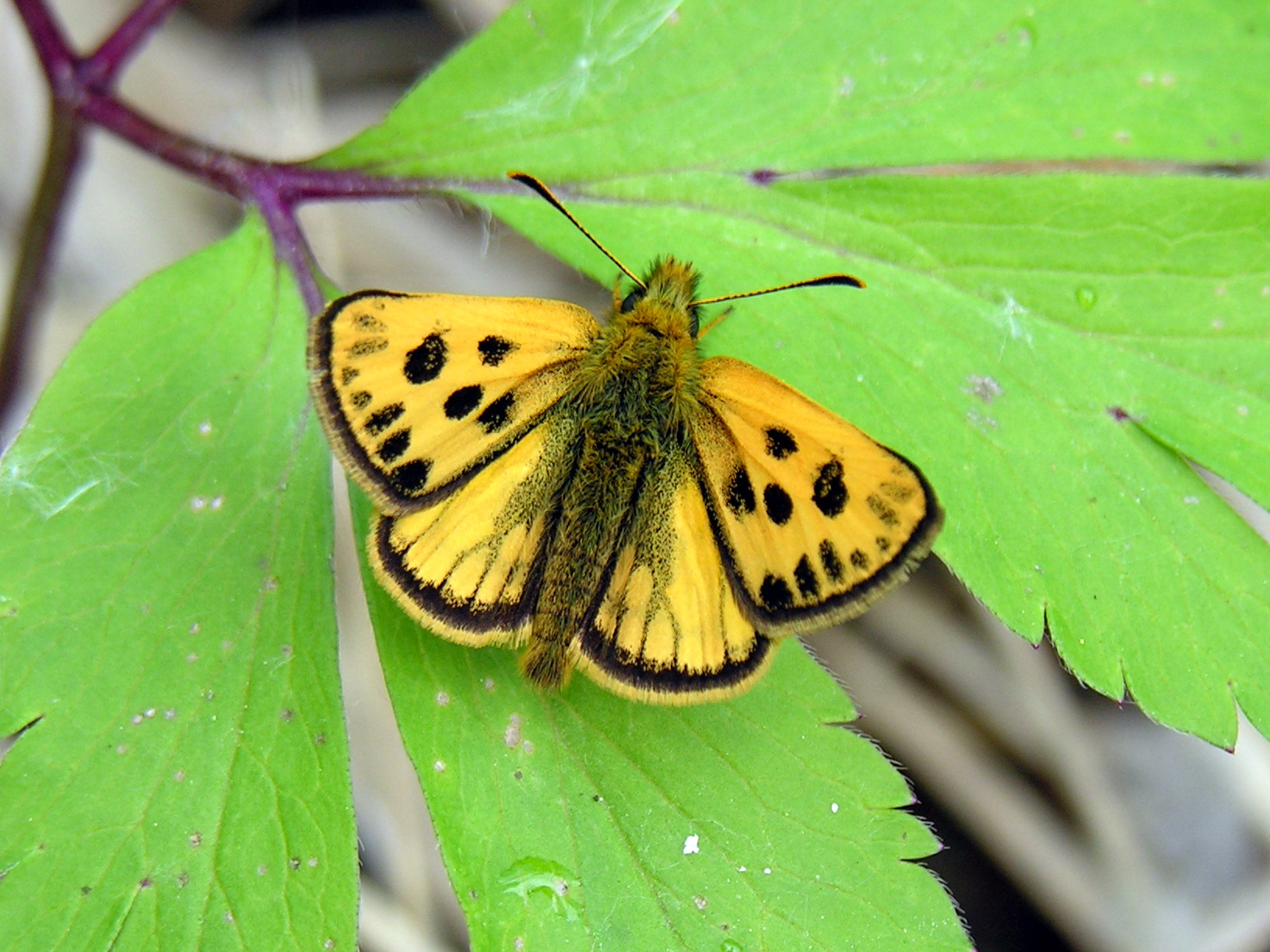
Carterocephalus silvicola

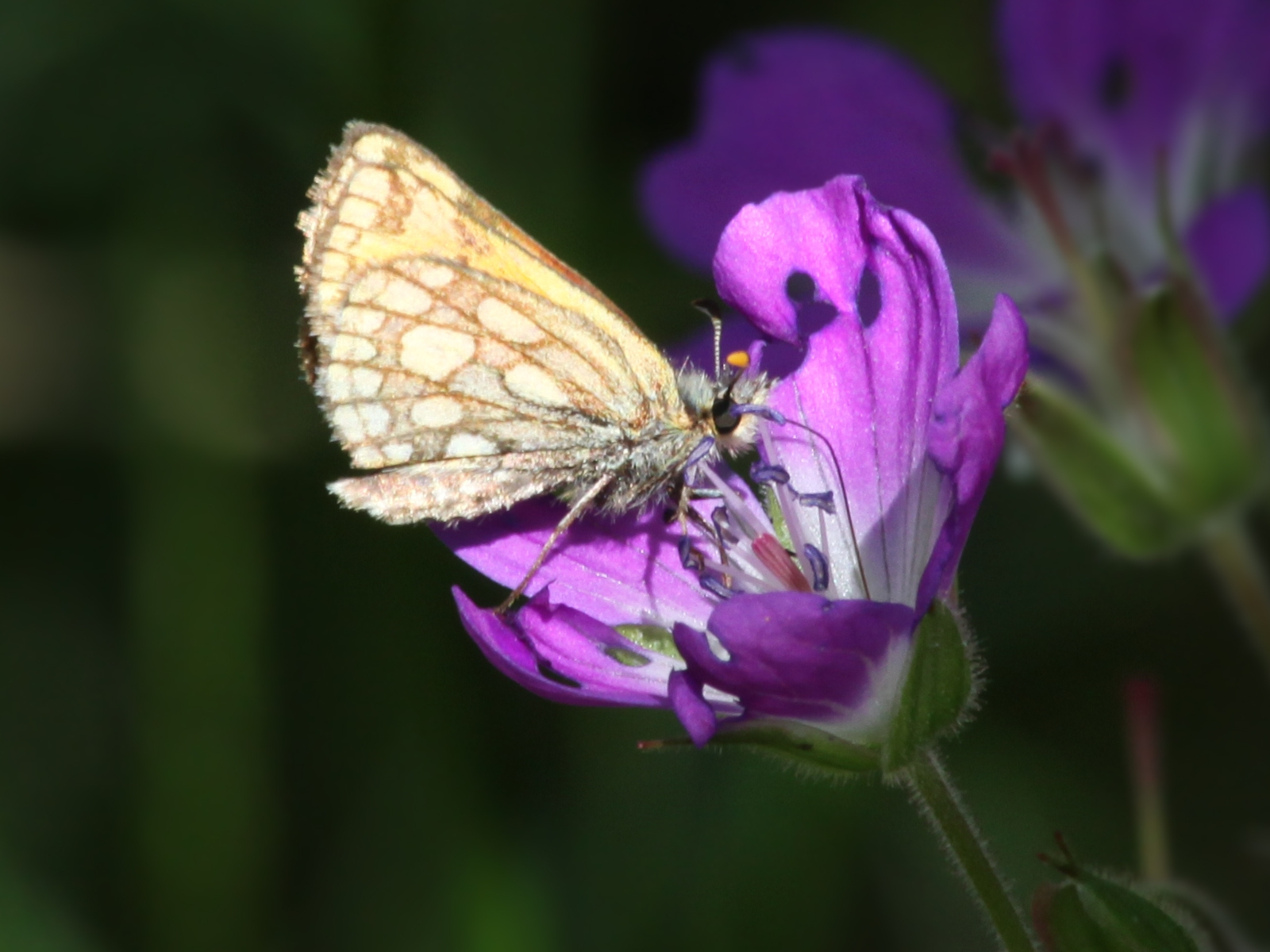
Carterocephalus silvicola, lateral view
