= Ochrota nigrolimbata =

Scientific classification
- Kingdom: Animalia
- Phylum: Arthropoda
- Class: Insecta
- Order: Lepidoptera
- Superfamily: Noctuoidea
- Family: Erebidae
- Subfamily: Arctiinae
- Genus: Ochrota
- Species: O. nigrolimbata

Binomial name
- Ochrota nigrolimbata Toulgoët, 1965

Species of moth

Ochrota nigrolimbata is a moth of the subfamily Arctiinae. It was described by Hervé de Toulgoët in 1965. It is found on Madagascar.
