= Ochrota malagassa =

Scientific classification
- Domain: Eukaryota
- Kingdom: Animalia
- Phylum: Arthropoda
- Class: Insecta
- Order: Lepidoptera
- Superfamily: Noctuoidea
- Family: Erebidae
- Subfamily: Arctiinae
- Genus: Ochrota
- Species: O. malagassa

Binomial name
- Ochrota malagassa (Strand, 1912)

Synonyms
- Philenora malagassa Strand, 1912

Species of moth

Ochrota malagassa is a moth of the subfamily Arctiinae. It was described by Strand in 1912. It is found in Madagascar.
