= Philenora pteridopola =

Scientific classification
- Domain: Eukaryota
- Kingdom: Animalia
- Phylum: Arthropoda
- Class: Insecta
- Order: Lepidoptera
- Superfamily: Noctuoidea
- Family: Erebidae
- Subfamily: Arctiinae
- Genus: Philenora
- Species: P. pteridopola

Binomial name
- Philenora pteridopola Turner, 1922

Species of moth

Philenora pteridopola is a moth in the subfamily Arctiinae. It was described by Alfred Jefferis Turner in 1922. It is found in Australia.
