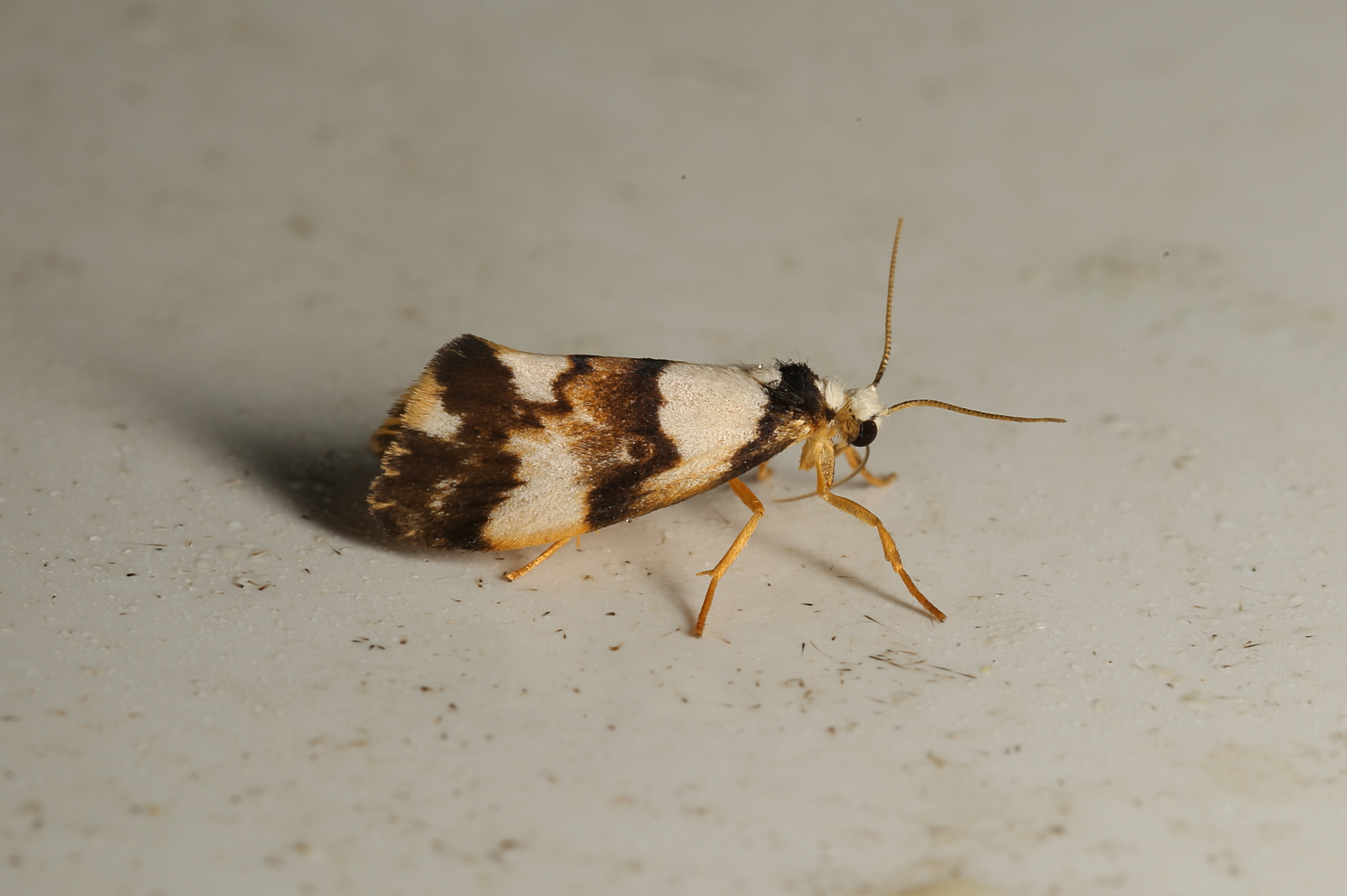

Scientific classification
- Kingdom: Animalia
- Phylum: Arthropoda
- Class: Insecta
- Order: Lepidoptera
- Superfamily: Noctuoidea
- Family: Erebidae
- Subfamily: Arctiinae
- Genus: Philenora
- Species: P. aspectalella

Binomial name
- Philenora aspectalella (Walker, 1864)

Synonyms
- Oecophora aspectalella Walker, 1864; Tinea oecophorella Walker, 1866

= Philenora aspectalella =

Species of moth

Philenora aspectalella is a moth in the subfamily Arctiinae. It was described by Francis Walker in 1864. It is found in the Australian states of Queensland, New South Wales, Victoria and the southern part of Western Australia.

The wingspan is about 20 mm. Adults are white with two jagged black bars across the forewings.
