= Ochrota nyassa =

Scientific classification
- Domain: Eukaryota
- Kingdom: Animalia
- Phylum: Arthropoda
- Class: Insecta
- Order: Lepidoptera
- Superfamily: Noctuoidea
- Family: Erebidae
- Subfamily: Arctiinae
- Genus: Ochrota
- Species: O. nyassa

Binomial name
- Ochrota nyassa (Strand, 1912)

Synonyms
- Philenora nyassa Strand, 1912; Philenora subterminalipicta Strand, 1912

Species of moth

Ochrota nyassa is a moth of the subfamily Arctiinae. It was described by Strand in 1912. It is found in Malawi.
