= Ochrota =

Scientific classification
- Domain: Eukaryota
- Kingdom: Animalia
- Phylum: Arthropoda
- Class: Insecta
- Order: Lepidoptera
- Superfamily: Noctuoidea
- Family: Erebidae
- Subfamily: Arctiinae
- Tribe: Lithosiini
- Genus: Ochrota; Hopffer, 1862

Synonyms
- Bettonia Butler, 1898

Genus of moths

Ochrota is a genus of moths in the subfamily Arctiinae erected by Carl Heinrich Hopffer in 1898.

== Species ==
Some species of this genus are:

- Ochrota arida (Toulgoët, 1955)
- Ochrota asuraeformis (Strand, 1912)
- Ochrota bicoloria Toulgoët, 1958
- Ochrota convergens Toulgoët, 1956
- Ochrota dissimilis Toulgoët, 1956
- Ochrota malagassa (Strand, 1912)
- Ochrota nigrolimbata Toulgoët, 1965
- Ochrota nyassa (Strand, 1912)
- Ochrota septentrionalis Toulgoët, 1956
- Ochrota unicolor (Hopffer, 1857)

== Formerly placed here ==
- Ochrota bipuncta (Hampson, 1900)
