= Philenora irregularis =

Scientific classification
- Domain: Eukaryota
- Kingdom: Animalia
- Phylum: Arthropoda
- Class: Insecta
- Order: Lepidoptera
- Superfamily: Noctuoidea
- Family: Erebidae
- Subfamily: Arctiinae
- Genus: Philenora
- Species: P. irregularis

Binomial name
- Philenora irregularis (T. P. Lucas, 1890)

Synonyms
- Comarchis irregularis T. P. Lucas, 1890

Species of moth

Philenora irregularis is a moth in the subfamily Arctiinae. It was described by Thomas Pennington Lucas in 1890. It is found in Australia.
