= Philenora cataplex =

Scientific classification
- Domain: Eukaryota
- Kingdom: Animalia
- Phylum: Arthropoda
- Class: Insecta
- Order: Lepidoptera
- Superfamily: Noctuoidea
- Family: Erebidae
- Subfamily: Arctiinae
- Genus: Philenora
- Species: P. cataplex

Binomial name
- Philenora cataplex Turner, 1940

Species of moth

Philenora cataplex is a moth in the subfamily Arctiinae. It was described by Alfred Jefferis Turner in 1940. It is found in Australia.
