= Ochrota arida =

Scientific classification
- Kingdom: Animalia
- Phylum: Arthropoda
- Class: Insecta
- Order: Lepidoptera
- Superfamily: Noctuoidea
- Family: Erebidae
- Subfamily: Arctiinae
- Genus: Ochrota
- Species: O. arida

Binomial name
- Ochrota arida (Toulgoët, 1955)

Synonyms
- Philenora arida Toulgoët, 1955

Species of moth

Ochrota arida is a moth of the subfamily Arctiinae. It was described by Hervé de Toulgoët in 1955. It is found on Madagascar.
