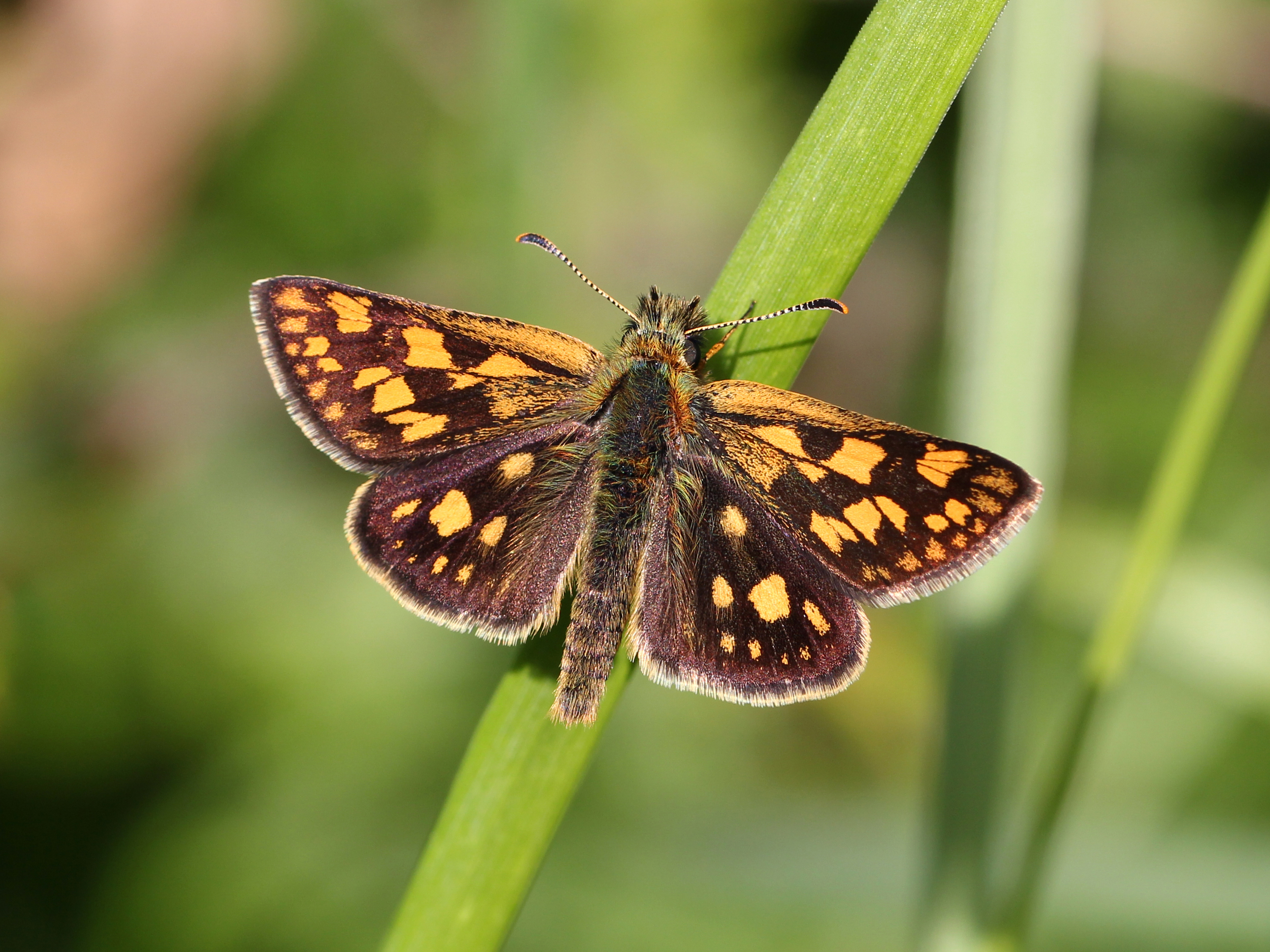

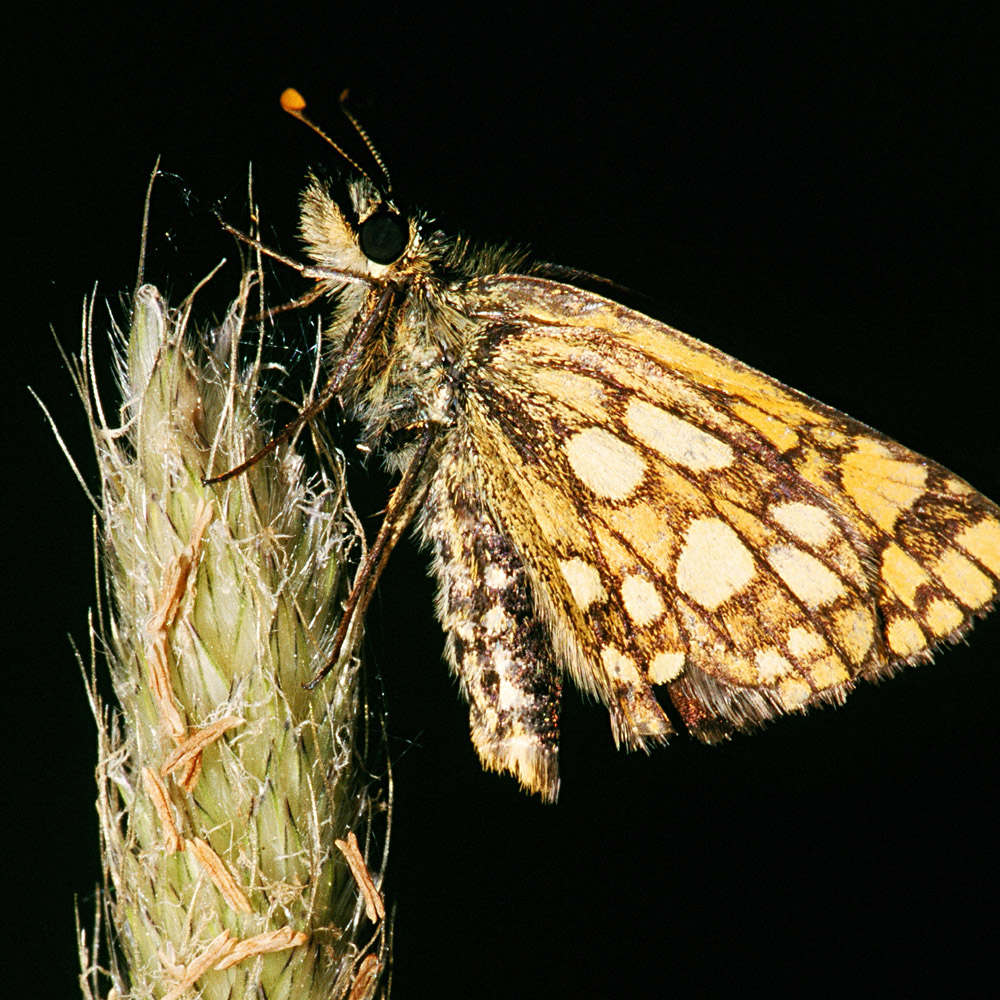

Conservation status
- Least Concern (IUCN 3.1)

Scientific classification
- Kingdom: Animalia
- Phylum: Arthropoda
- Class: Insecta
- Order: Lepidoptera
- Family: Hesperiidae
- Genus: Carterocephalus
- Species: C. palaemon

Binomial name
- Carterocephalus palaemon (Pallas, 1771)

= Carterocephalus palaemon =

Chequered skipper

Species of butterfly

Carterocephalus palaemon, the chequered skipper or arctic skipper, not to be confused with the large chequered skipper, is a species of woodland butterfly in the family Hesperiidae. This butterfly can live in grasslands. The upperside of the butterfly is brown with orange spots and on its underside the chequered skipper is orange with brown spots. Chequered skippers are found in Great Britain and other European regions, but seen locally in Japan and in North America. The size of the chequered skipper ranges from 19 to 32 mm with females being larger. In the 1970s, the chequered skipper went extinct in England due to the new management of the woodlands.

== Description ==
This butterfly has a wingspan of 29 to 31 mm. The uppersides of chequered skippers are dark brown with orange scales at the base of the wings and golden spots, giving it its English name of chequered skipper. The basic pattern on the underside is similar but the forewings are orange with dark spots, and the hindwings are russet with cream spots rimmed in black. The sexes are similar although females are generally slightly larger.

== Distribution ==
In Britain, the chequered skipper was formerly resident in England and Scotland. Now, the chequered skipper is only found in western Scotland. A programme is under way to reintroduce the species to England. The butterfly has also reached parts of Japan but faces threats there. In North America the chequered skipper is also known as the arctic skipper and is found in the northern coasts and expands to central Alaska. The chequered skipper can be seen in central California. The chequered skipper has been seen along the coasts of Canada. It is generally considered a woodland butterfly and breeds in and around damp woodland, favoring clearings and woodland paths and seems to have a particular attraction to blue woodland flowers.

=== British population ===
The chequered skipper has been extinct in England since 1976 but has stable populations in western Scotland. Attempts to reintroduce the butterfly to England were started in the 1990s. It was previously widespread in the Midlands, with isolated populations as far south as Devon and Hampshire. It is thought that the cessation of coppicing in English woodlands is the main cause of its extinction. It was only discovered in Scotland in 1939 where it was found in grassland on the edges of open broad-leaved woodland. In May 2018, 50 individual chequered skippers are to be reintroduced to Rockingham Forest in Northamptonshire by a Butterfly Conservation-led Back from the Brink project.

=== Habitat ===
Though the chequered skipper is a woodland butterfly it can also be found in bogs, at the edges of streams, and at grassy forest openings in both Great Britain and northern parts of the United States. Chequered skippers can breed in open grasslands in Scotland. In woodland areas the breeding sites happen at the edges of rivers and the bottom of slopes. Though there is a small range in the areas the butterfly can live in, these areas tend to have a smaller range in seasonal and temperature range. The presence of the M. caerulea is really important in determining habitat in Scotland and in England the Bromus is essential. In North America, chequered skippers can be found around forest trails, forest edges, and open grassy areas. Even though the chequered skipper goes by arctic skipper it does not live in Arctic areas.

== Home range and territoriality ==
Males defend territories and intercept passing females from favored perches. This behavior tends to occur when there are concentrations of females, larvae, or food plants. The area where the butterflies place the larvae are in between woodland soils and peats. Chequered skippers set up home close to nectar sources. However, they are careful to not let their territory attract other males. When it is flight season males are known to spread their home farther away from each other.

== Food resources ==
=== Caterpillars ===
By laying her eggs in a nitrogen-rich environment, the female increases her offspring's chances of finding food. The amount of nitrogen in the plant can change, however, so the outcome of her initial deposition is determined by various environmental factors. Caterpillars in response change their behavior by eating from different parts of the plant depending on the nitrogen availability. Their preferred diet includes leaves of the plants Molinia caerulea and Bromus, and the caterpillar's fitness is affected by the nutrients that the plants are growing in. North American caterpillars feed on the purple reedgrass, Calamagrostis purpurascens and other native grasses.

=== Adults ===
Seeing that the chequered skipper is an active butterfly and can travel long distances it needs to keep its energy stores filled. Since the chequered skipper lives an active lifestyle it needs to stay in nectar-rich sources. In North America the adults are eating from flower's nectar and they include wild iris and Jacob's ladder.

== Parental care ==
Males defend territories and intercept passing females from favored perches. This behavior tends to occur when there are concentrations of females, larvae, or food plants. The area where the butterflies place the larvae are in between woodland soils and peats. Chequered skippers set up home close to nectar sources. However, they are careful to not let their territory attract other males. When it is flight season males are known to spread their home farther away from each other.

== Life history ==
The life cycle of the chequered skipper starts in early June and ends slightly before the July of the following year. This species of butterfly is single brooded.

=== Egg ===
Eggs are singly laid, 20–30 cm above the ground, on the upperside leaf blade of Molinia caerulea or purple moor grass. The eggs are tiny, white, and dome- shaped. The eggs are laid in early June and it takes two to three weeks before it hatches.

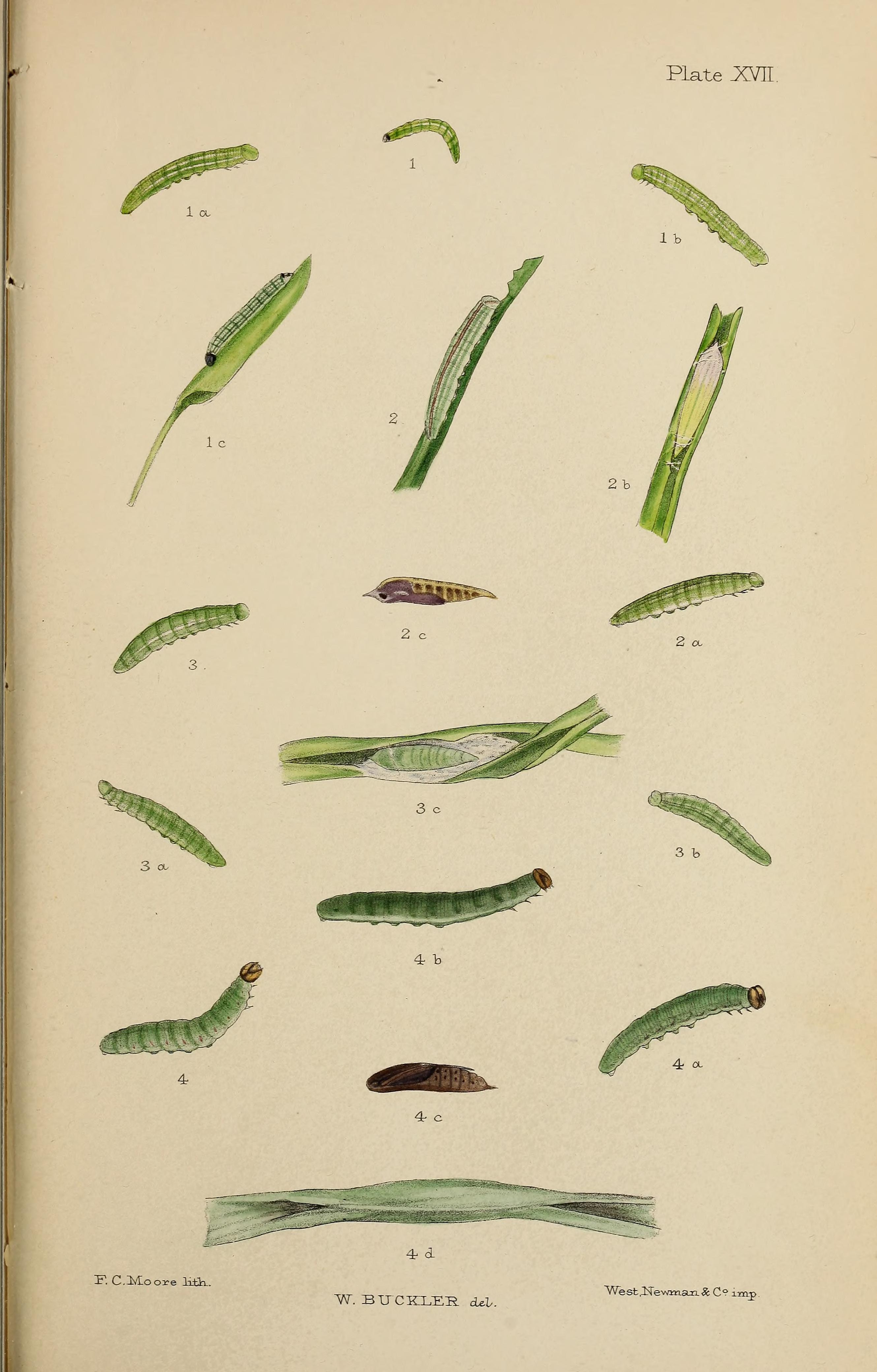
Figs 1 larva after 2nd moult 1c larvae after 3rd moult 1a, 1b larvae after 4th moult

=== Caterpillar ===
Immediately after the egg hatches, the larva begins to make its own shelter by rolling a leaf blade with silk into the shape of a tube. It leaves the shelter to eat surrounding leaves. The caterpillar molts five times before it is ready to pupate. In between the molting the caterpillar makes a new shelter to accommodate for its growing size. This process is from July to September. By the end of September the caterpillar makes one more shelter using two or three blades of M. caerulea and then hibernates; it comes back out in early spring. The caterpillar is no longer eating by April and begins to pupate, but before it pupates it can wait up to a week.

=== Pupa ===
Pupation occurs on the ground by the bases of tussocks. Six weeks later a butterfly comes out of the pupa.

=== Adult ===
Around the middle of May the adult has emerged from its pupa. The females and the males mate, then the females lay the eggs on the M. caerulea. Butterflies can be seen before dawn and even after dusk.

== Migration ==
These butterflies fly around spring time when there are lower temperatures and stay in the cooler and unpredictable climate that is Scotland. How far they fly is based on the amount of resources and the adequate habitat that there is.

== Enemies ==
There are no known enemies of the chequered skipper. However, changes in their woodland habit decrease their population size. This decrease in population size is due to the decline of coppicing, which is the cutting of trees close to the base and allowing regrowth to happen. New management of the chequered skippers' habitat also plays a role in its survivability. Chequered skippers' populations decreased in England due to coppicing coming to a halt in the 1950s. By 1976, they were only found in Scotland.

== Mating ==
According to Ravenscroft's study, male chequered skippers are territorial and will determine where mating occurs as they decide optimal places to live. Most males find multiple perches, that they guard to catch any potential mates that are pass through their territory. Males make short and brief round trips near their territory in order to defend it. Researchers deduced that male decision in mating location was not due to richness in resources, but rather due to varying temperature relations. Females generally gravitate to territories based on this as well.

== Physiology ==
Chequered skippers are small and because of their size flight is fast and inefficient. When they fly it is almost like they are skipping above the plants. This skipping makes it hard for them to be followed.

== Conservation ==
Conservation of this butterfly is being called for because there once was an abundance of chequered skippers throughout the United Kingdom, but over time the population decreased, so that they are now predominantly seen only in western Scotland. One important factor that played into this outcome is the overgrazing of the larval habitat by the sheep which decreased the nutrients in the M. caerulea thus causing the larvae to have a hard time gathering the resources it needs in order to survive. The hunting of deer decreased the amount of grazing that is accomplished usually, which causes shrub to form and that in turn results in adult habitats suffering. A new company was managing the woodlands in the mid-twentieth century and it resulted in the deforestation of many areas in the United Kingdom and that also allowed the adults to suffer and find different places to live. In North America, conservation is not required for the chequered skipper.

Nature Conservation Act in Scotland protects the chequered skipper. In various butterfly association high priority is given to the chequered skipper such as the UK Biodiversity Action Plan, Butterfly Conservation priority. However, the European status states that the butterfly is not threatened. A Species Action Plan, written in 1996, has a specific way in which it want to protect the butterfly from reintroducing the species into parts of the United Kingdom to denying grants to plant conifers. This action plan was going to be maintained annually.

== Images ==
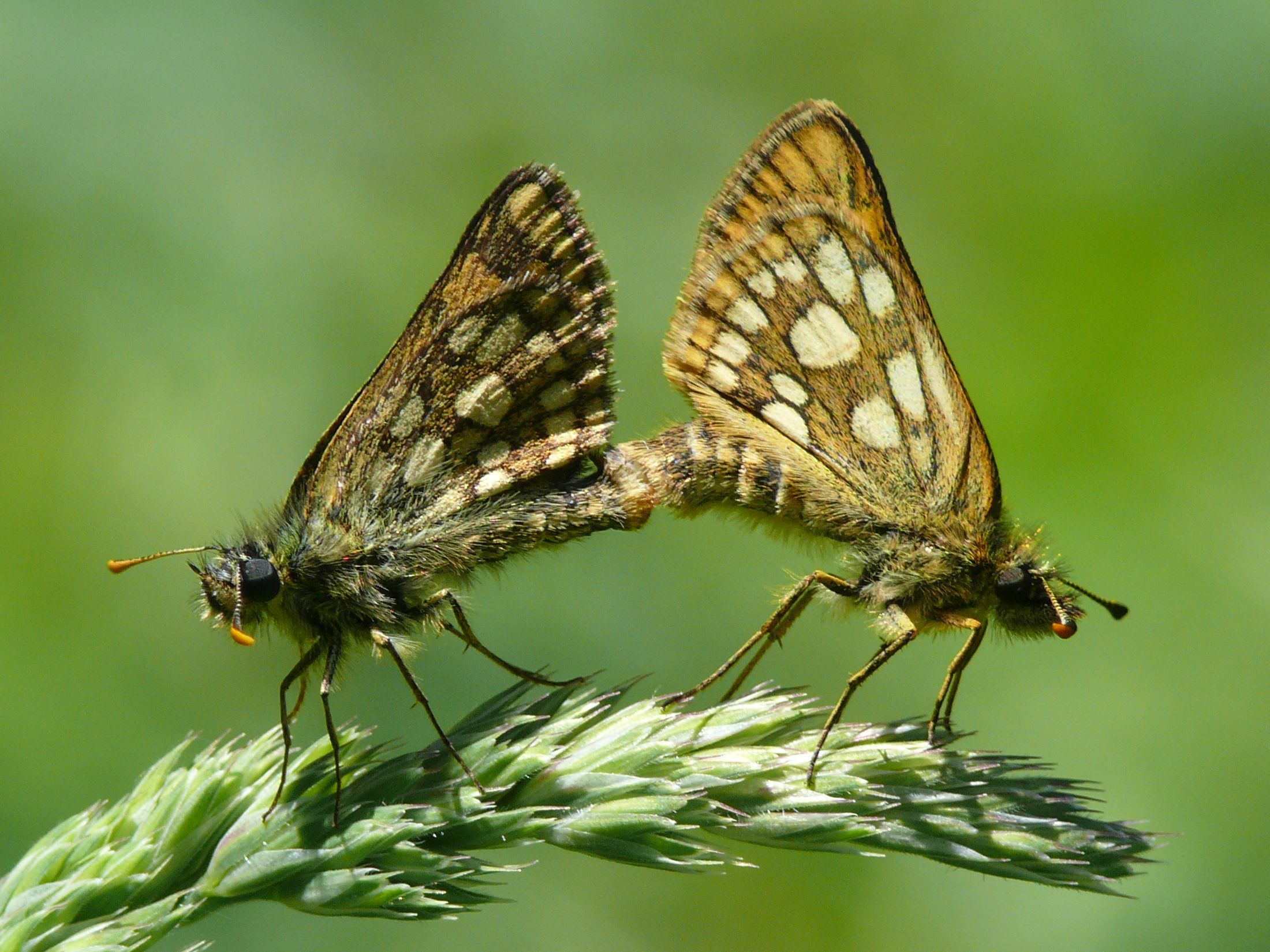
Mating

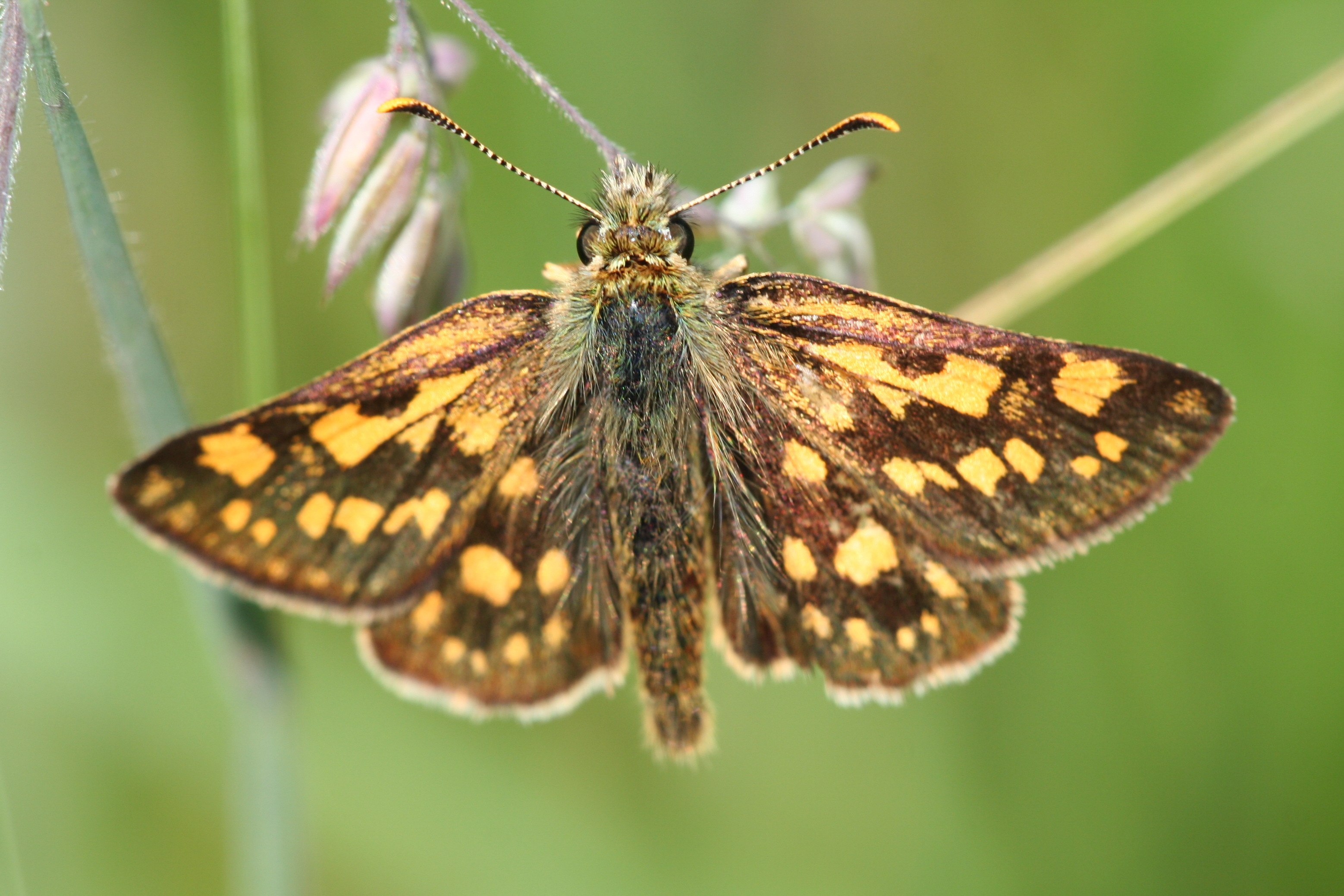

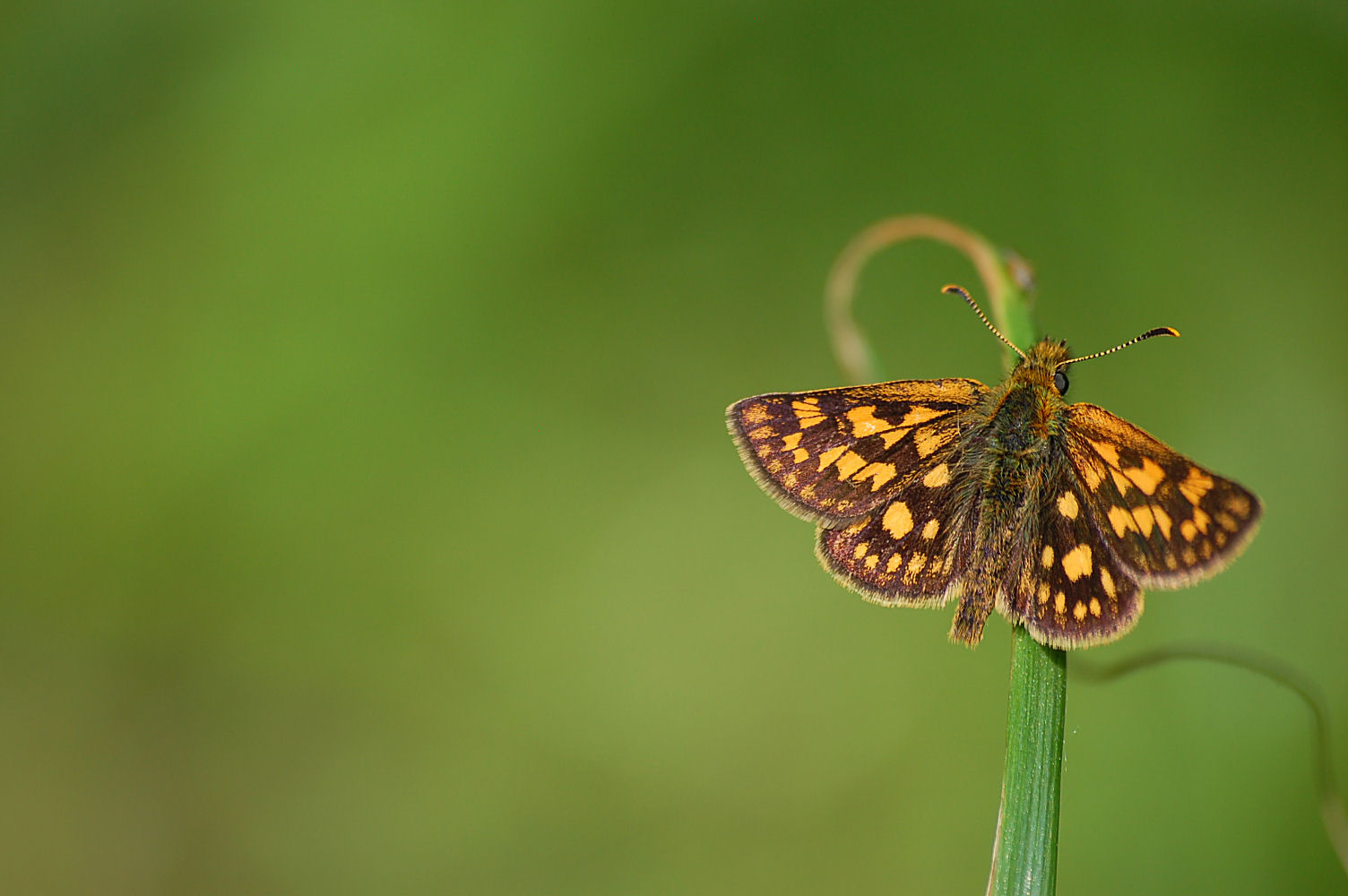

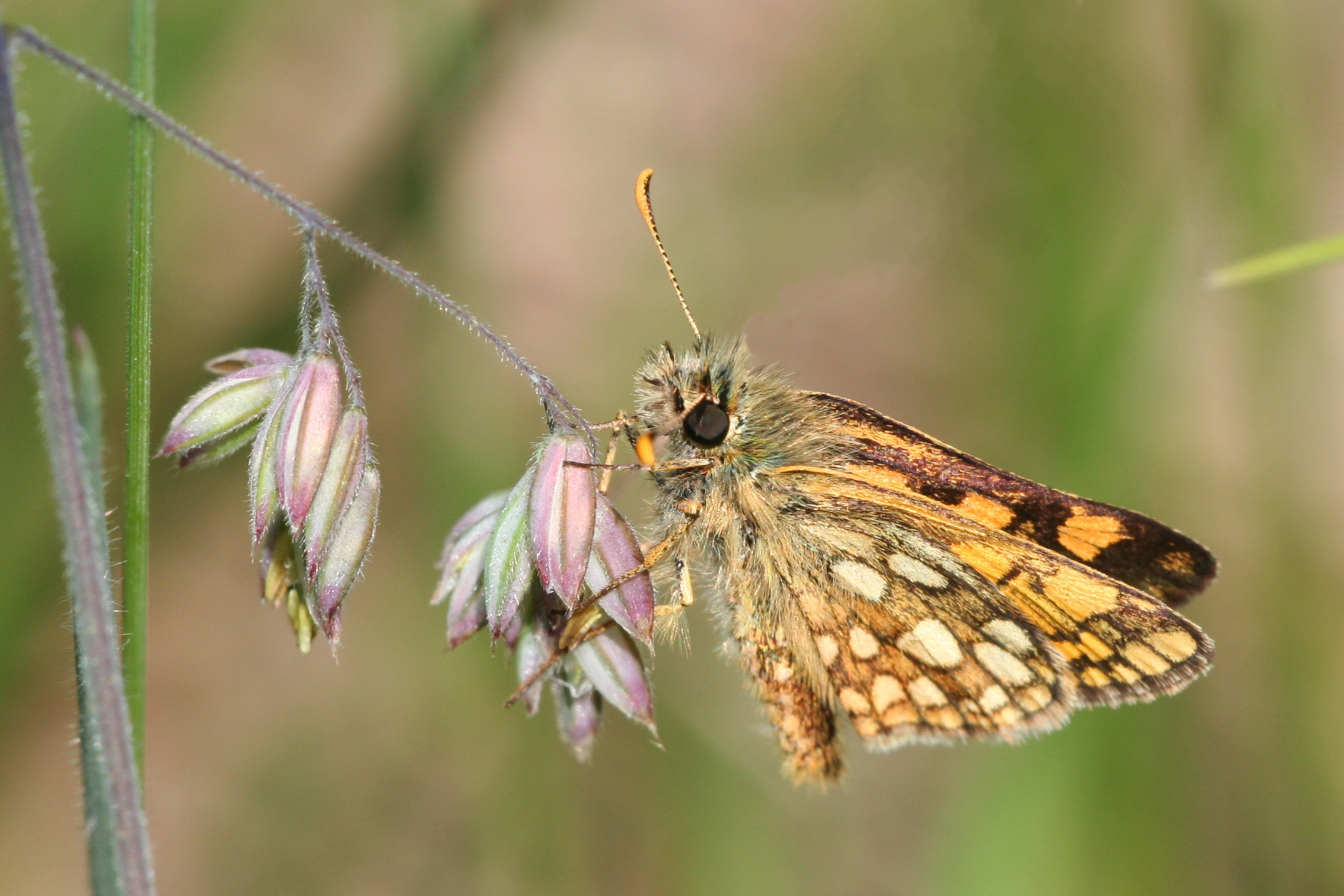

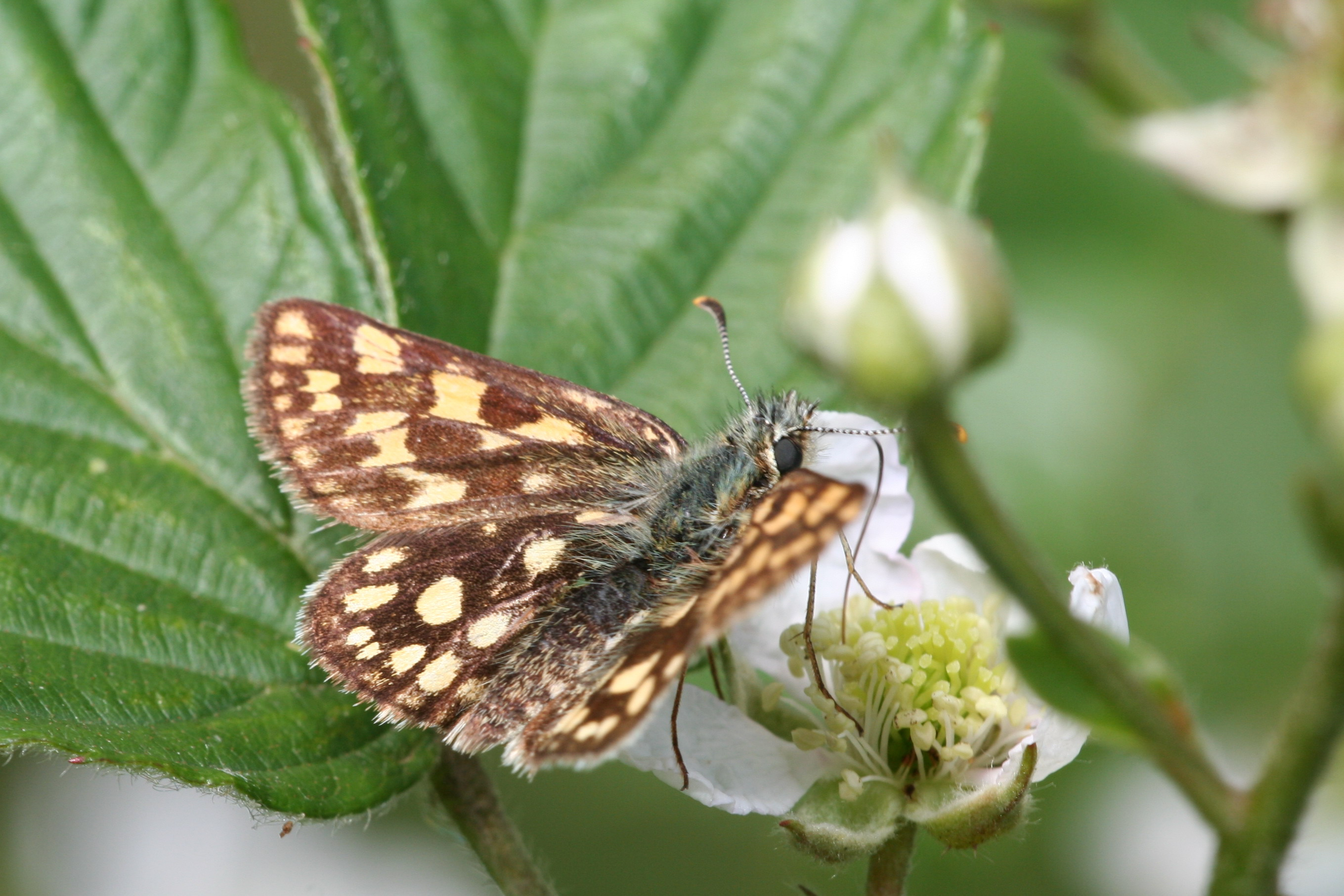

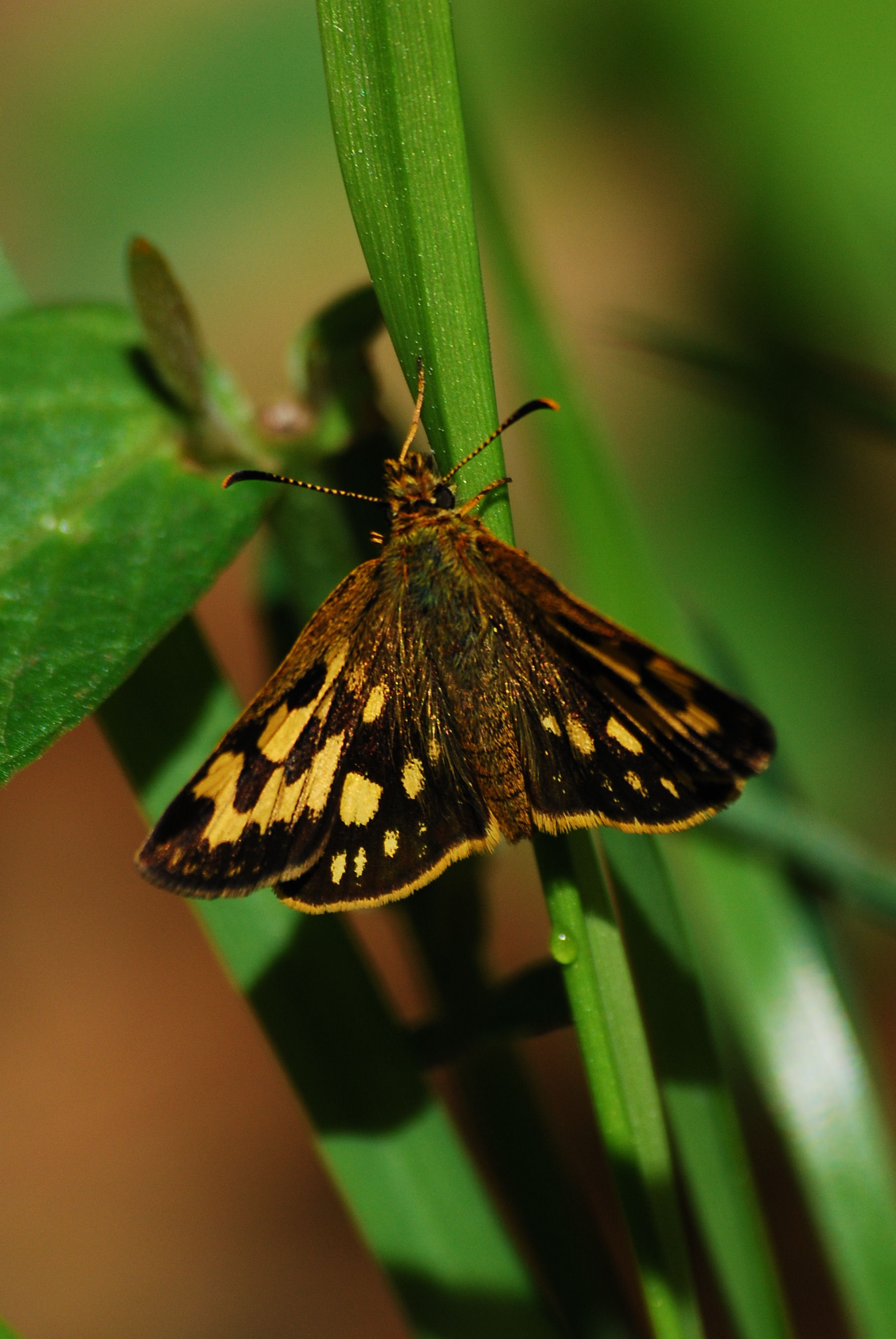
