= Carl Heinrich Hopffer =

German entomologist (1810-1876)

Carl Heinrich Hopffer (1810–1876) was a German entomologist who specialised in Lepidoptera.

Hopffer was a curator (Custos) at the Museum für Naturkunde in Berlin. He described many new species mainly in the following works.

- Neue Schmetterlinge der Insekten-Sammlung des Konigl. Zoologischen Musei der Universitat zu Berlin with Johann Christoph Friedrich Klug (1836)
- Lepidoptera Diurna. In Hr Peters legte von sie nem Reisewerke uber Mossambique… Diagnosen neurer Coleopteren und Lepidopteren. Berichte uber die zur Bekanntmachung geeigneten Verhandlungen der Konigl. Preuss. Akademie der Wissenschaften zu Berlin 1855:639-643 (1855)
- Naturwissenschaftliche Reise nach Mossambique, auf befehl Seiner Majestat des konigs Friedrich Wilhelm IV in den jahfren 1842 bis 1848 ausfefuhrt von Wilhelm C.H. Peters ( Zoologie. V. Insecten und myriopoden) Berlin: in German (1862)
- Ueber Cenea Stoll. Entomologische Zeitung. Herausgegeben von dem entomologischen Vereine zu Stettin 27 (1/3), pp. [131-132.] (1865)
- Neue Arten der Gattung Papilio im Berliner Museum. Entomologische Zeitung. Herausgegeben von dem entomologischen Vereine zu Stettin 27 (1/3), pp. [22-32] (1866)
- Bericht über Felder's Lepidoptera der Reise der Fregatte Novara (Fortsetzung) Entomologische Zeitung herausgegeben von dem entomologischen Vereine zu Stettin 30 (10/12), pp. [427-453.] (1869):
- Beitrag zur Lepidopteren-Fauna von Celebes Entomologische Zeitung herausgegeben von dem entomologischen Vereine zu Stettin 35 (1/3), pp. [17-47.] (1874)
- Neue Lepidopteren von Peru und Bolivia. Entomologische Zeitung herausgegeben von dem entomologischen Vereine zu Stettin 35 10-12), pp. [329-371.] (1874)
- Exotische Schmetterlinge. Entomologische Zeitung herausgegeben von dem entomologischen Vereine zu Stettin 40, pp. [47-95, 413-454] (1879)
