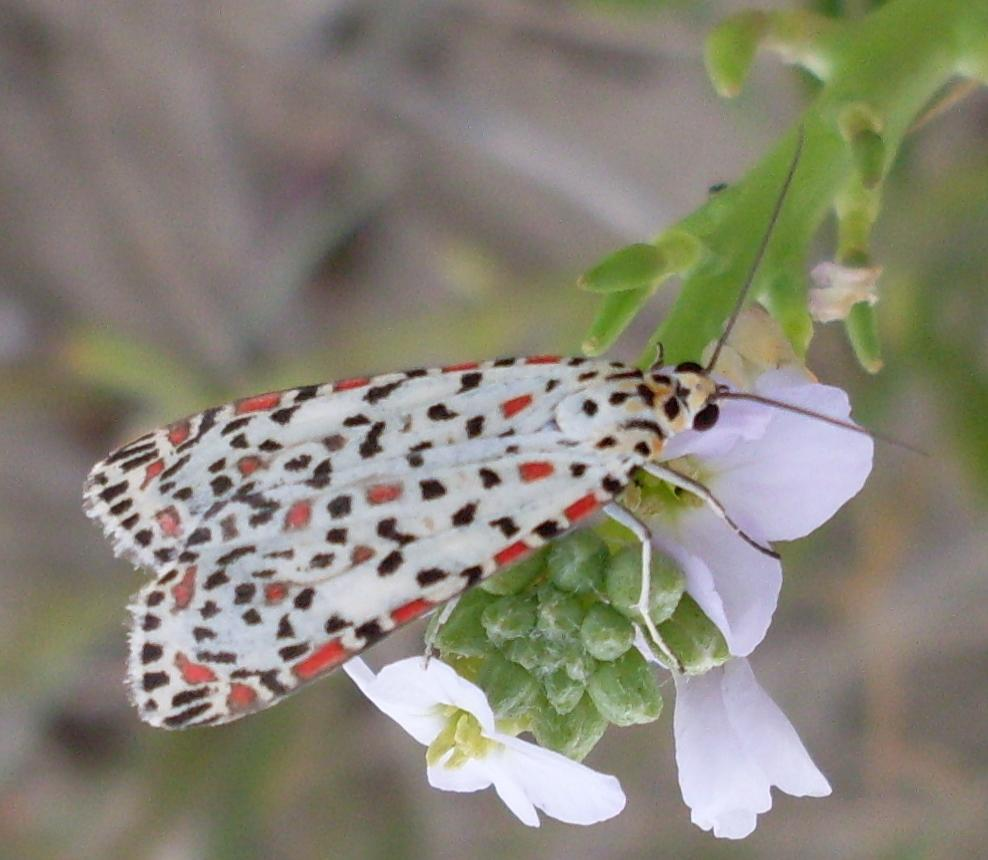
- Utetheisa pulchelloides imago

Scientific classification
- Kingdom: Animalia
- Phylum: Arthropoda
- Class: Insecta
- Order: Lepidoptera
- Superfamily: Noctuoidea
- Family: Erebidae
- Subfamily: Arctiinae
- Tribe: Arctiini
- Subtribe: Callimorphina; Walker, [1865]

Synonyms
- Callimorphina

= Callimorphina =

Subtribe of moths

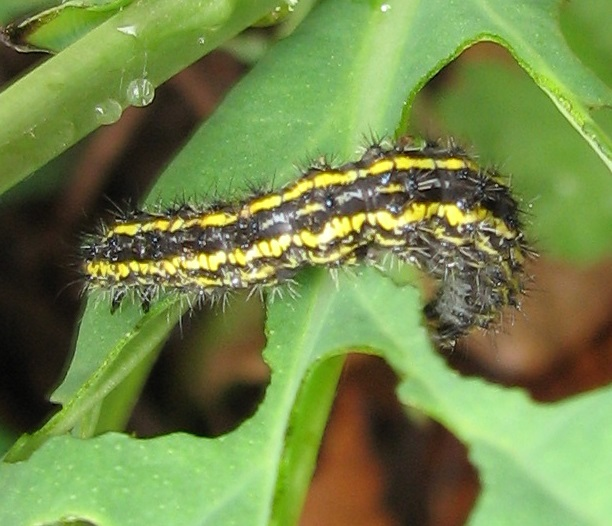
Haploa sp. caterpillar on bluebells

The Callimorphina are a subtribe of woolly bear moths in the family Erebidae. The subtribe was described by Francis Walker in 1865. Many of these moths are easily confused with butterflies, being quite brightly colored and somewhat diurnal. Their antennae are not thickened into "clubs", which is a typical characteristic of butterflies.

== Taxonomy ==
The subtribe was previously classified as a tribe of the former family Arctiidae.

== Genera ==
This list of genera in the subtribe were outlined by Michelle A. DaCosta and Susan J. Weller and by Vladimir Viktorovitch Dubatolov.

- Aglaomorpha
- Axiopoena
- Callimorpha
- Callindra
- Calpenia
- Carcinopyga
- Coscinia
- Cymbalophora
- Dodia
- Epimydia
- Euleechia
- Euplagia
- Haploa
- Kishidaria
- Lacydes
- Nikaea
- Sebastia
- Spiris
- Taicallimorpha
- Tinoliodes
- Tyria
- Utetheisa (often in Nyctemerini)
