= Spiris slovenica =

Scientific classification
- Domain: Eukaryota
- Kingdom: Animalia
- Phylum: Arthropoda
- Class: Insecta
- Order: Lepidoptera
- Superfamily: Noctuoidea
- Family: Erebidae
- Subfamily: Arctiinae
- Genus: Spiris
- Species: S. slovenica

Binomial name
- Spiris slovenica (Daniel, 1939)

Synonyms
- Coscinia striata slovenica Daniel, 1939

Species of moth

Spiris slovenica is a moth in the family Erebidae. It was described by Franz Daniel in 1939. It is found in Slovenia, Italy and Austria.

== Taxonomy ==
The species was described as a subspecies of Spiris striata, but raised to species status in 2012.
