= Actebia fugax =

Scientific classification
- Domain: Eukaryota
- Kingdom: Animalia
- Phylum: Arthropoda
- Class: Insecta
- Order: Lepidoptera
- Superfamily: Noctuoidea
- Family: Noctuidae
- Genus: Actebia
- Species: A. fugax

Binomial name
- Actebia fugax (Treitschke, 1825)

Species of moth

Actebia fugax is a species of moth belonging to the family Noctuidae.

It is native to Central Europe.
