= Dodia kononenkoi =

Scientific classification
- Kingdom: Animalia
- Phylum: Arthropoda
- Class: Insecta
- Order: Lepidoptera
- Superfamily: Noctuoidea
- Family: Erebidae
- Subfamily: Arctiinae
- Genus: Dodia
- Species: D. kononenkoi

Binomial name
- Dodia kononenkoi Tshistjakov & Lafontaine, 1984

Species of moth

Dodia kononenkoi is a moth of the family Erebidae. It was described by Yuri A. Tshistjakov and J. Donald Lafontaine in 1984. It is found in the Russian Far East (Transbaikalia, Sikhote-Alin, Magadan) and Canada (Yukon Territory).

The forewings are even and translucent grey.

== Subspecies ==
- Dodia kononenkoi kononenkoi (Magadan region, Yukon territory)
- Dodia kononenkoi sikhotensis Tshistjakov, 1988 (Primorye: Sikhote-Alin)

Dodia transbaikalensis was described as a subspecies of Dodia kononenkoi, but is now mostly treated as a full species.
