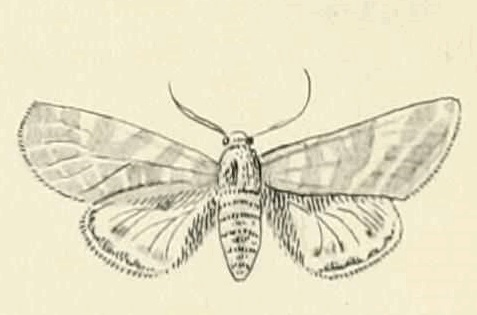

Scientific classification
- Domain: Eukaryota
- Kingdom: Animalia
- Phylum: Arthropoda
- Class: Insecta
- Order: Lepidoptera
- Superfamily: Noctuoidea
- Family: Erebidae
- Subfamily: Arctiinae
- Genus: Lacydes
- Species: L. spectabilis

Binomial name
- Lacydes spectabilis (Tauscher, 1806)

Synonyms
- Noctua spectabilis Tauscher, 1806; Noctua spectabilis Tauscher, 1811; Diacrisia spectabilis; Bombyx intercissa Freyer, 1842; Eyprepia intercissa Freyer, 1842; Bombyx incisa Freyer, 1842; Eyprepia incissa Freyer, 1842; Arctia spectabilis var. annellata Christoph, 1887; Volgarctia kendevani Schwingenschuss, 1937; Lacydes spectabilis sheljuzhkoi Dubatolov, 1996

= Lacydes spectabilis =

Species of moth

Lacydes spectabilis is a moth of the family Erebidae. It was described by August Michael Tauscher in 1806. It is found in south-eastern Ukraine, eastern European Russia, western Siberia, Kazakhstan, Central Asia, Armenia, eastern Turkey, Turkmenistan, Afghanistan, China (Xinjiang) and southern Mongolia.

The wingspan is about 32 mm.

== Subspecies ==
- Lacydes spectabilis spectabilis (south-eastern Ukraine, eastern European Russia, western Siberia, Kazakhstan, Central Asia, Turkmenistan, Afghanistan, China: Xinjiang, southern Mongolia)
- Lacydes spectabilis annellata (Christoph, 1887) (Armenia, eastern Turkey, Kopet Dagh, Great Balkhan Mountains, Elburz Mountains)
