= Aglaomorpha =

Aglaomorpha is the generic name of two groups of organisms. It can refer to:

- Aglaomorpha (moth), a genus of moths in the family Erebidae
- Aglaomorpha (plant), a genus of ferns in the family Polypodiaceae
