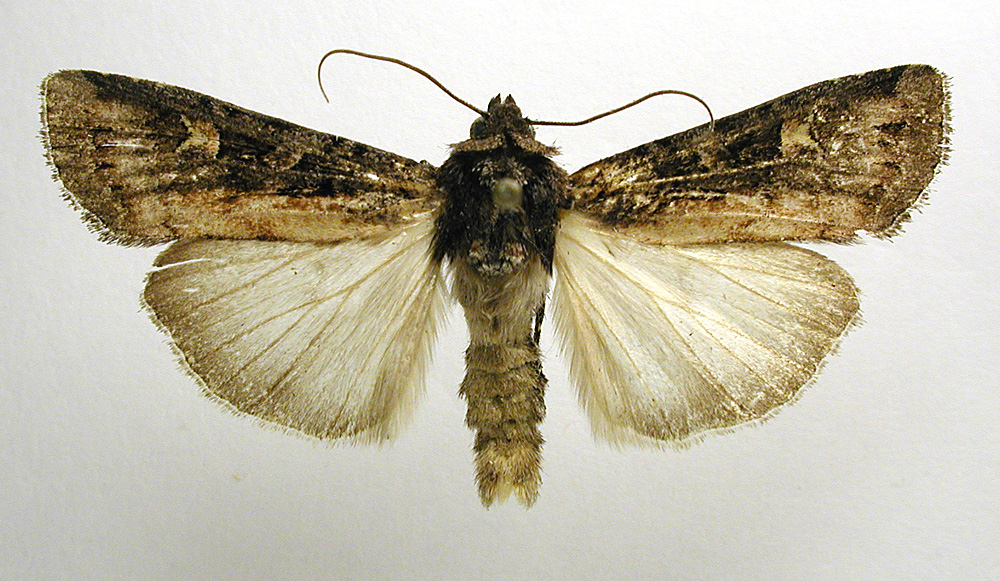

Scientific classification
- Kingdom: Animalia
- Phylum: Arthropoda
- Clade: Pancrustacea
- Class: Insecta
- Order: Lepidoptera
- Superfamily: Noctuoidea
- Family: Noctuidae
- Genus: Actebia
- Species: A. fennica

Binomial name
- Actebia fennica (Tauscher, 1806)

Synonyms
- Noctua fennica; Actebia tauscheri; Actebia intracta; Actebia eversmanni; Actebia unicolor

= Actebia fennica =

Species of moth

Actebia fennica, the black army cutworm or Eversmann's rustic, is a moth of the family Noctuidae. The species was first described by August Michael Tauscher in 1806. It has a Holarctic distribution from Newfoundland through western Europe, Siberia, the Far East, Mongolia, northern China to Korea and Japan. In North America it is mainly found in the boreal region, south to New England, southern Montana and northern Oregon.

The wingspan is 39-42 mm and the typical length is ~23 mm. Adults are on wing from July to September depending on the location. There is one generation per year.

The larvae feed on Elymus arenarius, Rumex species (including Rumex acetosella), Atriplex species, Minuartia pebloides, Lathyrus maritimus, Salix species and Vaccinium uliginosum.
