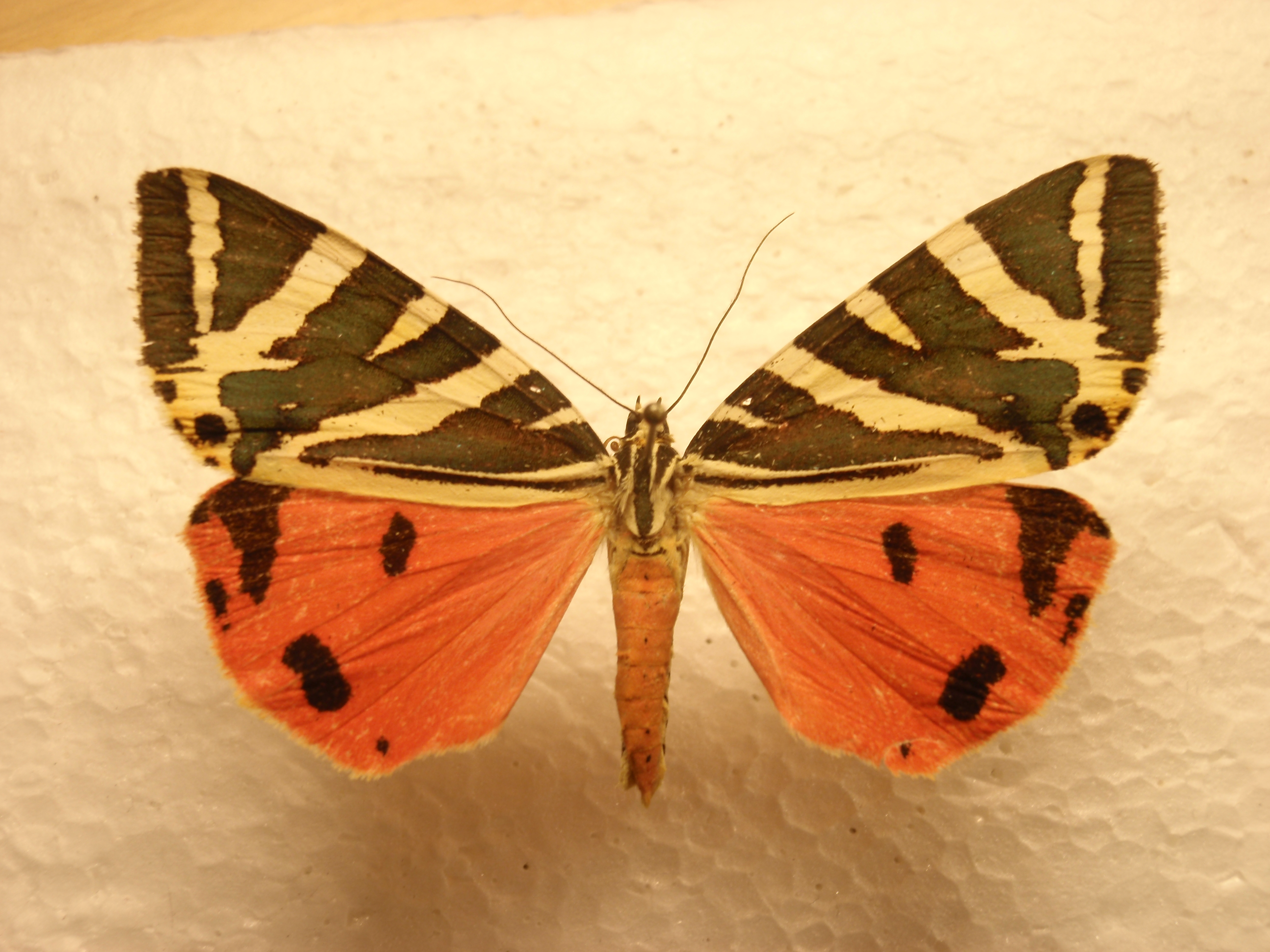

Scientific classification
- Kingdom: Animalia
- Phylum: Arthropoda
- Class: Insecta
- Order: Lepidoptera
- Superfamily: Noctuoidea
- Family: Erebidae
- Subfamily: Arctiinae
- Genus: Euplagia
- Species: E. splendidior

Binomial name
- Euplagia splendidior (Tams, 1922)

Synonyms
- Callimorpha splendidior Tams, 1922; Callimorpha quadripunctaria tkatshukovi Sheljuzhko, 1935

= Euplagia splendidior =

Species of moth

Euplagia splendidior is a moth of the family Erebidae described by Willie Horace Thomas Tams in 1922. It is found in Armenia, Nakhichevan, eastern Turkey and northern Iraq (the Zagros Mountains).
