= Nikaea longipennis =

Scientific classification
- Kingdom: Animalia
- Phylum: Arthropoda
- Class: Insecta
- Order: Lepidoptera
- Superfamily: Noctuoidea
- Family: Erebidae
- Subfamily: Arctiinae
- Genus: Nikaea
- Species: N. longipennis

Binomial name
- Nikaea longipennis (Walker, 1855)

Synonyms
- Hypercompa longipennis Walker, 1855

Species of moth

Nikaea longipennis is a moth in the family Erebidae. It is found in Kumaon, Nepal, Sikkim, Assam and China (Sichuan, Yunnan, Shaanxi, Hubei, Jiangxi, Zhejiang, Fujian). The species was described by Francis Walker in 1855.
