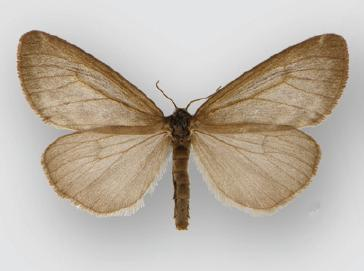

Conservation status
- Secure (NatureServe)

Scientific classification
- Domain: Eukaryota
- Kingdom: Animalia
- Phylum: Arthropoda
- Class: Insecta
- Order: Lepidoptera
- Superfamily: Noctuoidea
- Family: Erebidae
- Subfamily: Arctiinae
- Genus: Dodia
- Species: D. albertae

Binomial name
- Dodia albertae Dyar, 1901

Synonyms
- Hypocrita atra Bang-Haas, 1912; Hyperborea kozhantshikovi Sheljuzhko, 1918

= Dodia albertae =

Species of moth

Dodia albertae is a moth of the family Erebidae. It was described by Harrison Gray Dyar Jr. in 1901. It is found in Canada, Alaska, Siberia west to the Urals, and Mongolia.

The wingspan is about 30 millimetres (1.2 in). Adults are on wing from June to July. It occurs in wet subarctic and subalpine tundra and boreal peat bog habitats.

== Subspecies ==
There are three subspecies:

- Dodia albertae albertae – North America and Asia
- Dodia albertae atra (Bang-Haas, 1912) – Asia
- Dodia albertae eudiopta Tshistjakov, 1988 – Asia
