= Tinoliodes benguetensis =

Scientific classification
- Domain: Eukaryota
- Kingdom: Animalia
- Phylum: Arthropoda
- Class: Insecta
- Order: Lepidoptera
- Superfamily: Noctuoidea
- Family: Erebidae
- Subfamily: Arctiinae
- Genus: Tinoliodes
- Species: T. benguetensis

Binomial name
- Tinoliodes benguetensis Wileman, 1915

Species of moth

Tinoliodes benguetensis is a moth in the family Erebidae. It was described by Alfred Ernest Wileman in 1915. It is found in the Philippines.
