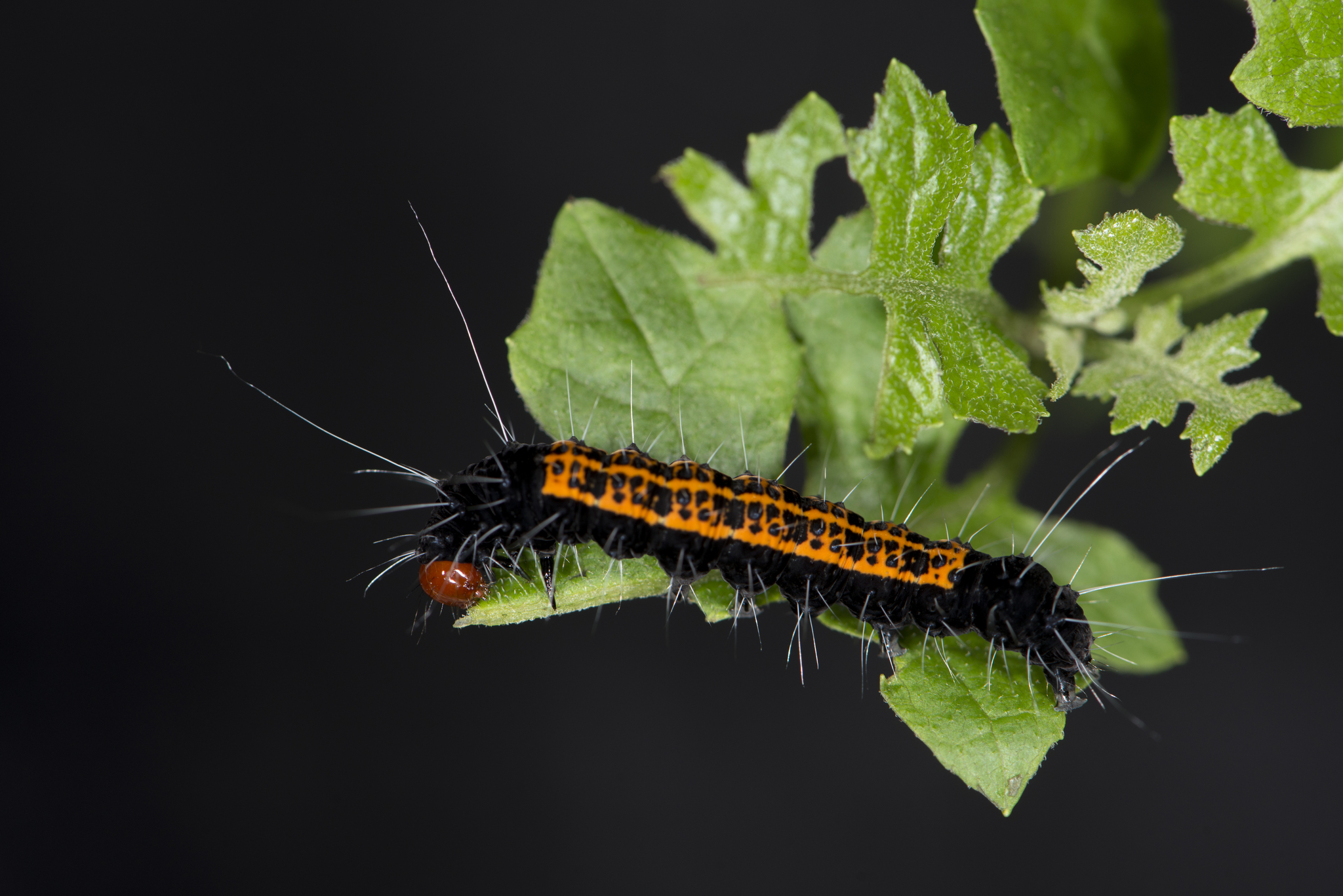

Scientific classification
- Domain: Eukaryota
- Kingdom: Animalia
- Phylum: Arthropoda
- Class: Insecta
- Order: Lepidoptera
- Superfamily: Noctuoidea
- Family: Erebidae
- Subfamily: Arctiinae
- Genus: Nikaea
- Species: N. matsumurai

Binomial name
- Nikaea matsumurai Kishida, 1983

Synonyms
- Nikaea longipennis matsumurai Kishida, 1983; Nikaea longipennis formosana Matsumura, 1930 (preocc. Miyake, 1907)

= Nikaea matsumurai =

Species of moth

Nikaea matsumurai is a moth in the family Erebidae first described by Yasunori Kishida in 1983. It is found in Taiwan and the Ryukyu Islands in Japan.
