= Tinoliodes dehanna =

Scientific classification
- Domain: Eukaryota
- Kingdom: Animalia
- Phylum: Arthropoda
- Class: Insecta
- Order: Lepidoptera
- Superfamily: Noctuoidea
- Family: Erebidae
- Subfamily: Arctiinae
- Genus: Tinoliodes
- Species: T. dehanna

Binomial name
- Tinoliodes dehanna (Pagenstecher, 1885)

Synonyms
- Arctia dehanna Pagenstecher, 1885; Niasana dehanna ruberrima Roepke, 1937; Niasana dehanna javana Roepke, 1937; Niasana dehanna borneana Roepke, 1937

Species of moth

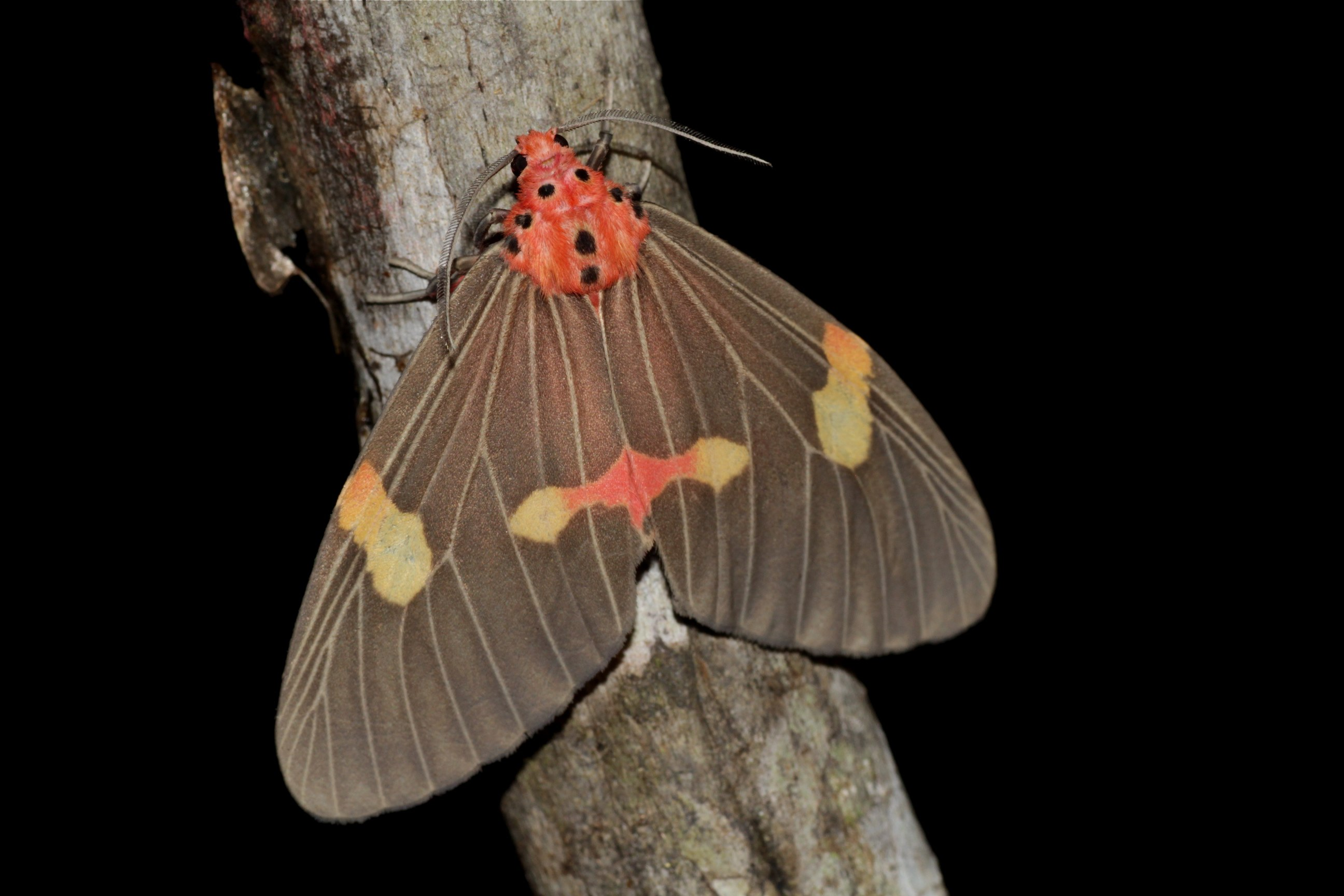
A specimen of Tinoliodes dehanna

Tinoliodes dehanna is a moth in the family Erebidae. It was described by Arnold Pagenstecher in 1885. It is found in Sundaland in Southeastern Asia. The habitat consists of rain forests from the lowlands up to 1.500 meters.
