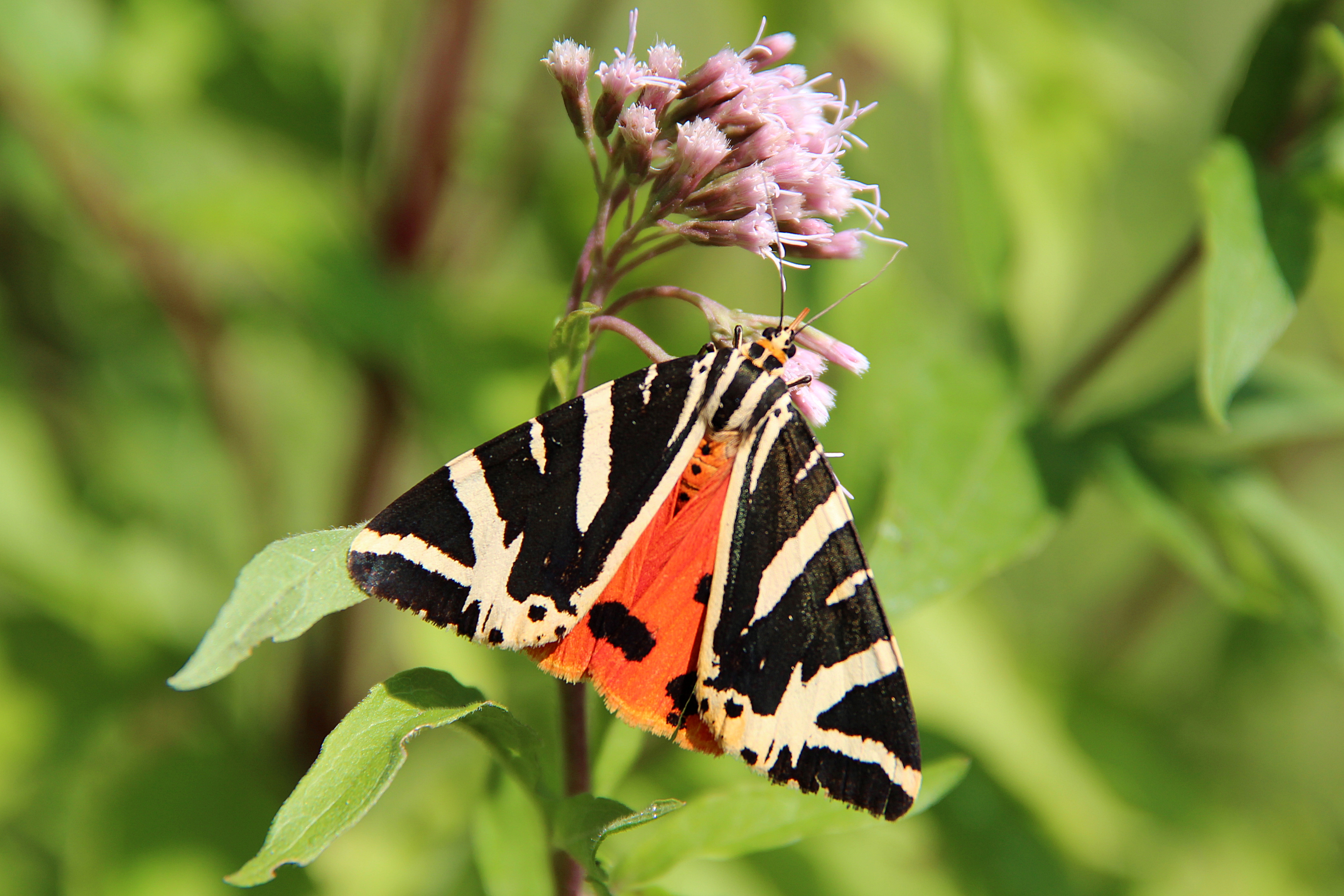
- Red form
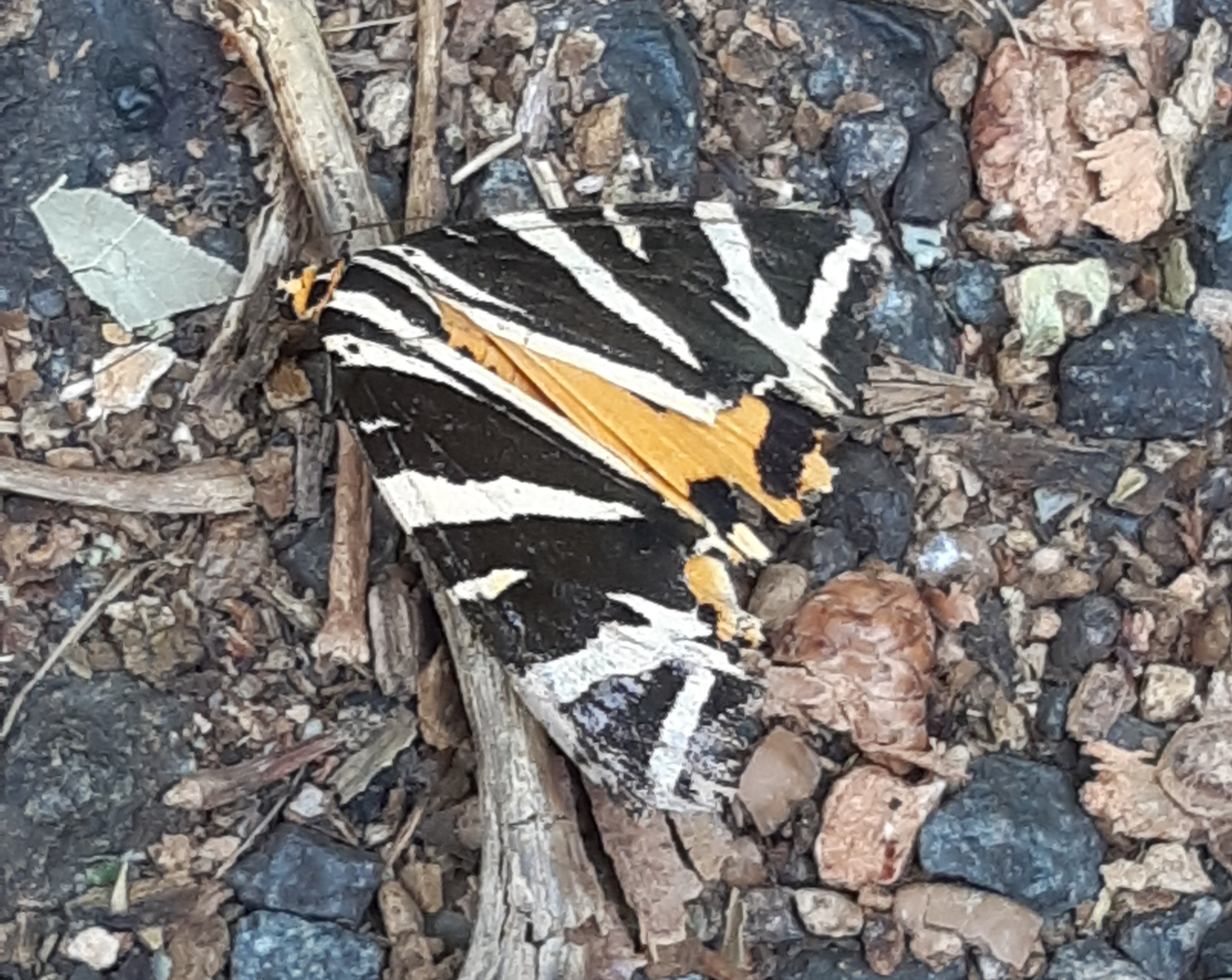
- Yellow form

Scientific classification
- Kingdom: Animalia
- Phylum: Arthropoda
- Clade: Pancrustacea
- Class: Insecta
- Order: Lepidoptera
- Superfamily: Noctuoidea
- Family: Erebidae
- Subfamily: Arctiinae
- Genus: Euplagia
- Species: E. quadripunctaria

Binomial name
- Euplagia quadripunctaria (Poda, 1761)

Synonyms
- Phalaena quadripunctaria Poda, 1761; Phalaena hera Linnaeus, 1767; Callimorpha quadripunctaria (Poda, 1761); Callimorpha hera (Linnaeus, 1767)

= Euplagia quadripunctaria =

Jersey tiger

Species of moth

Euplagia quadripunctaria, the Jersey tiger, or Spanish flag, is a diurnal moth of the family Erebidae. The species was first described by Nikolaus Poda von Neuhaus in 1761. The adult wingspan is 52–65 millimetres (2.0–2.6 in), and they fly from July to September, depending on the location. They tend to fly close to hemp-agrimony, Eupatorium cannabinum. In most of their range, the aposematic adults have red underwings. In the northwest part of their range, the adults are polymorphic for underwing colour, being variously red, orange, or yellow.

The larvae (caterpillars) are polyphagous, feeding from September to May on nettles (Urtica), raspberries (Rubus), dandelion (Taraxacum), white deadnettle (Lamium), ground-ivy (Glechoma), groundsel (Senecio), plantain (Plantago), borage (Borago), lettuce (Lactuca), and hemp-agrimony (Eupratoria). The insect overwinters as a small larva.

Large groups of adults of subspecies E. q. rhodosensis can be found on occasion aestivating (sheltering from the summer heat) in Petaloudes, on Rhodes, in a place that has become known as the Valley of the Butterflies.

== Distribution ==
Euplagia quadripunctaria is widely distributed in Europe from Estonia and Latvia in the north, to France and southern Great Britain in the west, and the Mediterranean coast and islands in the south. It is also found in western Russia, the southern Urals, Asia Minor, Rhodes and nearby islands, the Near East, Caucasus, southern Turkmenistan, and Iran. Individuals are known to migrate northwards from their regular breeding grounds during the summer.

=== British Isles ===
Aside from being frequent in the Channel Islands (whence its common name comes), this species was rarely seen in the British Isles in Victorian times. In 1903, it was described by William Forsell Kirby as "a great rarity in the South of England, except one locality in Devonshire". Since then however it has spread more widely in Devon and Cornwall, and became more frequent in southern England by 2014, especially on the Isle of Wight, in northern Kent, and south London. By 2019, it was widespread and common across southern England, and with scattered records north to the Midlands and East Anglia. The increase has continued since then, with a 78% increase between 2024–2025 alone, and consolidation in East Anglia, the Midlands, and into South Wales.

== Subspecies ==
- Euplagia quadripunctaria quadripunctaria (Europe, Caucasus, Transcaucasus, northern Anatolia, northern Iran, southern Turkmenistan)
- Euplagia quadripunctaria fulgida (South Turkey, Syria, Lebanon)
- Euplagia quadripunctaria rhodosensis (Western Turkey and neighbouring islands of Greece)

== Polymorphism ==
The hindwings are bright red across most of the range of the species, but in the northwest of the range the species is polymorphic, with red, orange, or yellow hindwings. The colour is part of the species' warning coloration (aposematism), signalling to possible predators that the species is distasteful, in its case protected by harmful chemicals. It is unusual for such warning signals to vary, as a single pattern is most likely to be an effective deterrent.

The polymorphism is created by two genes. Each gene has two alternative forms (alleles), one dominant to the other. One of the genes is epistatic to the other. One gene gives red if the dominant allele R is present, else orange (if homozygous for the recessive allele r); the other gene gives yellow if homozygous for its recessive allele (yy), regardless of the alleles of the red gene. Thus the Y allele is required for red or orange to appear. The Y allele may enable metabolism of the yellow pigment to orange, which the R allele can then process further to give red, which would explain the epistasis.

== Conservation ==
The Jersey tiger is the only lepidopteran which has been designated as a 'priority species' under Annex II of the Habitats Directive in the European Union, as of 1992. This means that areas in which it occurs can be declared Special Areas of Conservation.

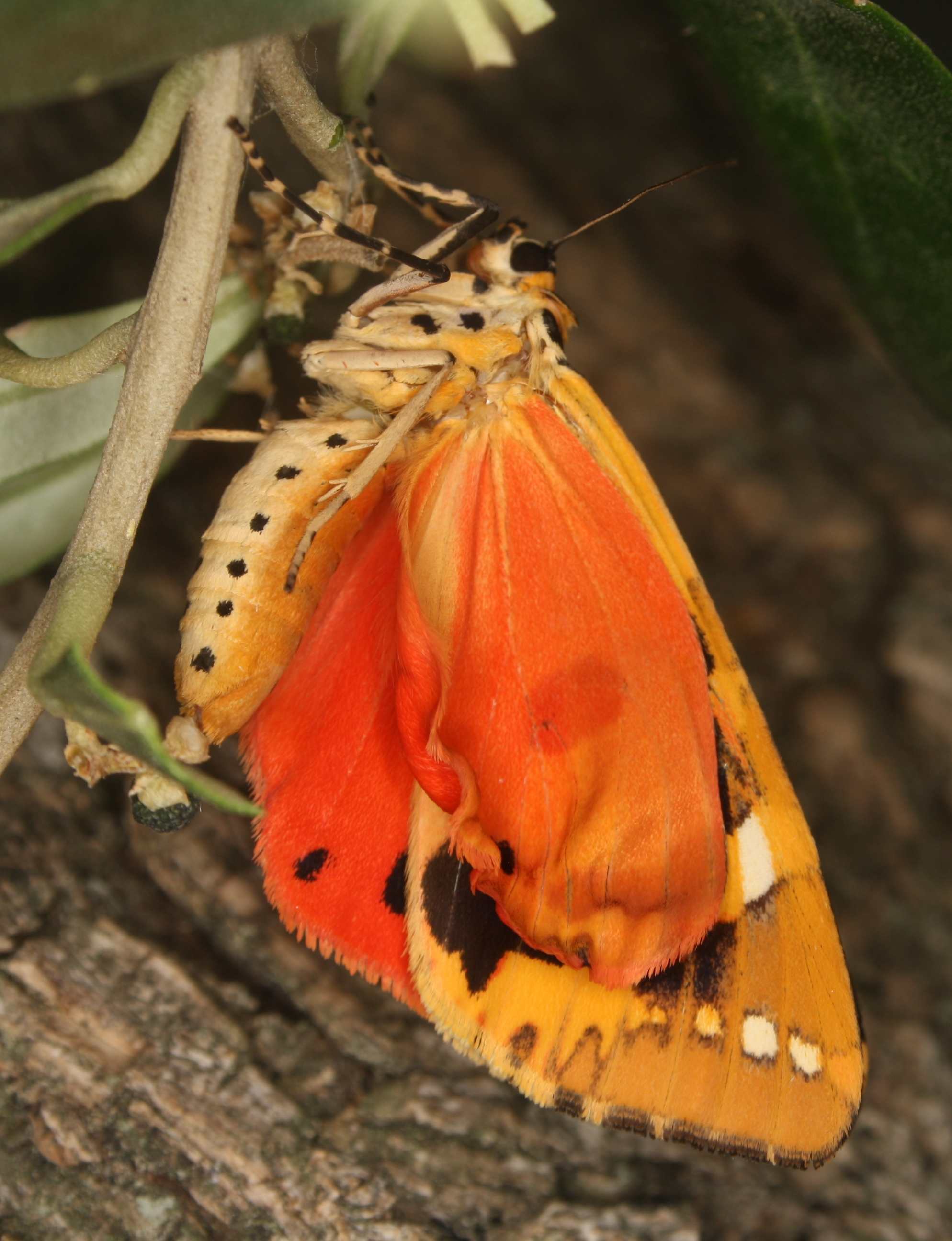
Red underwing on display

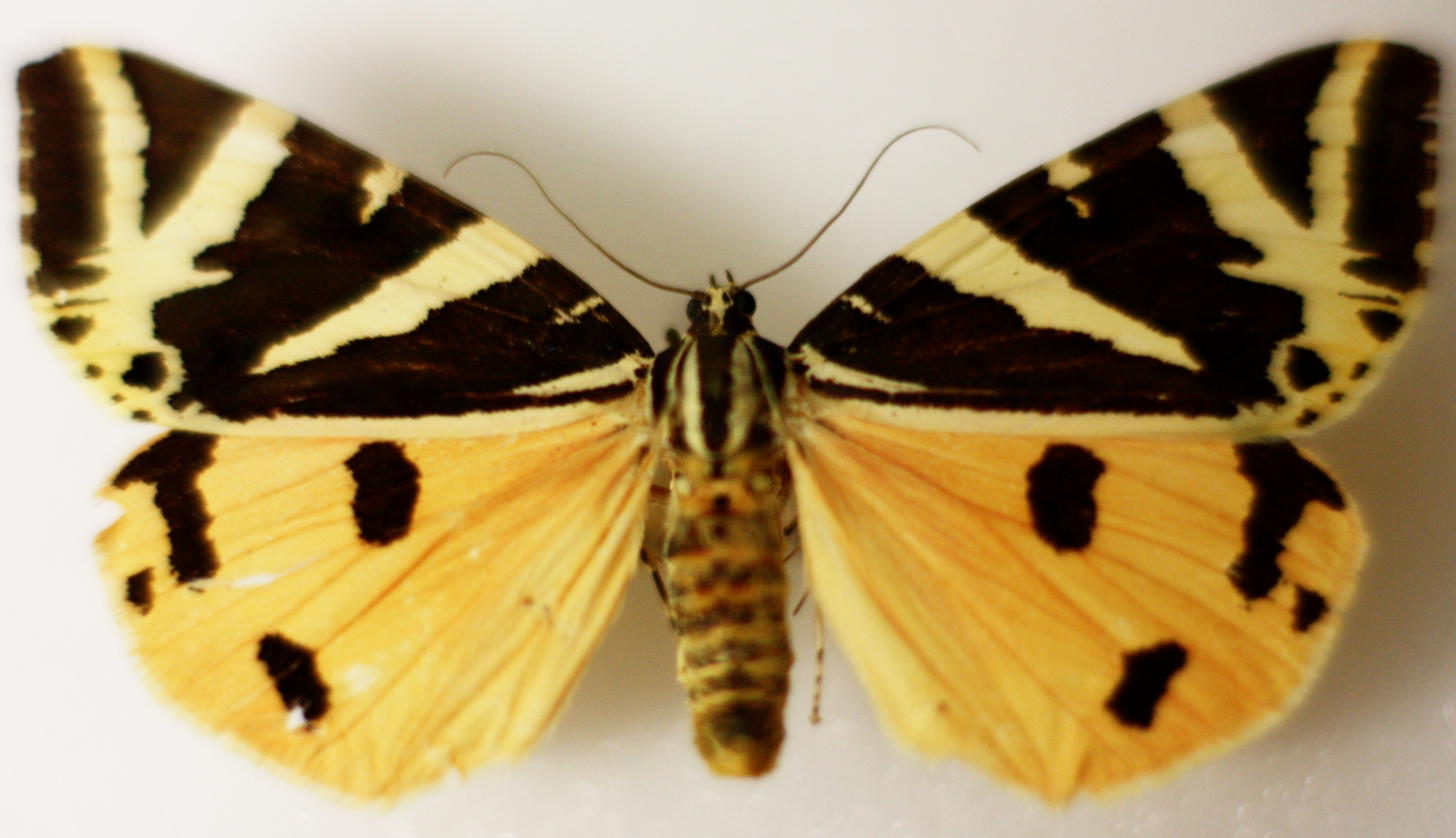
Variant with yellow hindwings. Museum specimen, Bremen

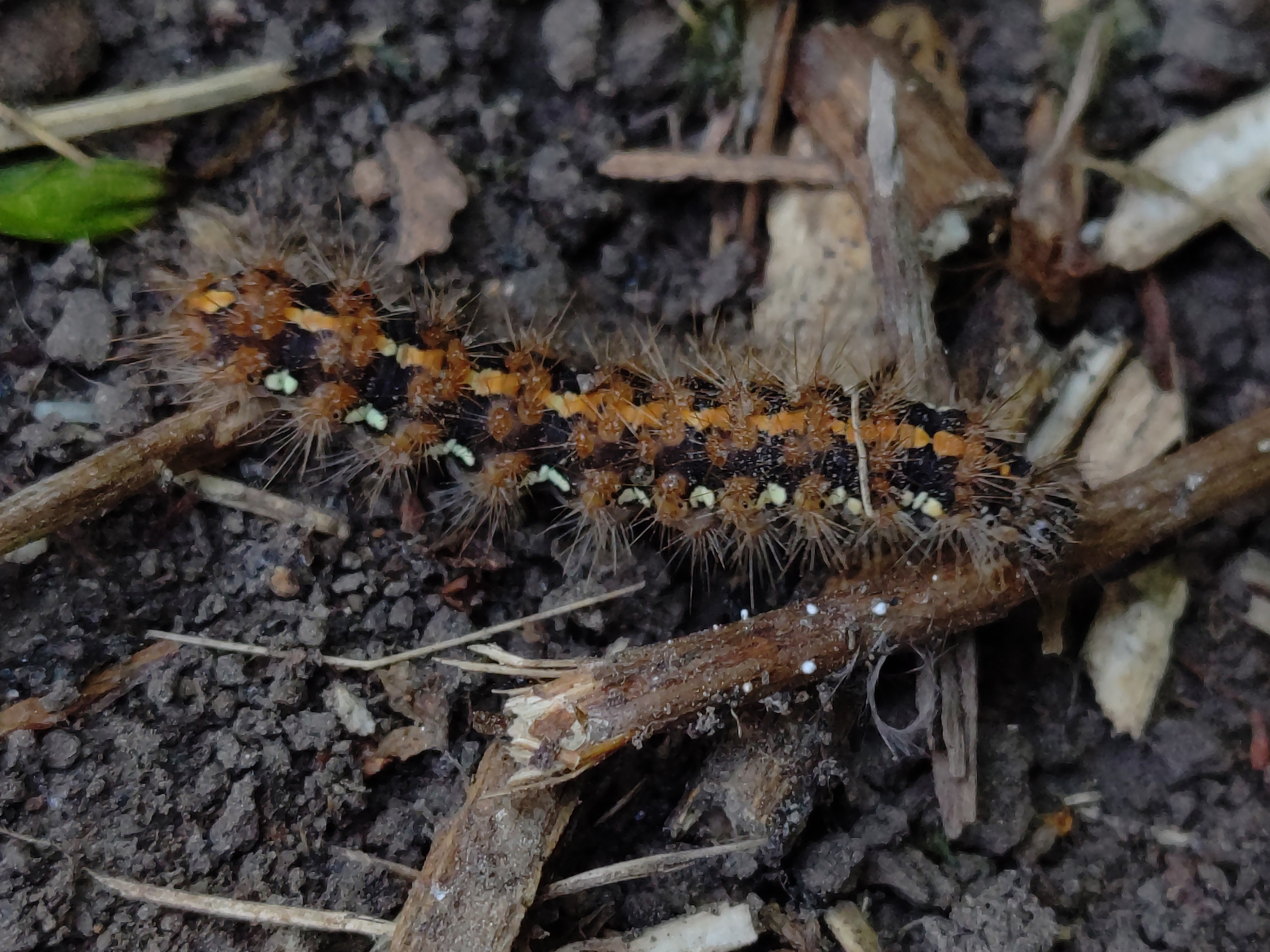
Caterpillar of E. q. quadripunctaria, Belgium

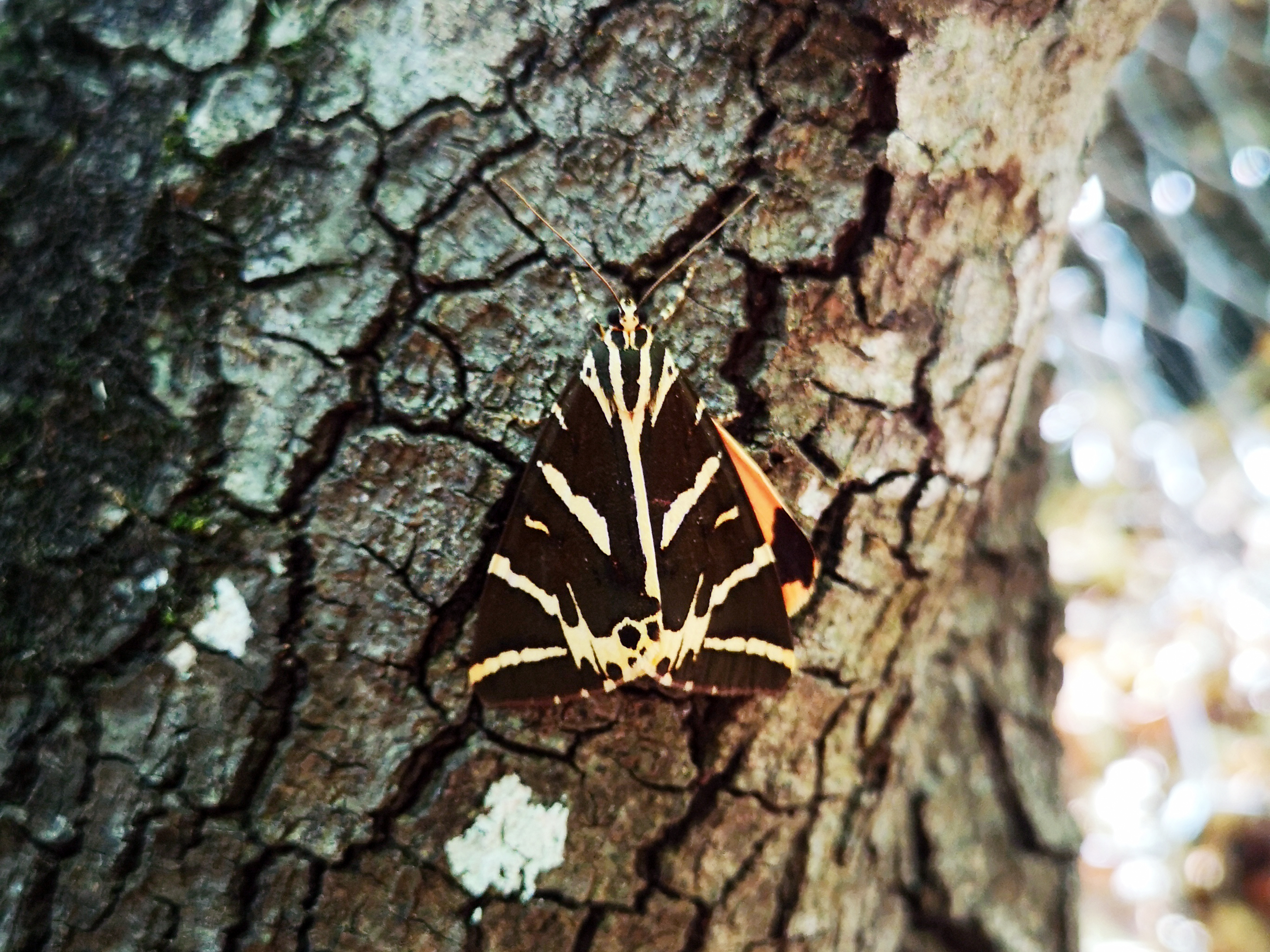
E. q. rhodosensis, Rhodes, Greece
