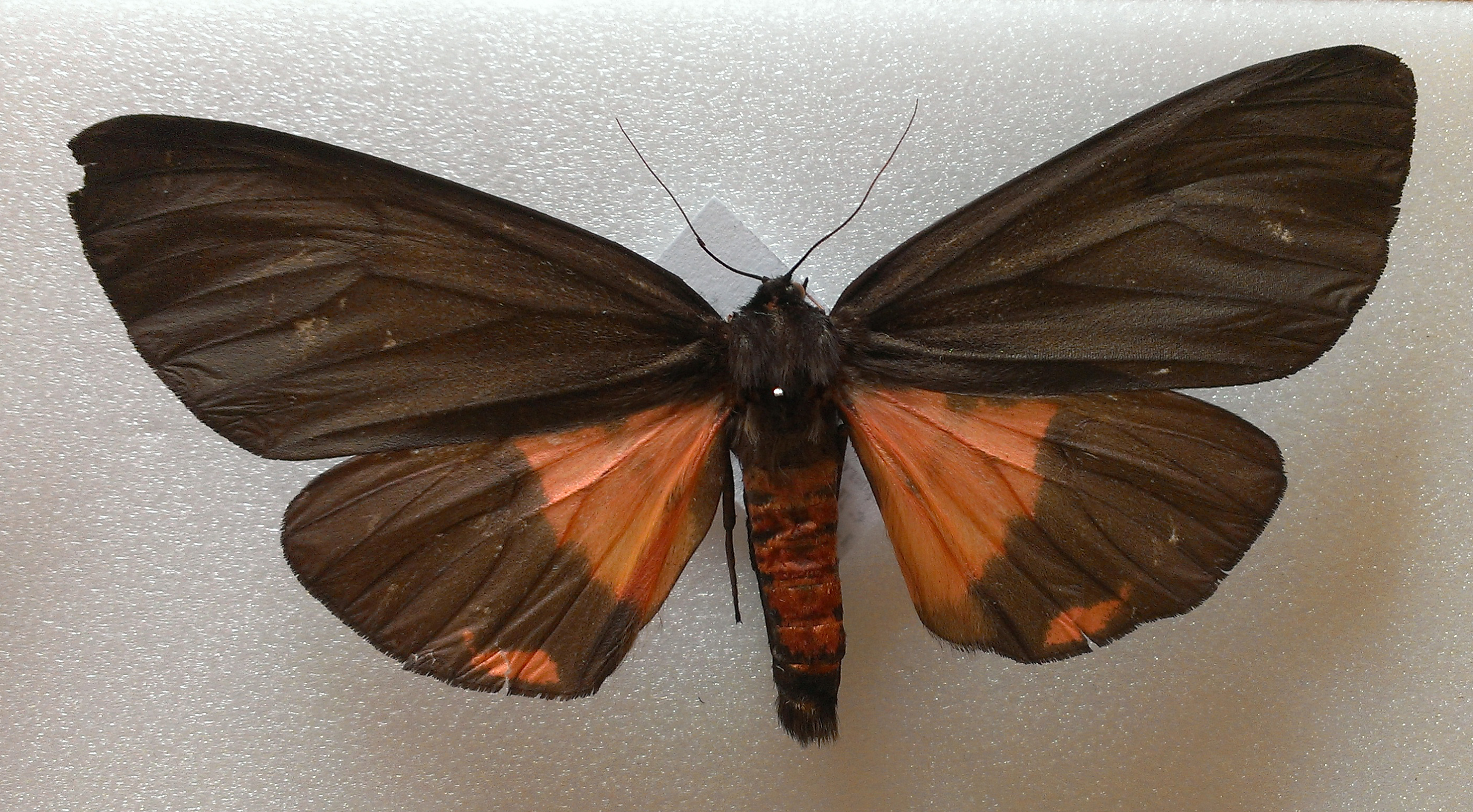

Scientific classification
- Domain: Eukaryota
- Kingdom: Animalia
- Phylum: Arthropoda
- Class: Insecta
- Order: Lepidoptera
- Superfamily: Noctuoidea
- Family: Erebidae
- Subfamily: Arctiinae
- Genus: Axiopoena
- Species: A. karelini

Binomial name
- Axiopoena karelini Ménétriés, 1863

Synonyms
- Axiopoena maura transcaucasica Sheljuzhko, 1926; Axiopoena maura manissadjiani O.Bang-Haas, 1927

= Axiopoena karelini =

Species of moth

Axiopoena karelini is a moth of the family Erebidae. It was described by Édouard Ménétries in 1863. It is found in Sochi, Abkhazia, Georgia, Armenia, Azerbaijan, eastern Turkey and northern Iraq.
