= Spiris bipunctata =

Scientific classification
- Domain: Eukaryota
- Kingdom: Animalia
- Phylum: Arthropoda
- Class: Insecta
- Order: Lepidoptera
- Superfamily: Noctuoidea
- Family: Erebidae
- Subfamily: Arctiinae
- Genus: Spiris
- Species: S. bipunctata

Binomial name
- Spiris bipunctata (Staudinger, 1892)

Synonyms
- Emydia bipunctata Staudinger, 1892; Spiris bipunctata ab. nigrina Dubatolov, 1985

Species of moth

Spiris bipunctata is a moth in the family Erebidae. It was described by Otto Staudinger in 1892. It is found in Russia (western Sayan Mountains, southern Krasnoyarskii Krai, Tuva, Transbaikalia, Middle Amur), central and eastern Mongolia and China (Xinjiang, Qinghai, Shanxi, Heilongjiang).
