= Dodia verticalis =

Scientific classification
- Kingdom: Animalia
- Phylum: Arthropoda
- Clade: Pancrustacea
- Class: Insecta
- Order: Lepidoptera
- Superfamily: Noctuoidea
- Family: Erebidae
- Subfamily: Arctiinae
- Genus: Dodia
- Species: D. verticalis

Binomial name
- Dodia verticalis Lafontaine & Troubridge, [2000] 1999

Species of moth

Dodia verticalis is a moth of the family Erebidae. It was described by J. Donald Lafontaine and James T. Troubridge in 2000. It is found in Canada (Yukon). The habitat consists of dry, rocky tundra.

The forewings have dark transverse bands meeting at the posterior margin at right angles.
