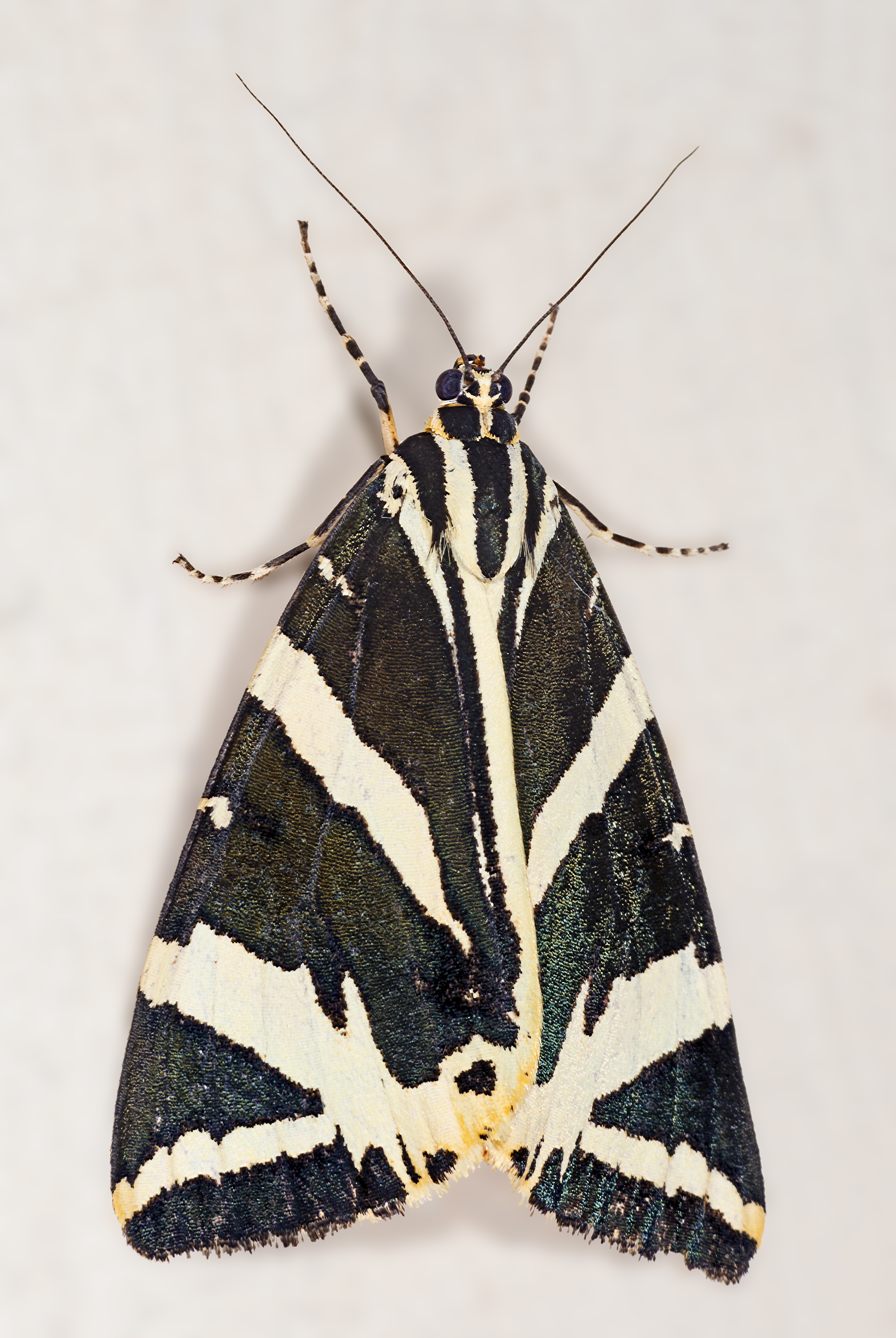
- Euplagia quadripunctaria

Scientific classification
- Kingdom: Animalia
- Phylum: Arthropoda
- Clade: Pancrustacea
- Class: Insecta
- Order: Lepidoptera
- Superfamily: Noctuoidea
- Family: Erebidae
- Subfamily: Arctiinae
- Subtribe: Callimorphina
- Genus: Euplagia; Hübner, 1820

= Euplagia =

Genus of moths

Euplagia is a genus of tiger moths in the family Erebidae. The genus was erected by Jacob Hübner in 1820.

== Species ==
- Euplagia quadripunctaria (Poda, 1761)
- Euplagia splendidior (Tams, 1922)
