= Dodia sazonovi =

Scientific classification
- Kingdom: Animalia
- Phylum: Arthropoda
- Clade: Pancrustacea
- Class: Insecta
- Order: Lepidoptera
- Superfamily: Noctuoidea
- Family: Erebidae
- Subfamily: Arctiinae
- Genus: Dodia
- Species: D. sazonovi

Binomial name
- Dodia sazonovi Dubatolov, 1990

Species of moth

Dodia sazonovi is a moth of the family Erebidae. It was described by Vladimir Viktorovitch Dubatolov in 1990. It is found in Russia (Aktash).
