= Dodia maja =

Scientific classification
- Domain: Eukaryota
- Kingdom: Animalia
- Phylum: Arthropoda
- Class: Insecta
- Order: Lepidoptera
- Superfamily: Noctuoidea
- Family: Erebidae
- Subfamily: Arctiinae
- Genus: Dodia
- Species: D. maja

Binomial name
- Dodia maja Rekelj & Česanek, 2009

Species of moth

Dodia maja is a moth of the family Erebidae. It was described by Jurij Rekelj and M. Česanek in 2009. It is found in the Russian Far East (Magadan territory). Adults are found from mid-June to early July.
