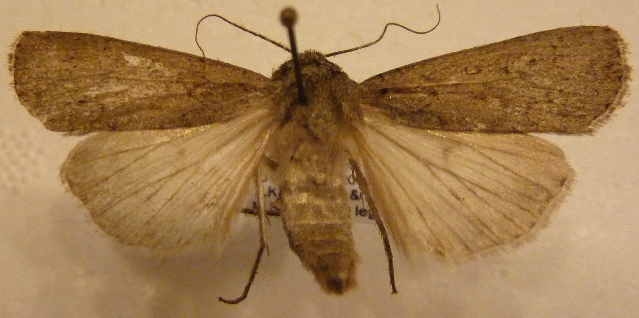

Scientific classification
- Kingdom: Animalia
- Phylum: Arthropoda
- Class: Insecta
- Order: Lepidoptera
- Superfamily: Noctuoidea
- Family: Noctuidae
- Genus: Actebia
- Species: A. squalida

Binomial name
- Actebia squalida (Guenée, 1852)

Synonyms
- Agrotis squalida Guenée, 1852; Protexarnis squalida (Guenée, 1852)

= Actebia squalida =

Species of moth

Actebia squalida is a moth of the family Noctuidae. It known from Finland, the southern Urals, and eastern Siberia.

It was previously thought to also occur in North America but this error comes from a misidentification of Actebia balanitis.

The larvae probably feed on various grasses.
