= Euleechia miranda =

Scientific classification
- Domain: Eukaryota
- Kingdom: Animalia
- Phylum: Arthropoda
- Class: Insecta
- Order: Lepidoptera
- Superfamily: Noctuoidea
- Family: Erebidae
- Subfamily: Arctiinae
- Genus: Euleechia
- Species: E. miranda

Binomial name
- Euleechia miranda (Oberthür, 1894)

Synonyms
- Chelonia miranda Oberthür, 1894; Spiris miranda; Chelonia miranda dubernardi Oberthür, 1912; Chelonia miranda lugens Oberthür, 1912

Species of moth

Euleechia miranda is a moth of the family Erebidae. It was described by Charles Oberthür in 1894. It is found in Tibet and Yunnan in China.
