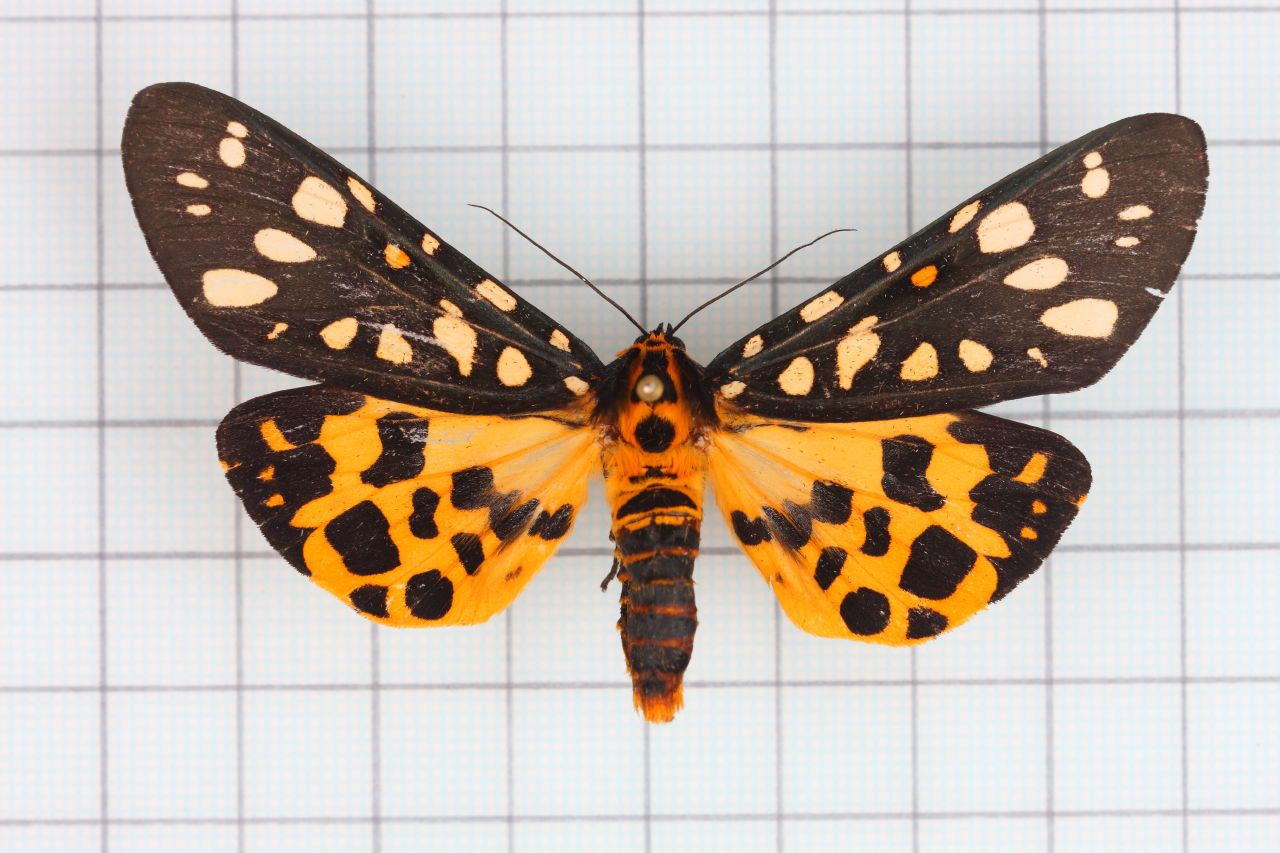
- Aglaomorpha histrio formosana mounted
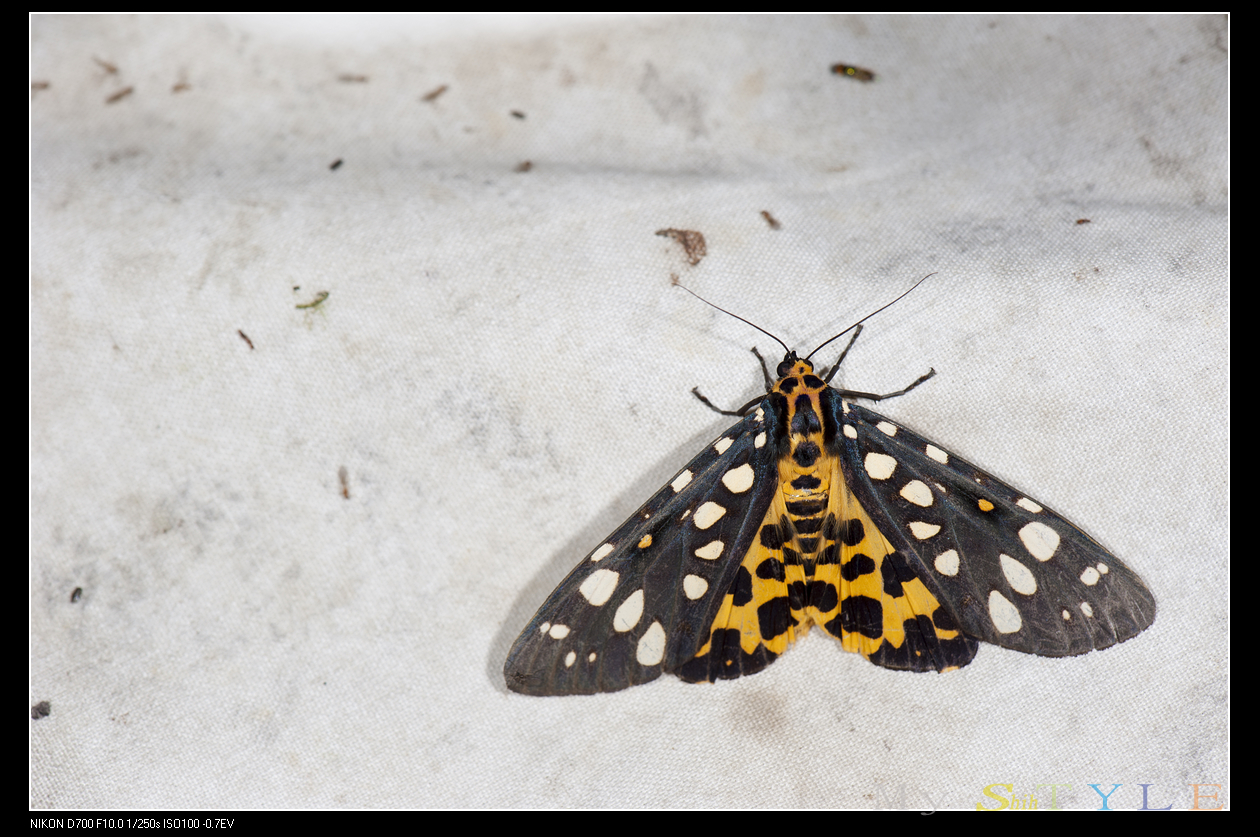
- Aglaomorpha histrio formosana

Scientific classification
- Kingdom: Animalia
- Phylum: Arthropoda
- Class: Insecta
- Order: Lepidoptera
- Superfamily: Noctuoidea
- Family: Erebidae
- Subfamily: Arctiinae
- Genus: Aglaomorpha
- Species: A. histrio

Binomial name
- Aglaomorpha histrio (Walker, 1855)

Synonyms
- Hypercompa histrio Walker, 1855; Nicaea arisana Matsumura, 1911; Callimorpha coreana Matsumura, 1927; Callimorpha histrio chosensis Bryk, 1948

= Aglaomorpha histrio =

Species of moth

Aglaomorpha histrio is a species of moth in the family Erebidae first described by Francis Walker in 1855. It is found in Korea, Japan, China and Taiwan.

The wingspan is 72–94 mm.

== Subspecies ==
- Aglaomorpha histrio histrio - Japan, China: Shanghai, Zhejiang, Jiangsu, Fujian, Jiangsi, Hunan, Hubei, Sichuan, Yunnan
- Aglaomorpha histrio coreana (Matsumura, 1927) - Korea
- Aglaomorpha histrio formosana (Miyake, 1907) - Taiwan
