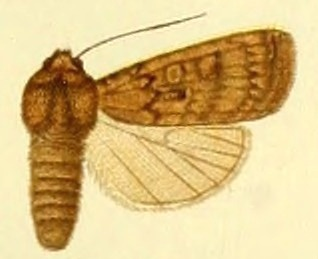

Scientific classification
- Kingdom: Animalia
- Phylum: Arthropoda
- Class: Insecta
- Order: Lepidoptera
- Superfamily: Noctuoidea
- Family: Noctuidae
- Genus: Actebia
- Species: A. opisoleuca

Binomial name
- Actebia opisoleuca (Staudinger, 1881)

Synonyms
- Protexarnis opisoleuca (Staudinger, 1881); Opigena opisoleuca (Staudinger, 1881); Agrotis opisoleuca Staudinger, 1881; Euxoa opisoleuca (Staudinger, 1881)

= Actebia opisoleuca =

Species of moth

Actebia opisoleuca is a moth of the family Noctuidae. It is found in Turkey.
