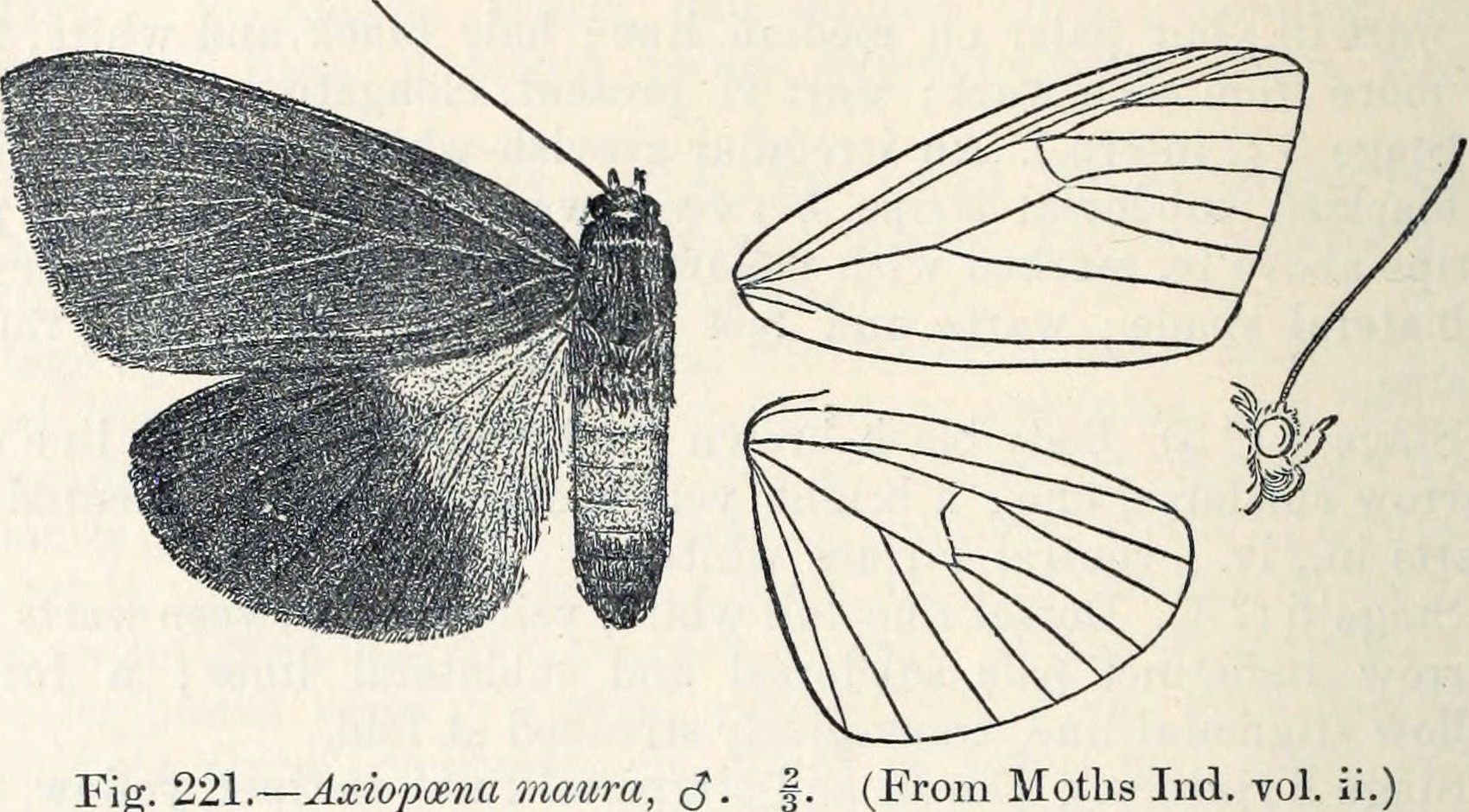
- Axiopoena maura

Scientific classification
- Domain: Eukaryota
- Kingdom: Animalia
- Phylum: Arthropoda
- Class: Insecta
- Order: Lepidoptera
- Superfamily: Noctuoidea
- Family: Erebidae
- Subfamily: Arctiinae
- Genus: Axiopoena
- Species: A. maura

Binomial name
- Axiopoena maura (Eichwald, 1830)

Synonyms
- Bombyx maura Eichwald, 1830; Axiopoena fluviatilis Swinhoe, 1885

= Axiopoena maura =

Species of moth

Axiopoena maura is a moth of the family Erebidae. It was described by Karl Eichwald in 1830. It is found in Azerbaijan, Turkmenistan, Iran, Afghanistan and northern Pakistan.
