= Euleechia =

Scientific classification
- Kingdom: Animalia
- Phylum: Arthropoda
- Class: Insecta
- Order: Lepidoptera
- Superfamily: Noctuoidea
- Family: Erebidae
- Subfamily: Arctiinae
- Subtribe: Callimorphina
- Genus: Euleechia; Dyar, 1900

Synonyms
- Callarctia Leech, 1899; Neochelonia Draeseke, 1926; Nikaeoides Matsumura, 1931

Genus of moths

Euleechia is a genus of tiger moths in the family Erebidae erected by Harrison Gray Dyar Jr. in 1900.

== Species ==
- Euleechia bieti (Oberthür, 1883)
- Euleechia miranda (Oberthür, 1894)
- Euleechia pratti (Leech, 1890)
