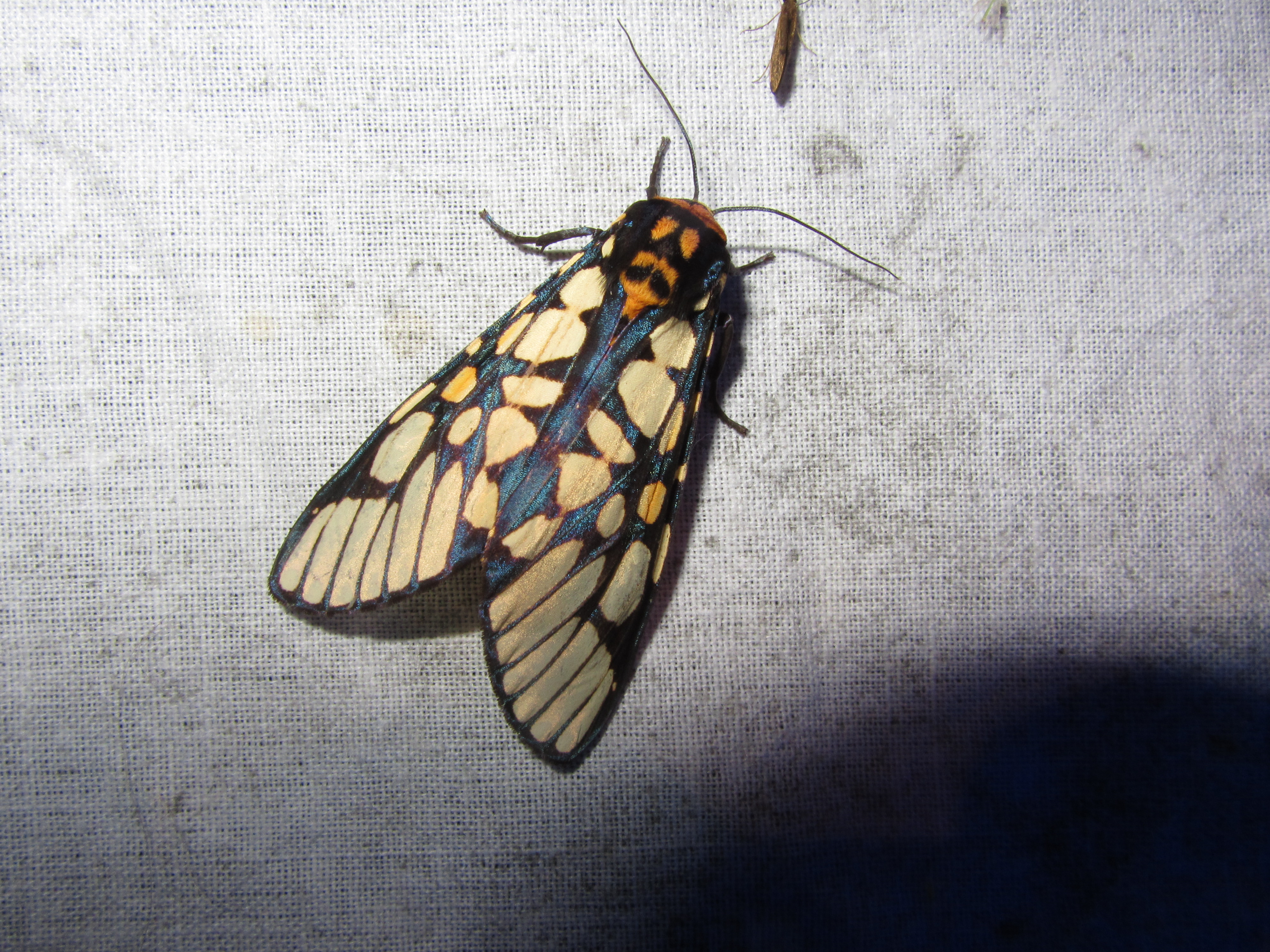

Scientific classification
- Kingdom: Animalia
- Phylum: Arthropoda
- Class: Insecta
- Order: Lepidoptera
- Superfamily: Noctuoidea
- Family: Erebidae
- Subfamily: Arctiinae
- Genus: Aglaomorpha
- Species: A. plagiata

Binomial name
- Aglaomorpha plagiata (Walker, 1855)

Synonyms
- Hypercompa plagiata Walker, 1855

= Aglaomorpha plagiata =

Species of moth

Aglaomorpha plagiata is a moth of the family Erebidae. It was described by Francis Walker in 1855. It is found in China (Yunnan), India (Himachal, Kashmir), Nepal, Bangladesh and Myanmar.
