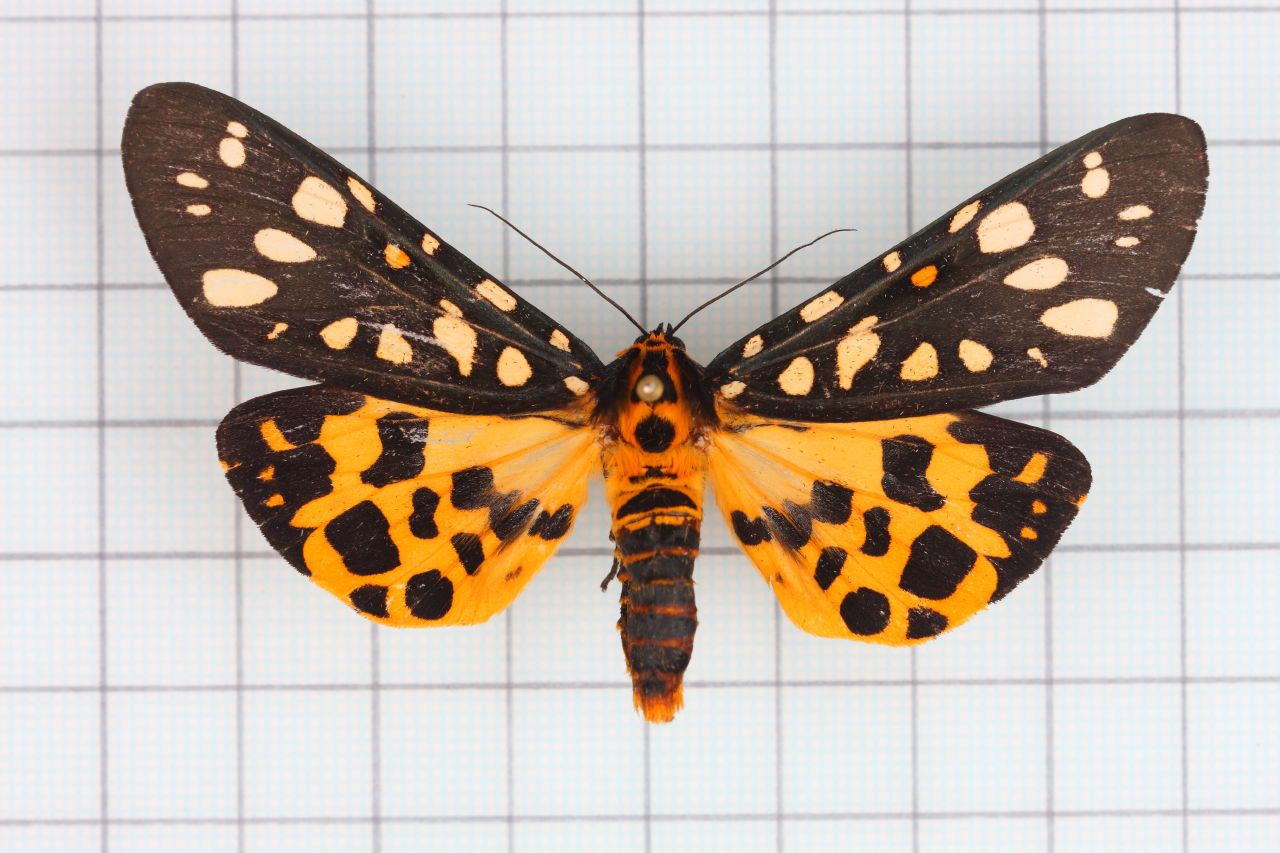
- Aglaomorpha histrio formosana

Scientific classification
- Kingdom: Animalia
- Phylum: Arthropoda
- Clade: Pancrustacea
- Class: Insecta
- Order: Lepidoptera
- Superfamily: Noctuoidea
- Family: Erebidae
- Subfamily: Arctiinae
- Subtribe: Callimorphina
- Genus: Aglaomorpha; Kôda, 1988

Type species
- Hypercompa histrio Walker, 1855

Synonyms
- Neocallimorpha Dubatolov, 1990

= Aglaomorpha (moth) =

Genus of moths

Aglaomorpha is a genus of tiger moths in the family Erebidae.

== Species ==
The genus consists of the following species:

- Aglaomorpha histrio (Walker, 1855) - contains three subspecies. Found in China and possibly also in the Korean Peninsula and Taiwan.
- Aglaomorpha plagiata (Walker, 1855) - Found in southwestern China, northern Indochina, and the Himalayas.

== See also ==
- Callimorpha
- Calpenia
