= Euleechia bieti =

Scientific classification
- Domain: Eukaryota
- Kingdom: Animalia
- Phylum: Arthropoda
- Class: Insecta
- Order: Lepidoptera
- Superfamily: Noctuoidea
- Family: Erebidae
- Subfamily: Arctiinae
- Genus: Euleechia
- Species: E. bieti

Binomial name
- Euleechia bieti (Oberthür, 1883)

Synonyms
- Chelonia bieti Oberthür, 1883; Neochelonia bieti; Neochelonia bieti hoenei O. Bang-Haas, 1933; Neochelonia bieti minschani O. Bang-Haas, 1933

Species of moth

Euleechia bieti is a moth of the family Erebidae. It was described by Charles Oberthür in 1883. It is found in China.

== Subspecies ==
- Euleechia bieti bieti (China: Sichuan, Shanxi)
- Euleechia bieti hoenei (O. Bang-Haas, 1932) (China: Zhejiang)
- Euleechia bieti minschani (O. Bang-Haas, 1932) (China: Gansu, Hebei)
