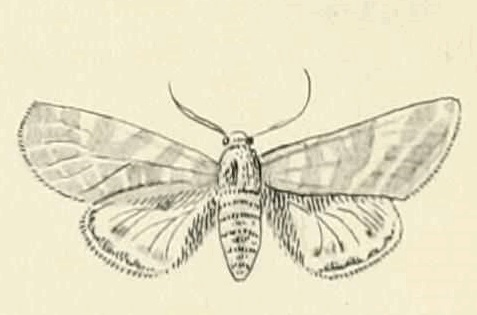

Scientific classification
- Domain: Eukaryota
- Kingdom: Animalia
- Phylum: Arthropoda
- Class: Insecta
- Order: Lepidoptera
- Superfamily: Noctuoidea
- Family: Erebidae
- Subfamily: Arctiinae
- Subtribe: Callimorphina
- Genus: Lacydes; Walker, 1855

Synonyms
- Acymba Rambur, [1866]; Palparctia Spuler, 1906; Volgarctia Alphéraky, 1908

= Lacydes (moth) =

Genus of moths

Lacydes is a genus of tiger moths in the family Erebidae erected by Francis Walker in 1855.

== Species ==
- Lacydes spectabilis (Tauscher, 1806)
- Lacydes incurvata Ebert, 1973
