= Calpenia =

Scientific classification
- Domain: Eukaryota
- Kingdom: Animalia
- Phylum: Arthropoda
- Class: Insecta
- Order: Lepidoptera
- Superfamily: Noctuoidea
- Family: Erebidae
- Subfamily: Arctiinae
- Subtribe: Callimorphina
- Genus: Calpenia; Moore, 1872

Synonyms
- Euprepia Oberthür, 1886

Genus of moths

Calpenia is a genus of tiger moths in the family Erebidae. The genus was erected by Frederic Moore in 1872.

== Species ==
There are two recognized species:

- Calpenia monilifera Oberthür, 1903
- Calpenia saundersi Moore, 1872

== Taxonomy ==
Calpenia khasiana, Calpenia takamukui and Calpenia zerenaria have been reclassified to the genus Kishidaria.
