= Tinoliodes =

Scientific classification
- Domain: Eukaryota
- Kingdom: Animalia
- Phylum: Arthropoda
- Class: Insecta
- Order: Lepidoptera
- Superfamily: Noctuoidea
- Family: Erebidae
- Subfamily: Arctiinae
- Subtribe: Callimorphina
- Genus: Tinoliodes; Wileman, 1915

Synonyms
- Niasana Roepke, 1937

Genus of moths

Tinoliodes is a genus of tiger moths in the family Erebidae described by Wileman in 1915.

== Species ==
- Tinoliodes benguetensis Wileman, 1915
- Tinoliodes dehanna (Pagenstecher, 1885)
