= Euleechia pratti =

Scientific classification
- Domain: Eukaryota
- Kingdom: Animalia
- Phylum: Arthropoda
- Class: Insecta
- Order: Lepidoptera
- Superfamily: Noctuoidea
- Family: Erebidae
- Subfamily: Arctiinae
- Genus: Euleechia
- Species: E. pratti

Binomial name
- Euleechia pratti (Leech, 1890)

Synonyms
- Chelonia bieti var. pratti Leech, 1890; Chelonia poultoni Oberthür, 1913; Euleechia poultoni

Species of moth

Euleechia pratti is a moth of the family Erebidae. It was described by John Henry Leech in 1890. It is found in the Chinese provinces of Sichuan, Zhejiang, Jiangxi, Hubei and Yunnan.
