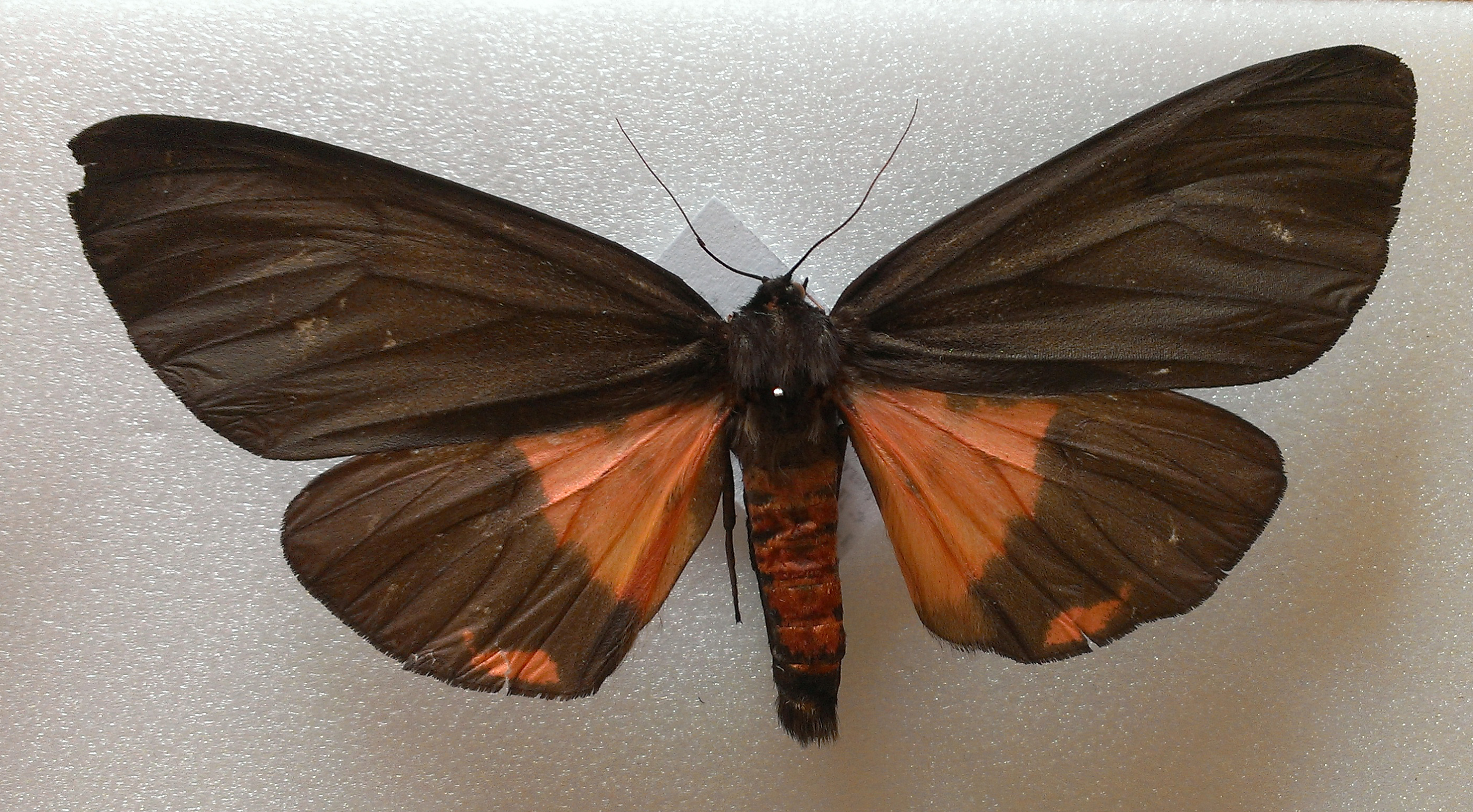
- Axiopoena karelini

Scientific classification
- Domain: Eukaryota
- Kingdom: Animalia
- Phylum: Arthropoda
- Class: Insecta
- Order: Lepidoptera
- Superfamily: Noctuoidea
- Family: Erebidae
- Subfamily: Arctiinae
- Subtribe: Callimorphina
- Genus: Axiopoena; Ménétriés, 1842

= Axiopoena =

Genus of moths

Axiopoena is a genus of tiger moths in the family Erebidae. The genus was erected by Ménétriés in 1842.

== Species ==
The genus consists of the following species:

- Axiopoena maura (Eichwald, 1830)
- Axiopoena karelini Ménétriés, 1863
