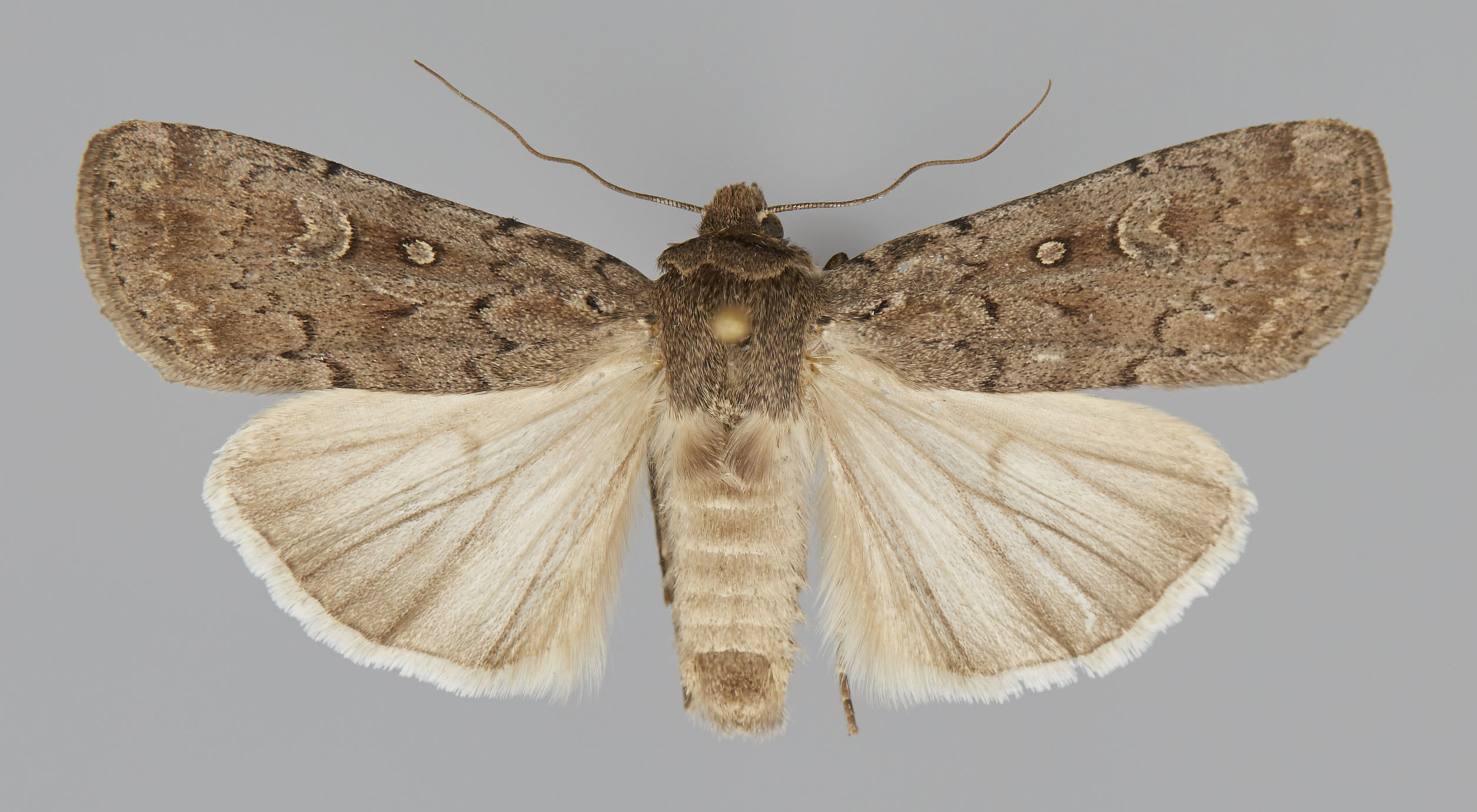

Scientific classification
- Domain: Eukaryota
- Kingdom: Animalia
- Phylum: Arthropoda
- Class: Insecta
- Order: Lepidoptera
- Superfamily: Noctuoidea
- Family: Noctuidae
- Genus: Actebia
- Species: A. balanitis

Binomial name
- Actebia balanitis (Grote, 1873)

Synonyms
- Protexarnis balanitis Grote, 1873

= Actebia balanitis =

Species of moth

Actebia balanitis, commonly known as cutworm moth, and bracketed dart moth, is a species of moth in the family Noctuidae that was first described by Augustus Radcliffe Grote in 1873.

It is found across North America from north-east Alaska and western Yukon east to east central Saskatchewan and north central South Dakota, south to northern Colorado and west to central Washington and the dry interior of British Columbia. It has also been founded in the northern parts of North Dakota. It is also a native species across Idaho.

The wingspan is 36–40 mm. Adults are on wing from June to August depending on the location. There is one generation per year.

This species has previously been confused with the Palearctic species Actebia squalida, which led to A. squalida to be misreported from North America.

The larvae probably feed on various grasses.
