= Calpenia saundersi =

Scientific classification
- Domain: Eukaryota
- Kingdom: Animalia
- Phylum: Arthropoda
- Class: Insecta
- Order: Lepidoptera
- Superfamily: Noctuoidea
- Family: Erebidae
- Subfamily: Arctiinae
- Genus: Calpenia
- Species: C. saundersi

Binomial name
- Calpenia saundersi Moore, 1872

Species of moth

Calpenia saundersi is a tiger moth in the family Erebidae first described by Frederic Moore in 1872. It is found in India and in Yunnan, southwestern China.
