= Lacydes incurvata =

Scientific classification
- Domain: Eukaryota
- Kingdom: Animalia
- Phylum: Arthropoda
- Class: Insecta
- Order: Lepidoptera
- Superfamily: Noctuoidea
- Family: Erebidae
- Subfamily: Arctiinae
- Genus: Lacydes
- Species: L. incurvata

Binomial name
- Lacydes incurvata Ebert, 1973

Species of moth

Lacydes incurvata is a moth of the family Erebidae. It was described by G. Ebert in 1973. It is found in Afghanistan.
