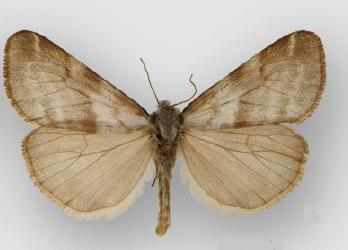
- Holotype (male)

Conservation status
- Vulnerable (NatureServe)

Scientific classification
- Domain: Eukaryota
- Kingdom: Animalia
- Phylum: Arthropoda
- Class: Insecta
- Order: Lepidoptera
- Superfamily: Noctuoidea
- Family: Erebidae
- Subfamily: Arctiinae
- Genus: Dodia
- Species: D. tarandus

Binomial name
- Dodia tarandus Macaulay & Schmidt, 2009

= Dodia tarandus =

Species of moth

Dodia tarandus is a moth of the family Erebidae. It is endemic to Canada and found in boreal black spruce bogs and adjacent open pine uplands in central to northern Alberta, Saskatchewan, Manitoba, and Yukon.

The length of the forewings is about 15.5 millimetres (0.61 in) for males and 14.3 mm (0.56 in) for females.

Larval biology and host plants are not known, but host plants are likely to be one or more species of the plant groups common in peatland habitats such as Salix and various Ericaceae.
