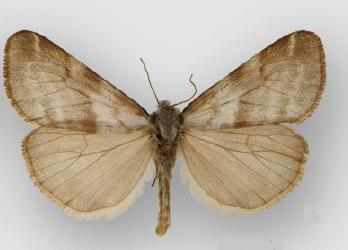
- Dodia tarandus imago

Scientific classification
- Kingdom: Animalia
- Phylum: Arthropoda
- Class: Insecta
- Order: Lepidoptera
- Superfamily: Noctuoidea
- Family: Erebidae
- Subfamily: Arctiinae
- Subtribe: Callimorphina
- Genus: Dodia; Dyar, 1901

Diversity
- At least 7 or 8 species (see text)

Synonyms
- Hyalocoa Hampson, 1901

= Dodia =

Genus of moths

Dodia is a genus of woolly bear moths in the family Erebidae. The genus was erected by Harrison Gray Dyar Jr. in 1901. The moths are found in subarctic tundra and taiga ecosystems. They belong to the subtribe Callimorphina of tribe Arctiini.

Like most of their closest relatives, they are mid-sized moths (a few cm/around 1 inch wingspan) which may be active all day, but avoid direct sunlight. Unlike many of the Callimorphina, they are inconspicuous and coloured a somewhat translucent grey-brown and without bold markings. They have the typical slender body shape of other species of their subtribe, and they resemble, at a casual glance, certain larentiine geometer moths (Geometridae), e.g. the Operophterini, rather than the more typical Callimorphina. Like in the former, flightless females are known to occur in Dodia.

== Species ==
Long held to contain only two species, several more have been discovered and described since the 1980s. Consequently, it is quite possible that further species await discovery. As of 2009, the known species are:

- Dodia albertae Dyar, 1901
- Dodia diaphana (Eversmann, 1848)
- Dodia kononenkoi Tshistjakov & Lafontaine, 1984
- Dodia maja Rekelj & Česanek, 2009
- Dodia sazonovi Dubatolov, 1990
- Dodia tarandus Schmidt et Macaulay, 2009
- Dodia transbaikalensis Tshistjakov, 1988 (sometimes in D. kononenkoi)
- Dodia verticalis Lafontaine & Troubridge, [2000] 1999
