= Nikaea (moth) =

Scientific classification
- Kingdom: Animalia
- Phylum: Arthropoda
- Class: Insecta
- Order: Lepidoptera
- Superfamily: Noctuoidea
- Family: Erebidae
- Subfamily: Arctiinae
- Subtribe: Callimorphina
- Genus: Nikaea; Moore, 1879

Genus of moths

Nikaea is a genus of tiger moths in the family Erebidae.

== Species ==
The genus consists of two species.

- Nikaea longipennis (Walker, 1855)
  - Found in Kumaon, Nepal, Sikkim, Assam, China (Sichuan, Yunnan, Shaanxi, Hubei, Jiangxi, Zhejiang, Fujian).
- Nikaea matsumurai Kishida, 1983
  - Found in Taiwan and Ryukyu in Japan.
