= Dodia diaphana =

Scientific classification
- Domain: Eukaryota
- Kingdom: Animalia
- Phylum: Arthropoda
- Class: Insecta
- Order: Lepidoptera
- Superfamily: Noctuoidea
- Family: Erebidae
- Subfamily: Arctiinae
- Genus: Dodia
- Species: D. diaphana

Binomial name
- Dodia diaphana (Eversmann, 1848)

Synonyms
- Lithosia diaphana Eversmann, 1848; Hyalocoa diaphana

Species of moth

Dodia diaphana is a moth of the family Erebidae. It was described by Eduard Friedrich Eversmann in 1848. It is found in Russia and Mongolia.

== Subspecies ==
- Dodia diaphana diaphana (mountains of southern Siberia, Amur, Skihote-Alin, central Yakutia, northern Mongolia)
- Dodia diaphana arctica Tshistjakov, 1988 (eastern Yakutia, southern Magadan)
