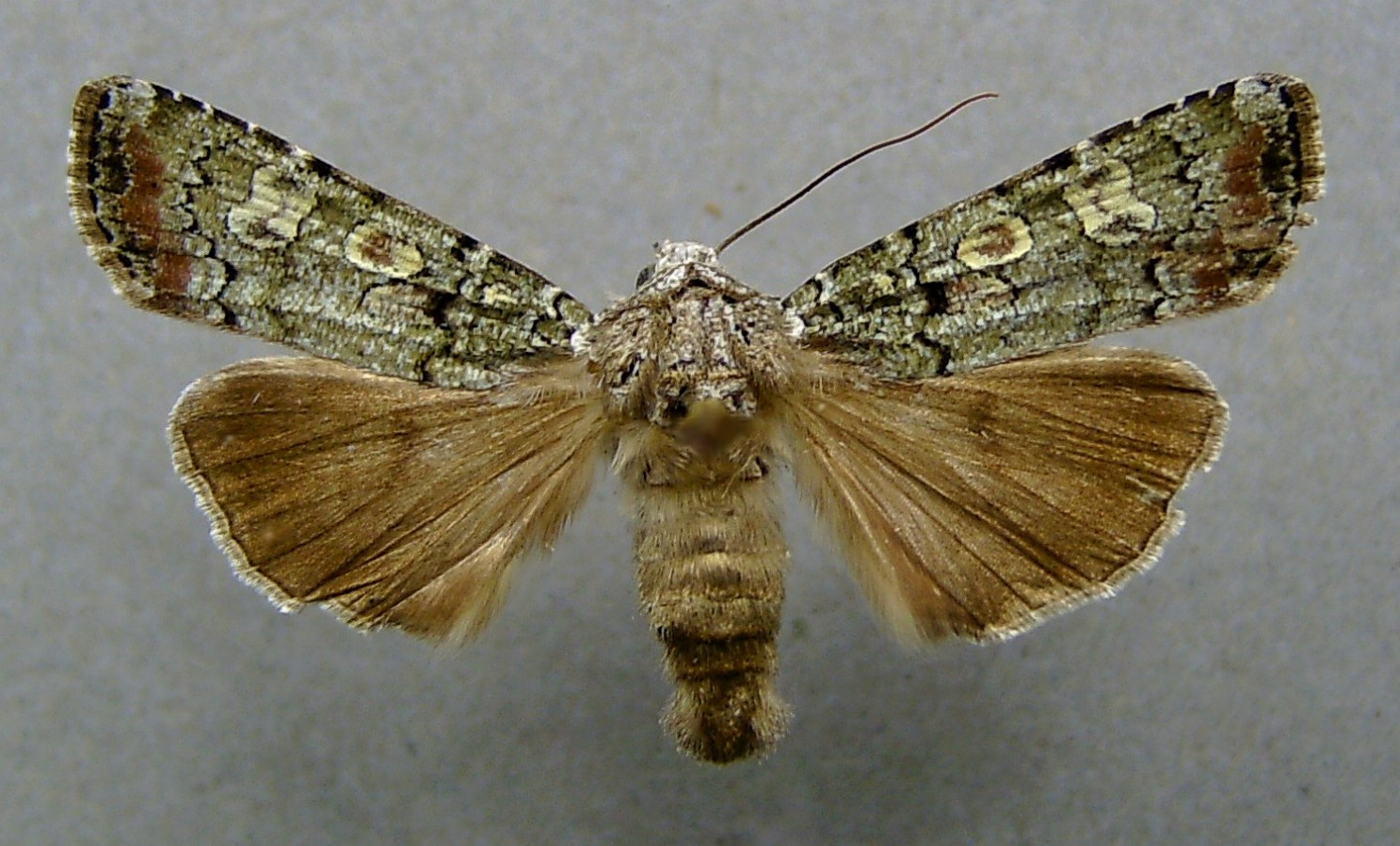

Scientific classification
- Kingdom: Animalia
- Phylum: Arthropoda
- Clade: Pancrustacea
- Class: Insecta
- Order: Lepidoptera
- Superfamily: Noctuoidea
- Family: Noctuidae
- Genus: Actebia
- Species: A. praecox

Binomial name
- Actebia praecox (Linnaeus, 1758)

Synonyms
- Actebia praeceps; Ochropleura praecox (Linnaeus, 1758); Phalaena praecox; Rhyacia praecox

= Actebia praecox =

Species of moth

Actebia praecox, the Portland moth, is a moth of the family Noctuidae. The species was first described by Carl Linnaeus in his 1758 10th edition of Systema Naturae. It is found in northern and central Europe, the Caucasus, central Asia, Siberia, Kamchatka, Sakhalin, the Kuriles, northern Turkey, Mongolia, China, Korea and Japan.

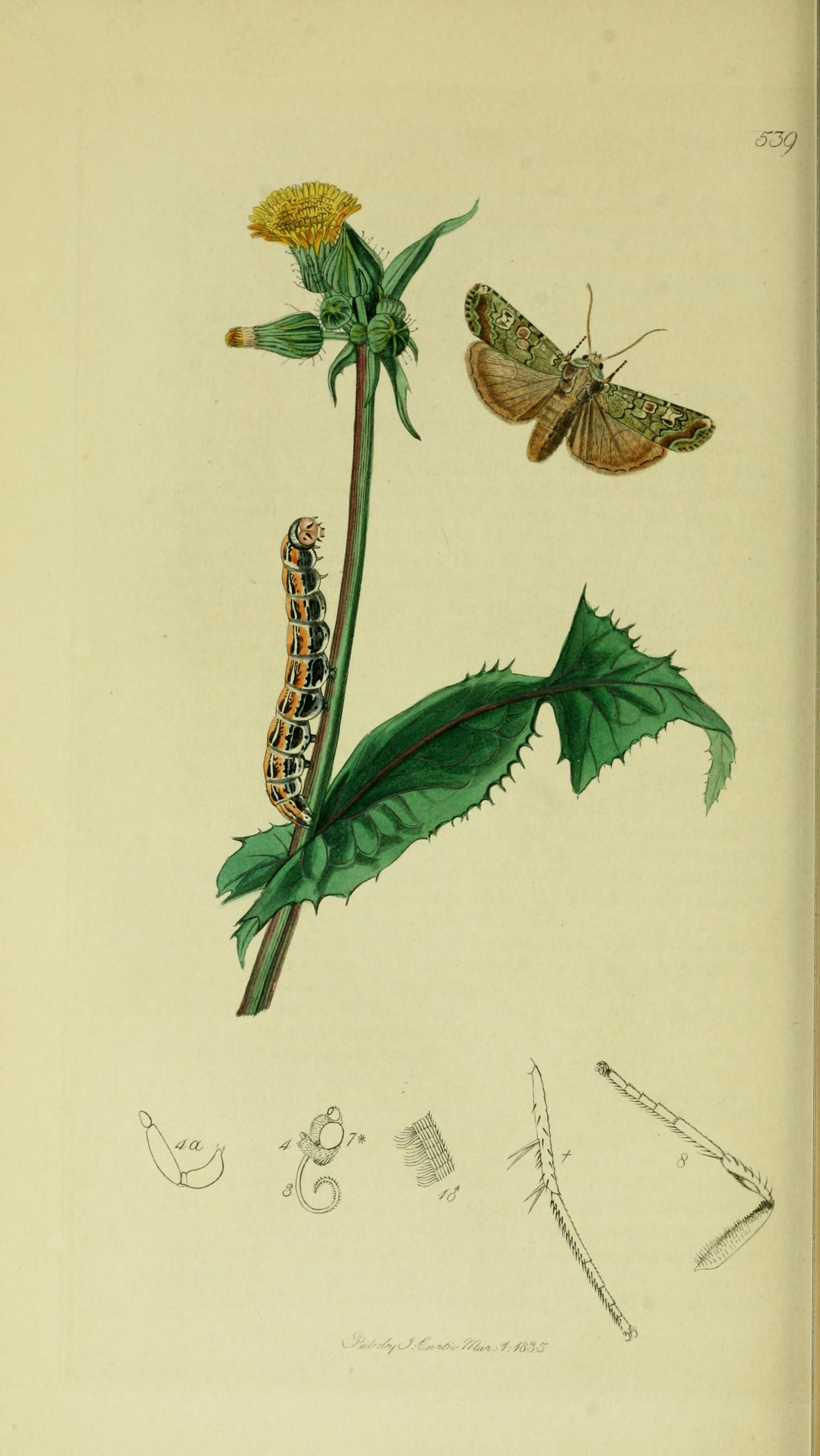
Illustration from John Curtis's British Entomology Volume 5

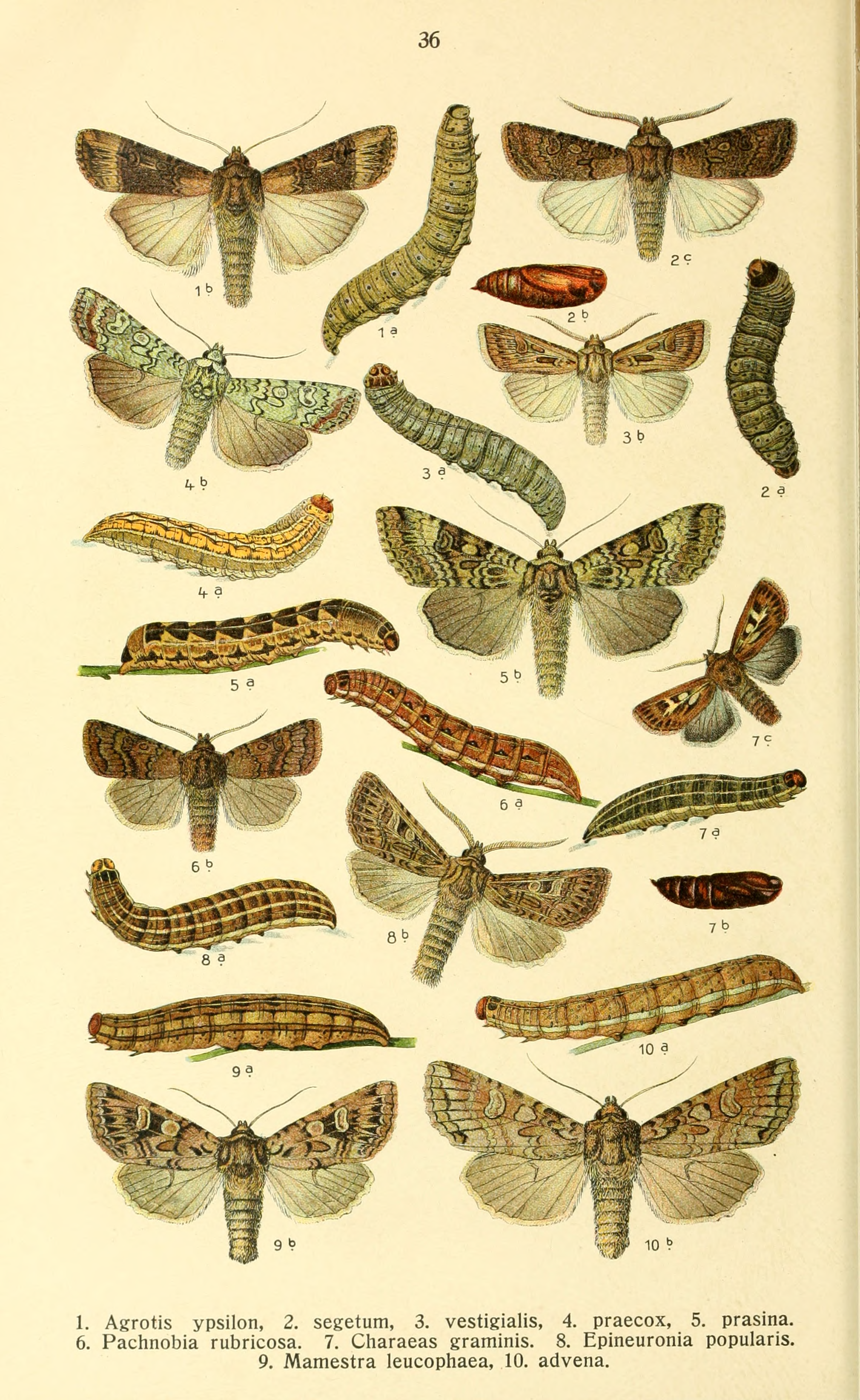
Moth and larva (figures 4) alongside related species in Karl Eckstein Die Schmetterlinge Deutschlands

The wingspan is 35–40 mm. "Forewing narrow and elongate, dull pale green, dusted with whitish; the three stigmata ochreous concisely black-edged; orbicular round, with a rounded rufous centre, reniform with a fine angled line swollen at each end; submarginal line preceded by a dull vinous band; apex whitish; hindwing fuscous brown. — ab. flavomaculata Graes., bluish green with the ochreous tints more yellow and the hindwings much darke-r, is confined to the Asiatic localities, but Leech states that some Irish specimens resemble it."

The caterpillar is light grey, or greenish coloured, has a dark lined yellowish back stripe with adjacent striking, ornamental, bright markings as well as yellow dorsolateral lines and a wide, white lateral stripe. The very slender pupa is shiny reddish brown and has a long thorn on the cremaster.

It is almost exclusively found on sandy terrain, for example in dune areas, sandy fields, shore regions and sand heaths.

The larvae feed on Salix repens and other sand-dune plants.
