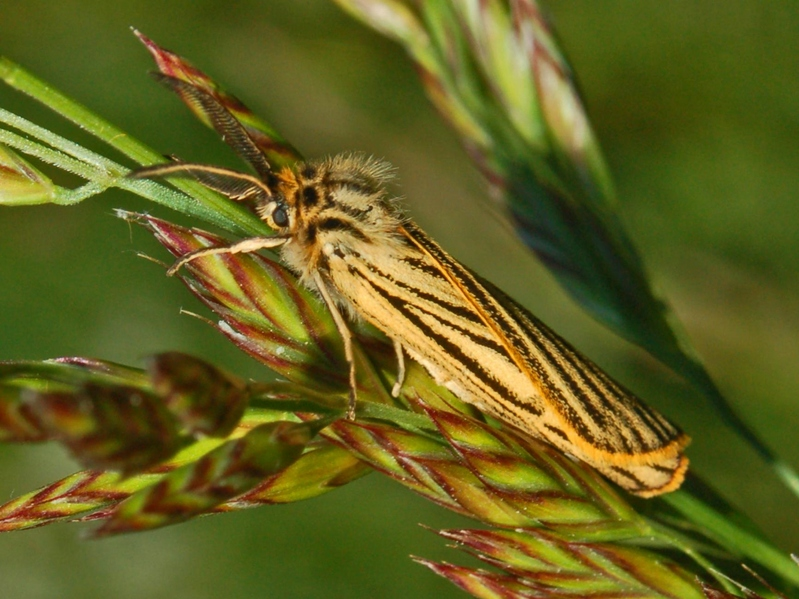
- Spiris striata

Scientific classification
- Kingdom: Animalia
- Phylum: Arthropoda
- Clade: Pancrustacea
- Class: Insecta
- Order: Lepidoptera
- Superfamily: Noctuoidea
- Family: Erebidae
- Subfamily: Arctiinae
- Subtribe: Callimorphina
- Genus: Spiris; Hübner, 1819

Synonyms
- Callopis Billberg, 1820; Eulepia Curtis, 1825; Ctenia Le Peletier, 1825; Emydia Boisduval, 1828

= Spiris =

Genus of moths

Spiris is a genus of tiger moths in the family Erebidae erected by Jacob Hübner in 1819.

== Species ==
- Spiris slovenica (Daniel, 1939)
- Spiris striata (Linnaeus, 1758)
- Spiris bipunctata (Staudinger, 1892)
