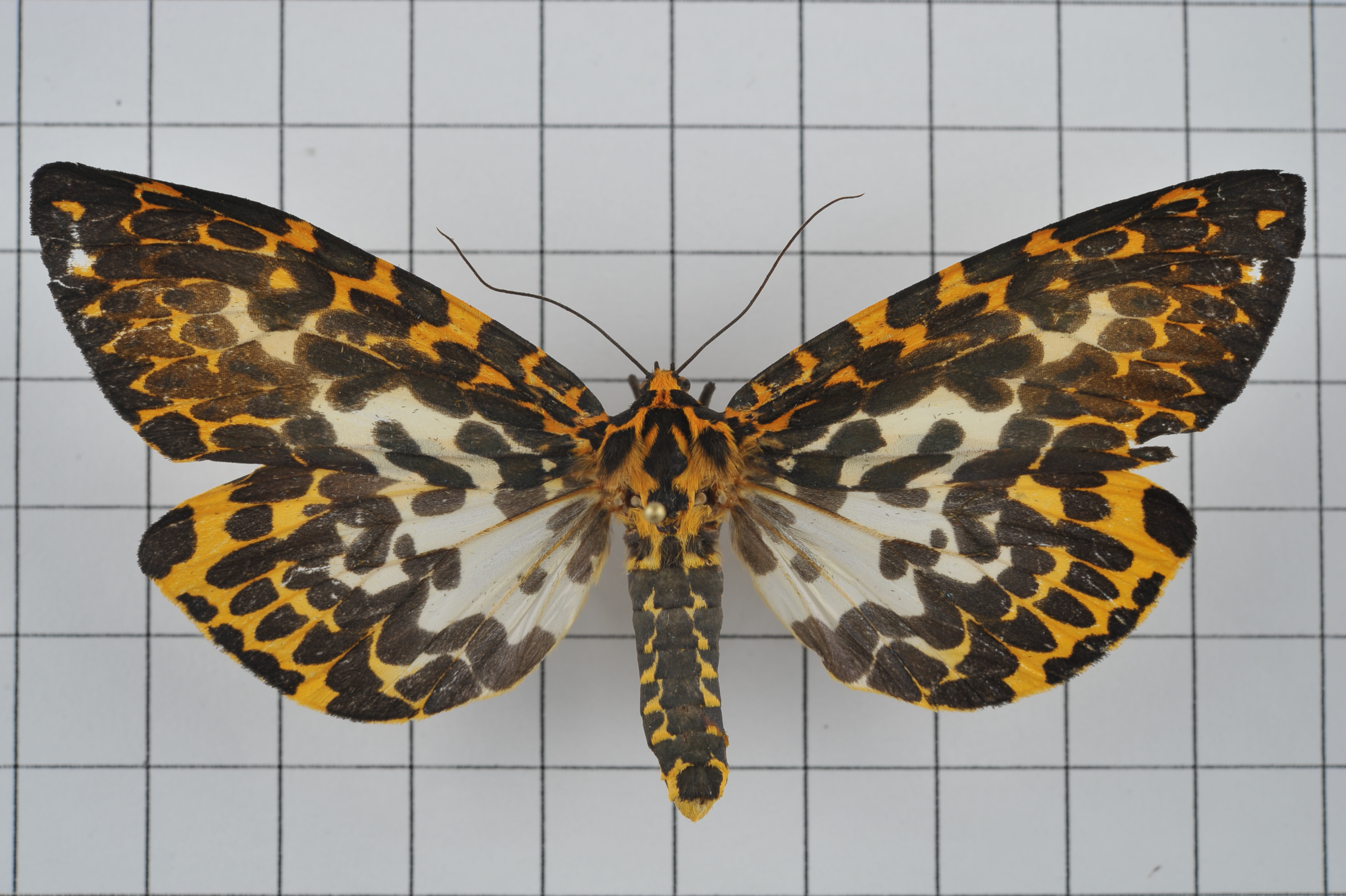
- Kishidaria takamukui

Scientific classification
- Domain: Eukaryota
- Kingdom: Animalia
- Phylum: Arthropoda
- Class: Insecta
- Order: Lepidoptera
- Superfamily: Noctuoidea
- Family: Erebidae
- Subfamily: Arctiinae
- Subtribe: Callimorphina
- Genus: Kishidaria; Dubatolov, 2004

= Kishidaria =

Genus of moths

Kishidaria is a genus of tiger moths in the family Erebidae. It is distributed in Asia from the Northeast India to southern China, Taiwan, and northern Vietnam.

== Species ==
The genus consists of the following species:

- Kishidaria khasiana (Moore, 1878)
- Kishidaria siniaevi (Witt & Speidel, 2006)
- Kishidaria takamukui (Matsumura, 1930)
- Kishidaria zerenaria (Oberthür, 1886)
