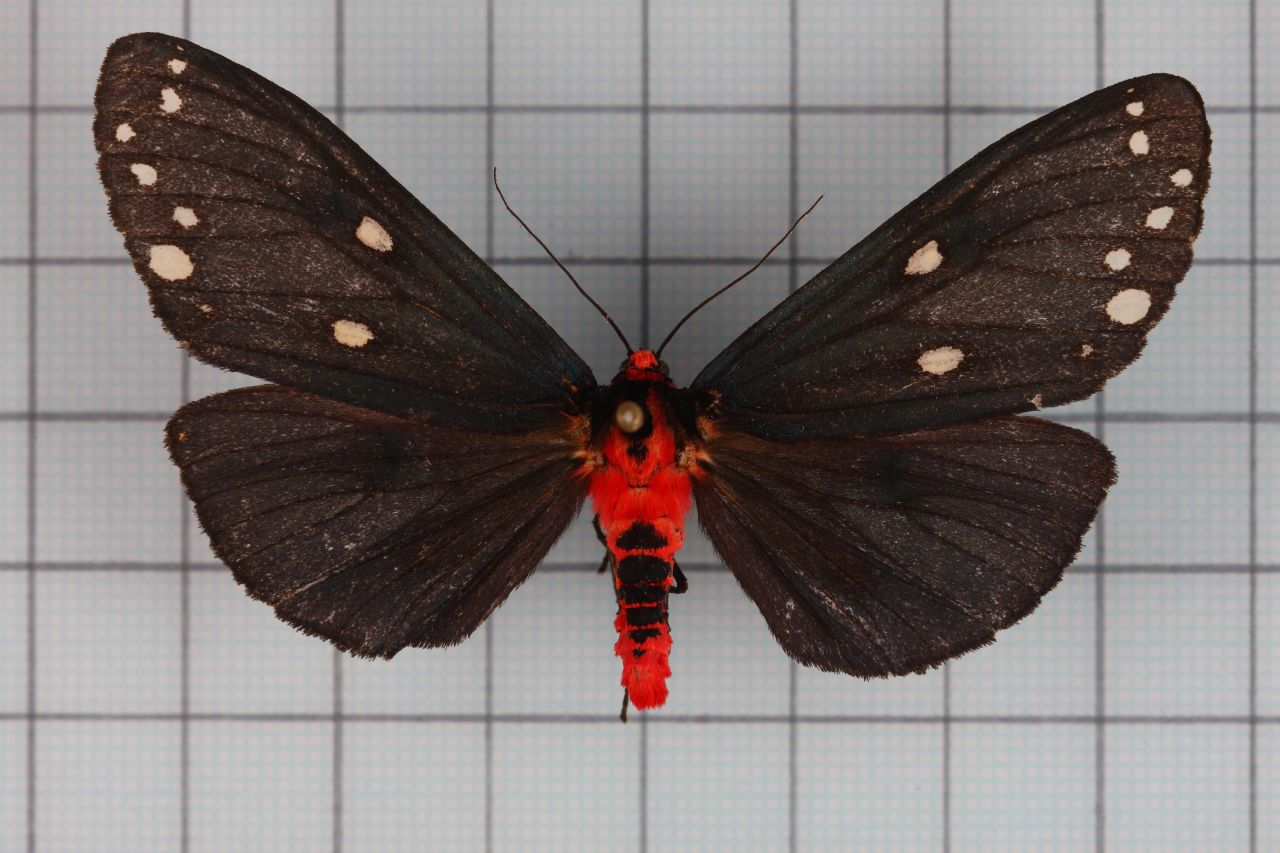

Scientific classification
- Kingdom: Animalia
- Phylum: Arthropoda
- Clade: Pancrustacea
- Class: Insecta
- Order: Lepidoptera
- Superfamily: Noctuoidea
- Family: Erebidae
- Subfamily: Arctiinae
- Genus: Taicallimorpha; Dubatolov & Kishida, 2006
- Species: T. albipuncta

Binomial name
- Taicallimorpha albipuncta (Wileman, 1910)

Synonyms
- Callimorpha albipuncta Wileman, 1910; Eucallimorpha albipuncta; Eucallimorpha arizana Matsumura, 1911

= Taicallimorpha =

Genus of moths

Taicallimorpha is a genus of tiger moths in the family Erebidae. The genus is endemic in Taiwan and consists of only one species, Taicallimorpha albipuncta.
