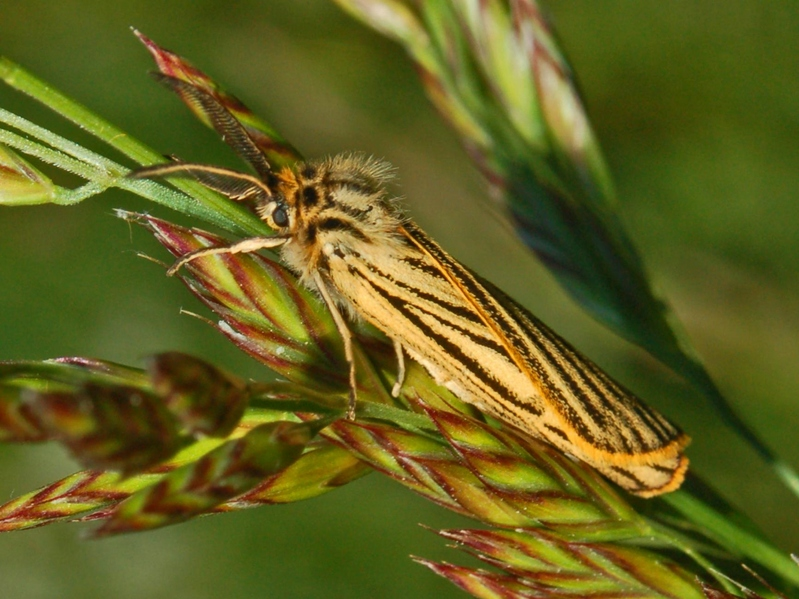
- Male
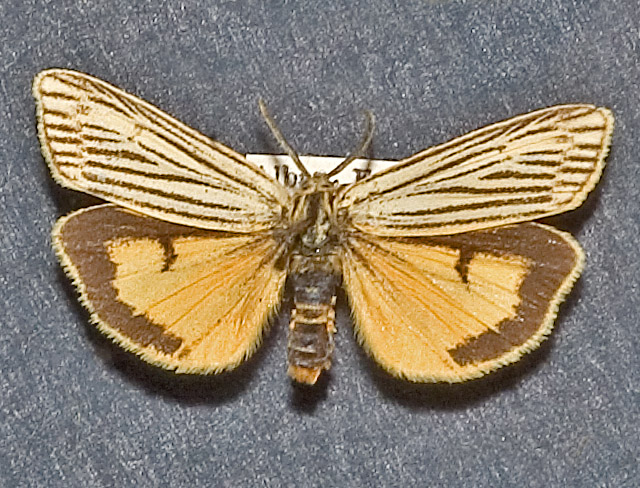
- Mounted specimen

Scientific classification
- Kingdom: Animalia
- Phylum: Arthropoda
- Class: Insecta
- Order: Lepidoptera
- Superfamily: Noctuoidea
- Family: Erebidae
- Subfamily: Arctiinae
- Genus: Spiris
- Species: S. striata

Binomial name
- Spiris striata (Linnaeus, 1758)

Synonyms
- Phalaena striata Linnaeus, 1758; Phalaena grammica Linnaeus, 1758; Phalaena processionea Müller, 1774; Phalaena palladia Fourcroy, 1785; Bombyx striata Borkhausen, 1790; Bombyx melanoptera Brahm, 1791; Euprepia funerea Eversmann, 1847; Coscinia albida Schulze, 1910; Eyprepia incompleta Oberthür, 1911; Eyprepia nigra Spuler, 1913; Emydia grammica var. xanthopera Oberthür, 1884; Euprepia grammica f. intermedia Oberthür, 1910; Coscinia striata strandi Obraztsov, 1936; Coscinia striata wisniewskii Wojtusiak et Niesolowski, 1946; Coscinia striata hospitali Marten, 1948

= Spiris striata =

Feathered footman

Species of moth

Spiris striata, the feathered footman, is a moth of the family Erebidae. The species was first described by Carl Linnaeus in his 1758 10th edition of Systema Naturae.

== Description ==
This very distinctive moth has a wingspan of 30–35 millimetres (1.2–1.4 in). Forewings are usually yellow or light yellow, with narrow longitudinal dark brown stripes in males, while in females the striations may be missing or restricted to the outer parts. Also hindwings are yellow, but they are darker and much wider than forewings and show a dark brown edge. The antennae of the males are pinnate. The caterpillars are hairy and black, with bright spots on the sides and a reddish-brown stripe on the back. The moths are diurnal and they fly May to August depending on the location.

The larvae feed on low vegetation and grasses, such as silver grass (Corynephorus spec.), fescue (Festuca spp.), heather (Calluna spp.), meadow sage (Salvia pratensis), hawkweed (Hieracium spp.) and mugwort (Artemisia spp.).

== Distribution and habitat ==
This species can be found in Europe, Anatolia, Kazakhstan, Siberia and Mongolia (excluding eastern regions). The feathered footman prefers sunny, sandy, open areas with grass and herbaceous plants, rarely calcareous grasslands.
