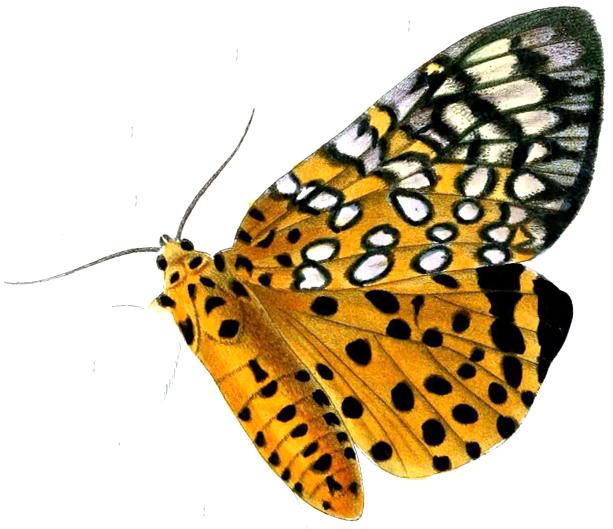

Scientific classification
- Kingdom: Animalia
- Phylum: Arthropoda
- Class: Insecta
- Order: Lepidoptera
- Superfamily: Noctuoidea
- Family: Erebidae
- Subfamily: Arctiinae
- Genus: Sebastia; Kirby, 1892
- Species: S. argus

Binomial name
- Sebastia argus (Walker, 1862)

Synonyms
- Grotea Moore, [1866] (preocc. Cresson, 1864); Moorea Hampson, 1894 (preocc. Jones & Holland, 1869); Hypercompe argus Walker, 1862; Grotea elegans Moore, [1866]

= Sebastia argus =

Species of moth

Sebastia is a monotypic tiger moth genus in the family Erebidae described by William Forsell Kirby in 1892. Its only species, Sebastia argus, was first described by Francis Walker in 1862. It can be found in Yunnan and Bangladesh.
