= Dodia transbaikalensis =

Scientific classification
- Domain: Eukaryota
- Kingdom: Animalia
- Phylum: Arthropoda
- Class: Insecta
- Order: Lepidoptera
- Superfamily: Noctuoidea
- Family: Erebidae
- Subfamily: Arctiinae
- Genus: Dodia
- Species: D. transbaikalensis

Binomial name
- Dodia transbaikalensis Tshistjakov, 1988

Synonyms
- Dodia kononenkoi transbaikalensis Tshistjakov, 1988

Species of moth

Dodia transbaikalensis is a moth of the family Erebidae. It was described by Yuri A. Tshistjakov in 1988. It is found in Siberia and Transbaikalia in Russia.
