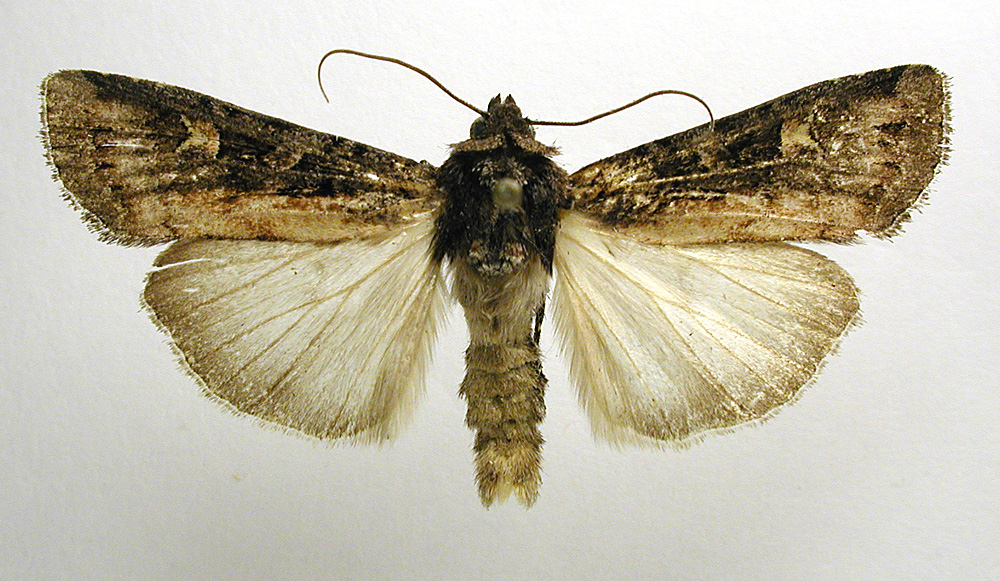
- Actebia fennica

Scientific classification
- Domain: Eukaryota
- Kingdom: Animalia
- Phylum: Arthropoda
- Class: Insecta
- Order: Lepidoptera
- Superfamily: Noctuoidea
- Family: Noctuidae
- Tribe: Noctuini
- Genus: Actebia; Stephens, 1829

Synonyms
- Dissimactebia Beck, 1991; Protexarnis McDunnough, 1929

= Actebia =

Genus of moths

Actebia is a genus of moths of the family Noctuidae.

== Species ==
- Actebia fennica (Tauscher, 1806) – Eversmann's rustic, black army cutworm
- Actebia praecox (Linnaeus, 1758) – Portland moth

Subgenus Protexarnis

- Actebia balanitis (Grote, 1873)
- Actebia squalida (Guenée, 1852)
- Actebia opisoleuca (Staudinger, 1881)
