= Epimydia =

Scientific classification
- Domain: Eukaryota
- Kingdom: Animalia
- Phylum: Arthropoda
- Class: Insecta
- Order: Lepidoptera
- Superfamily: Noctuoidea
- Family: Erebidae
- Subfamily: Arctiinae
- Genus: Epimydia; Staudinger, 1892
- Species: E. dialampra

Binomial name
- Epimydia dialampra Staudinger, 1892

Genus of moths

Epimydia is a monotypic tiger moth genus in the family Erebidae. Its only species, Epimydia dialampra, can be found in mountainous steppe areas in southern Siberia, eastern Yakutia and northern Mongolia. Both the genus and species were first described by Otto Staudinger in 1892. Females are very small and brachypterous.
