= August Michael Tauscher =

August Michael Tauscher (1771–1841) was a philosopher, botanist and entomologist. He made, between 1807 and 1812 an exploration of Russia on behalf of Count Alexey Razumovsky. After 1814 he lived in Saxony and after 1826 in Dresden described as an independent scholar. He was a correspondent of Johann Wolfgang von Goethe and a Member of The Moscow Academy of Sciences.

== Works ==
Partial List

- (1809) Sur quelques noctuelles nouvelles de la Russie Mém. Soc. Nat. Moscou 2: 313–326, 1pl
- (1818) Versuch, die Idee einer fortgesetzten Schöpfung oder einer fortwährenden Entstehung neuer Organismen aus regelmässig wirkenden Naturkräften, als vereinbar mit den Thatsachen der wirklichen Erfahrung, den Grundsätzen einer gereinigten Vernuft und den Wahrheiten der religiösen Offenbahrung darzustellen. Starke, Chemnitz.
