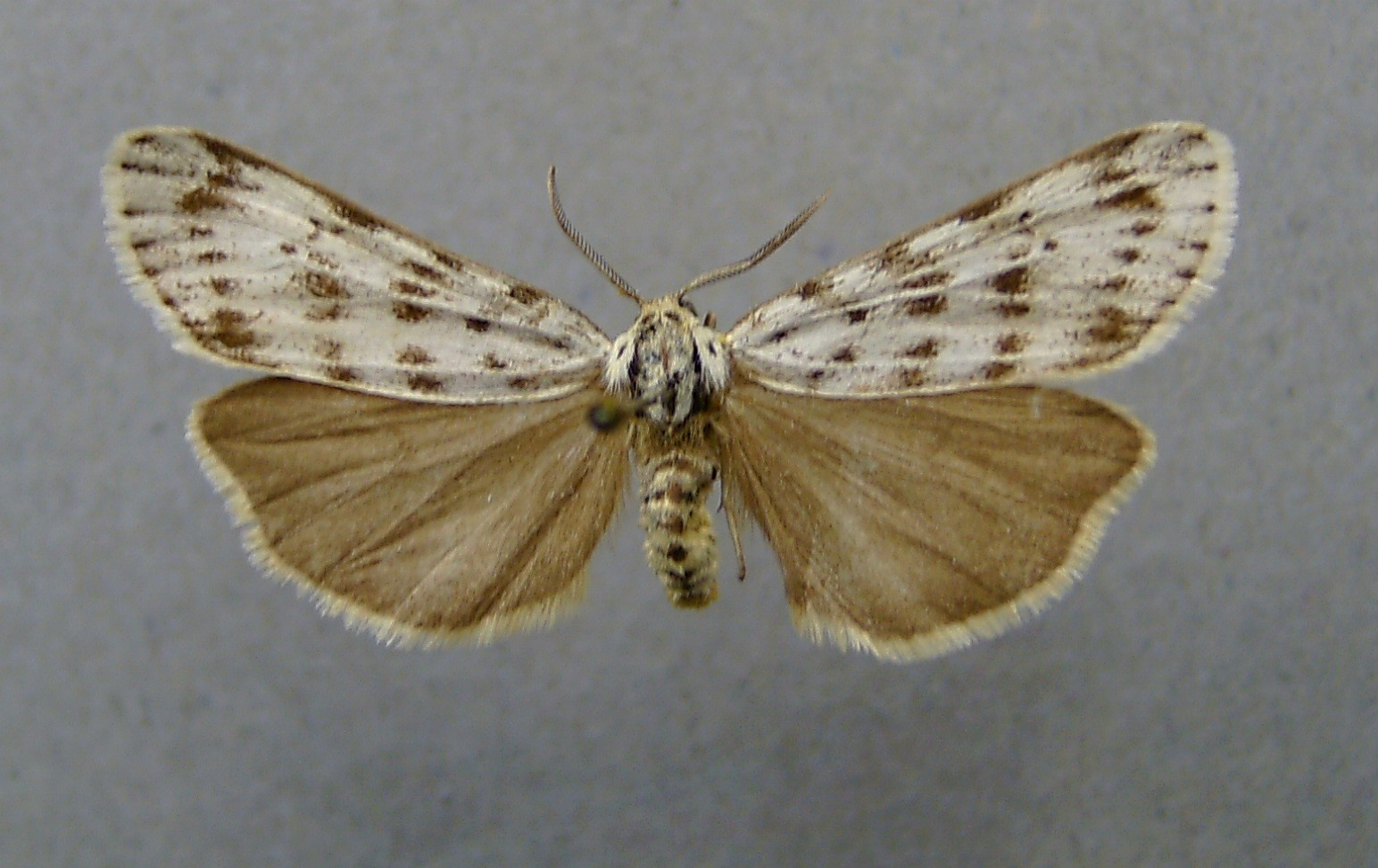

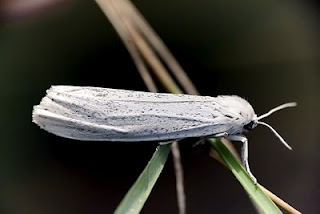

Scientific classification
- Kingdom: Animalia
- Phylum: Arthropoda
- Clade: Pancrustacea
- Class: Insecta
- Order: Lepidoptera
- Superfamily: Noctuoidea
- Family: Erebidae
- Subfamily: Arctiinae
- Genus: Coscinia
- Species: C. cribraria

Binomial name
- Coscinia cribraria (Linnaeus, 1758)

Synonyms
- List: Phalaena (Bombyx) cribraria Linnaeus, 1758; Coscinia cribrumella J. Hübner, 1756; Euprepia cribraria (Linnaeus, 1758); Spiris cribraria (Linnaeus, 1758); Coscinia cribrum (Linnaeus, 1761); Emydia cribrum (Linnaeus, 1761); Phalaena cribrum Linnaeus, 1761; Coscinia cribellum Esper, 1786; Coscinia candida Cyrillo, 1787; Emydia cribrum subsp. candida (Cyrillo, 1787); Coscinia colon J. Hübner, 1792; Coscinia albeola J. Hübner, 1804; Coscinia chrysocephala J. Hübner, 1804; Coscinia coscinia Ochsenheimer, 1810; Emydia coscinia (Ochsenheimer, 1810); Coscinia cyrillii J. Hübner, 1816; Coscinia bifasciata (Rambur, 1832); Euprepia bifasciata Rambur, 1832; Coscinia punctigera Freyer, 1834; Coscinia rippertii Boisduval, 1834; Coscinia candida Herrich-Schäffer, 1846; Coscinia inquinata Rambur, 1866; Coscinia sibirica Staudinger, 1892; Coscinia infuscata Rey, 1903; Coscinia anglica Oberthür, 1911; Coscinia canigulensis Oberthür, 1911; Coscinia leucomelas Oberthür, 1911; Coscinia nevadensis Oberthür, 1911; Coscinia rondoni Oberthür, 1911; Coscinia vernetensis Oberthür, 1911; Coscinia pseudozatima Krulikowsky, 1911; Coscinia fortestrigata Schawerda, 1929; Coscinia paucisignata Schawerda, 1929; Coscinia transversata Schawerda, 1929; Coscinia pseudobifasciata Dannehl, 1929; Coscinia ribbei Draudt, 1931; Coscinia limbata Rondou, 1932; Coscinia quadrifasciata Reisser, 1933; Coscinia nigromarginata Lingonblad, 1950; Coscinia delimbata Cockayne, 1951; Coscinia flavescens Lempke, 1961; Coscinia punctata Lempke, 1961; Coscina benderi Marten, 1957

= Coscinia cribraria =

Speckled footman

Species of moth

Coscinia cribraria, the speckled footman, is a species of moth belonging to the subfamily Arctiinae within the large family Erebidae. This moth has a widespread distribution in the Palearctic.

== Taxonomy ==
Coscinia cribraria was first described as Phalaena (Bombyx) cribraria by Carl Linnaeus in his 1758 10th edition of Systema Naturae. Linnaeus's P. cribraria was designated as the type species of the genus Coscinia by George Hampson in 1901, the genus having been proposed by Jacob Hübner in 1819. This is a polytypic species with a number of described subspecies. For example, in the United Kingdom there is an endemic subspecies C. c. bivittata occurs in Dorset ad the New Forest while a migrant subspecies from continental Europe C. c. arenaria occurs as a scarce migrant in eastern England. Other taxa from Iberia, such as Coscinia benderi, C. c. rippertii and C. c. ibicenca have also been shown to be subspecies of C. ccribaria, having previously been regarded as separate species. The genus Coscinia is placed within the subtribe Callimorphina within the tribe Arctiini in the subfamily Arctiinae, part of the large family Erebidae.

== Description ==
Coscinia cribraria has a forewing which has a background colour of dirty white marked with black streaks along the wings and crossbands made up of dark dots, both of which vary in extent. The subspecies arenaria has an almost pure white forewing. The speckled footman has a wingspan of between 30 and 35 mm (1.2 and 1.4 in).

== Distribution and habitat ==
Coscinia cribraria has a wide Palearctic distribution being found from Northwestern Africa Iberia and southern Great Britain east to China and Mongolia. In Europe, north of the Alps, the speckled footman is typically found on sandy heaths and open sandy pine forests. To the south of the Alps, it inhabits on dry mountain meadows with stony or rocky areas and around the Mediterranean this species can be found in habitats like maquis and in open forests.

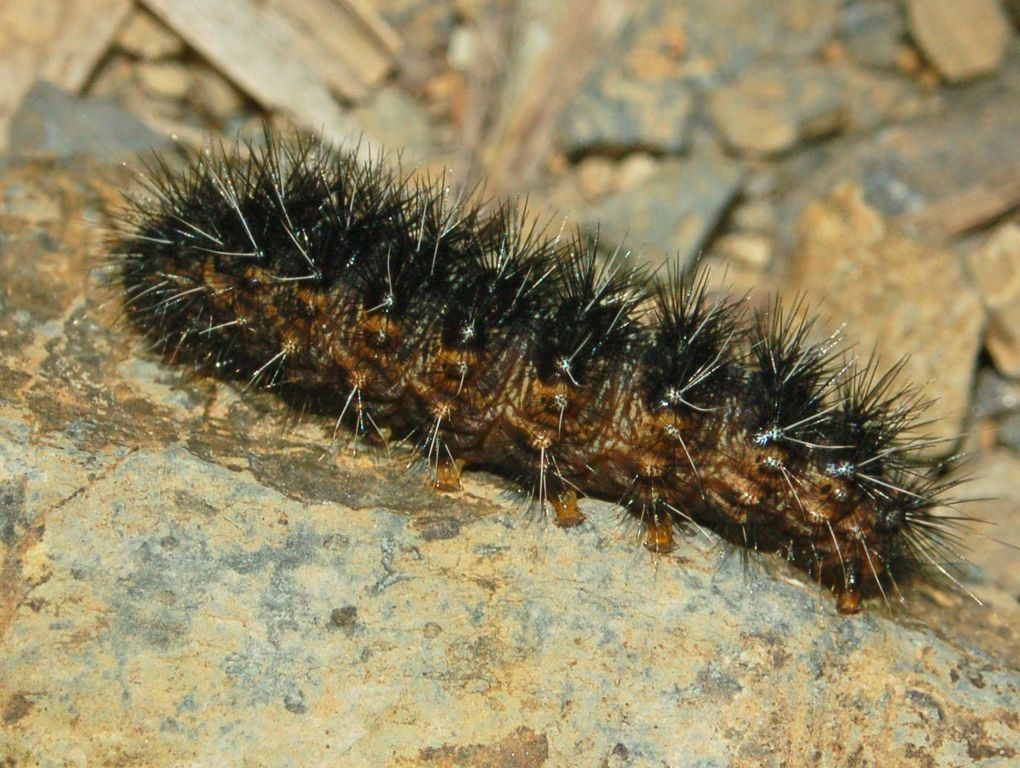

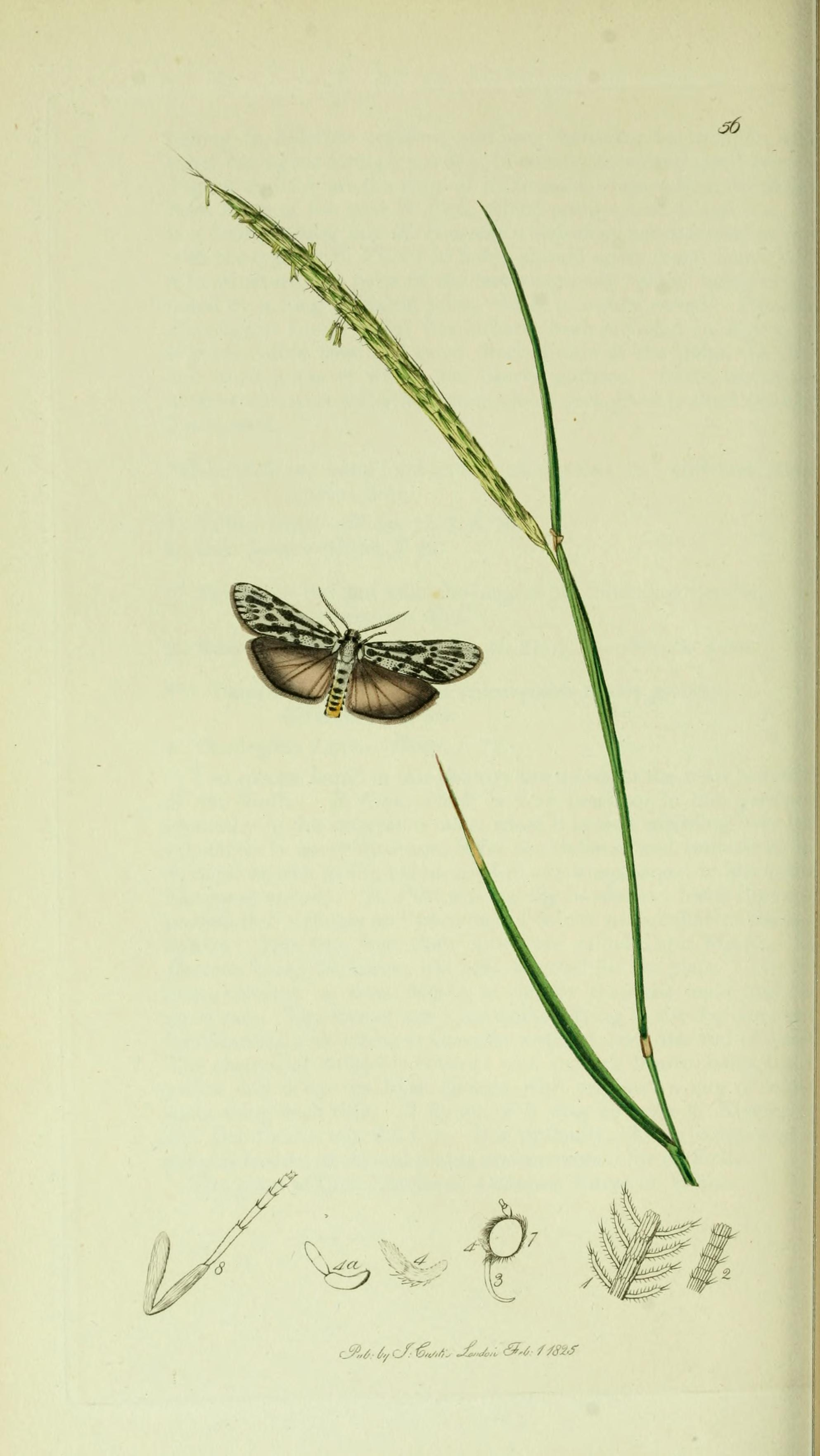
Illustration from John Curtis's British Entomology Volume 5

== Biology ==
Coscinia cribraria feeds on a wide variety of plants and caterpillars have been recorded feeding on bristle beny (Agrostis curtisii), bell heather (Erica cinerea), cross-leaved heath (Erica tetralix), ling (Calluna vulgaris) and bilberry (Vaccinium myrtillus). However, like other footman moths, the lichens in the genus Cladonia are an important component of the habitat and larval diet of the speckled footman. In southern England the eggs are laid in June, mainly on ling and bristle bent with a few females being observed to oviposit during daylight hours. The eggs are laid high up on the stems of the plants. The caterpillars overwinter as larvae and pupate in the June following their hatching, creating rather flimsy cocoons among grass and heather. At altitudes of less than 1,000 m (3,300 ft) in this species' range south of the Alps the speckled footman is bivoltine with imagos on the wing in May and June, as well as August and September.

== Conservation ==
Coscinia cribaria is common in the southern part ofits range but in northern Europe it is vulnerable to the destruction of the open sandy heaths it prefers. In the United Kingdom it is classified as nationally rare meaning that it has been recorded from fewer than 15, or fewer, hectads.
