= Incertae sedis (Arctiini) =

Scientific classification
- Kingdom: Animalia
- Phylum: Arthropoda
- Clade: Pancrustacea
- Class: Insecta
- Order: Lepidoptera
- Superfamily: Noctuoidea
- Family: Erebidae
- Subfamily: Arctiinae
- Tribe: Arctiini
- Subtribe: Incertae sedis

List of moth genera

Several genera of the tribe Arctiini of tiger moths are placed as incertae sedis due to the uncertainty of their phylogenetic relationships within the tribe.

== Genera ==
The following genera are not classified in a subtribe.

- Amphicallia
- Balaca
- Baroa
- Caribarctia
- Curoba
- Diospage
- Euceriodes
- Heliozona
- Ilemodes
- Ischnarctia
- Leucopardus
- Mannina
- Melora
- Omochroa
- Panachranta
- Stenarctia
