= Melora =

Melora may refer to:

- Melora (moth)
- Melora (Dungeons & Dragons)
- "Melora" (Star Trek Deep Space Nine)
- Melora (novel), a mystery novel by Mignon G. Eberhart

== People with the name ==
- Melora Creager (born 1966), American singer-songwriter and cellist
- Melora Hardin (born 1967), American actress and singer
- Melora Walters (born 1959), American actress
