= Pallada =

Pallada (Russian: Паллада — Pallas) is the name of several ships of the Russian navy.

- Russian frigate Pallada, a sailing frigate
- Russian cruiser Pallada (1899), the lead ship of her class of protected cruiser
- Russian cruiser Pallada (1906), a Bayan-class armored cruiser

A commercial sailing vessel also bears the name Pallada

- Pallada (tallship), a modern tallship

== See also ==
- Josip Pallada
- Euceriodes pallada
- Pallada Asset Management
