= Coscinia liouvillei =

Scientific classification
- Kingdom: Animalia
- Phylum: Arthropoda
- Class: Insecta
- Order: Lepidoptera
- Superfamily: Noctuoidea
- Family: Erebidae
- Subfamily: Arctiinae
- Genus: Coscinia
- Species: C. liouvillei

Binomial name
- Coscinia liouvillei Le Cerf, 1928

Species of moth

Coscinia liouvillei is a moth of the family Erebidae. It was described by Ferdinand Le Cerf in 1928. It is found in Morocco.

== Taxonomy ==
The species is alternatively listed as a subspecies of Coscinia libyssa.
