= Panachranta =

Panachranta may refer to:

- Panachranta (icon)
- Panachranta (moth)
