= Euceriodes =

Scientific classification
- Domain: Eukaryota
- Kingdom: Animalia
- Phylum: Arthropoda
- Class: Insecta
- Order: Lepidoptera
- Superfamily: Noctuoidea
- Family: Erebidae
- Subfamily: Arctiinae
- Tribe: Arctiini
- Subtribe: Incertae sedis
- Genus: Euceriodes; Travassos, 1961

Genus of moths

Euceriodes is a genus of moths in the family Erebidae first described by Travassos in 1961.

== Species ==
- Euceriodes pallada
- Euceriodes wernickei
