= Amphicallia kostlani =

Scientific classification
- Kingdom: Animalia
- Phylum: Arthropoda
- Class: Insecta
- Order: Lepidoptera
- Superfamily: Noctuoidea
- Family: Erebidae
- Subfamily: Arctiinae
- Genus: Amphicallia
- Species: A. kostlani

Binomial name
- Amphicallia kostlani Strand, 1911

Species of moth

Amphicallia kostlani is a moth of the subfamily Arctiinae. It is found in Ethiopia.
