= Amphicallia quagga =

Scientific classification
- Kingdom: Animalia
- Phylum: Arthropoda
- Class: Insecta
- Order: Lepidoptera
- Superfamily: Noctuoidea
- Family: Erebidae
- Subfamily: Arctiinae
- Genus: Amphicallia
- Species: A. quagga

Binomial name
- Amphicallia quagga Strand, 1909

Species of moth

Amphicallia quagga is a moth of the subfamily Arctiinae. It is found in Tanzania.
