= Balaca =

Scientific classification
- Kingdom: Animalia
- Phylum: Arthropoda
- Class: Insecta
- Order: Lepidoptera
- Superfamily: Noctuoidea
- Family: Erebidae
- Subfamily: Arctiinae
- Subtribe: Incertae sedis
- Genus: Balaca; Walker, 1865
- Species: B. picaria

Binomial name
- Balaca picaria Walker, 1865

Genus of moths

Balaca is a monotypic moth genus in the subfamily Arctiinae. Its only species, Balaca picaria, can be found in New Guinea. Both the genus and the species were first described by Francis Walker in 1865.
