= Amphicallia pratti =

Scientific classification
- Kingdom: Animalia
- Phylum: Arthropoda
- Class: Insecta
- Order: Lepidoptera
- Superfamily: Noctuoidea
- Family: Erebidae
- Subfamily: Arctiinae
- Genus: Amphicallia
- Species: A. pratti

Binomial name
- Amphicallia pratti (Kenrick, 1914)

Synonyms
- Pericallia pratti Kenrick, 1914

Species of moth

Amphicallia pratti is a moth of the subfamily Arctiinae. It is found on Madagascar.
