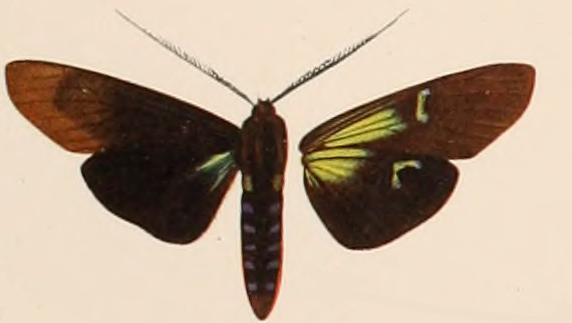
- Diospage engelkei

Scientific classification
- Kingdom: Animalia
- Phylum: Arthropoda
- Class: Insecta
- Order: Lepidoptera
- Superfamily: Noctuoidea
- Family: Erebidae
- Subfamily: Arctiinae
- Tribe: Arctiini
- Subtribe: Incertae sedis
- Genus: Diospage; Walker, 1854

Synonyms
- Entomis Herrich-Schäffer, 1855

= Diospage =

Genus of moths

Diospage is a genus of moths in the family Erebidae first described by Francis Walker in 1854.

== Species ==
- Diospage carilla Schaus, 1910
- Diospage chrysobasis Hampson, 1901
- Diospage cleasa (Druce, 1883)
- Diospage engelkei Rothschild, 1909
- Diospage rhebus (Cramer, 1779)
- Diospage semimarginata Rothschild, 1909
- Diospage splendens (Druce, 1895)
- Diospage steinbachi Rothschild, 1909
- Diospage violitincta Rothschild, 1909
