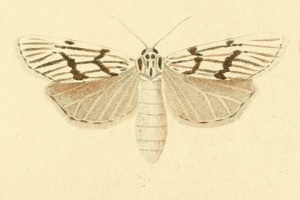

Scientific classification
- Kingdom: Animalia
- Phylum: Arthropoda
- Clade: Pancrustacea
- Class: Insecta
- Order: Lepidoptera
- Superfamily: Noctuoidea
- Family: Erebidae
- Subfamily: Arctiinae
- Genus: Coscinia
- Species: C. bifasciata

Binomial name
- Coscinia bifasciata (Rambur, 1832)

Synonyms
- Lithosia bifasciata Rambur, 1832; Euprepia cribraria bifasciata

= Coscinia bifasciata =

Species of moth

Coscinia bifasciata is a moth of the family Erebidae. It was described by Jules Pierre Rambur in 1832. It is found on Corsica and Sardinia.

Adults are on wing from June to August in one or two generations per year.

The larvae feed on Calluna, Erica, Vaccinium, Genista, Taraxacum and Plantago species. The species overwinters in the larval stage.
