= Coscinia mariarosae =

Scientific classification
- Domain: Eukaryota
- Kingdom: Animalia
- Phylum: Arthropoda
- Class: Insecta
- Order: Lepidoptera
- Superfamily: Noctuoidea
- Family: Erebidae
- Subfamily: Arctiinae
- Genus: Coscinia
- Species: C. mariarosae

Binomial name
- Coscinia mariarosae Expósito, 1991

Species of moth

Coscinia mariarosae is a moth of the family Erebidae. It was described by A. Expósito-Hermosa in 1991. It is endemic to Mallorca.
