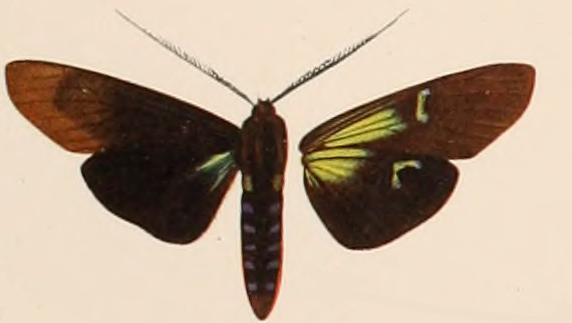

Scientific classification
- Domain: Eukaryota
- Kingdom: Animalia
- Phylum: Arthropoda
- Class: Insecta
- Order: Lepidoptera
- Superfamily: Noctuoidea
- Family: Erebidae
- Subfamily: Arctiinae
- Genus: Diospage
- Species: D. engelkei

Binomial name
- Diospage engelkei Rothschild, 1909

= Diospage engelkei =

Species of moth

Diospage engelkei is a moth of the subfamily Arctiinae first described by Rothschild in 1909. It is found in South America (the type location is listed as "Onaca, Santa Martha, 2200 ft").
