= Euceriodes wernickei =

Scientific classification
- Domain: Eukaryota
- Kingdom: Animalia
- Phylum: Arthropoda
- Class: Insecta
- Order: Lepidoptera
- Superfamily: Noctuoidea
- Family: Erebidae
- Subfamily: Arctiinae
- Genus: Euceriodes
- Species: E. wernickei

Binomial name
- Euceriodes wernickei Draudt, 1917

Species of moth

Euceriodes wernickei is a species of moth in the subfamily Arctiinae first described by Max Wilhelm Karl Draudt in 1917. It is found in Santa Catarina, Brazil.
