= Diospage chrysobasis =

Scientific classification
- Kingdom: Animalia
- Phylum: Arthropoda
- Class: Insecta
- Order: Lepidoptera
- Superfamily: Noctuoidea
- Family: Erebidae
- Subfamily: Arctiinae
- Genus: Diospage
- Species: D. chrysobasis

Binomial name
- Diospage chrysobasis Hampson, 1901

Species of moth

Diospage chrysobasis is a moth of the subfamily Arctiinae. It was described by George Hampson in 1901. It is found in Colombia.
