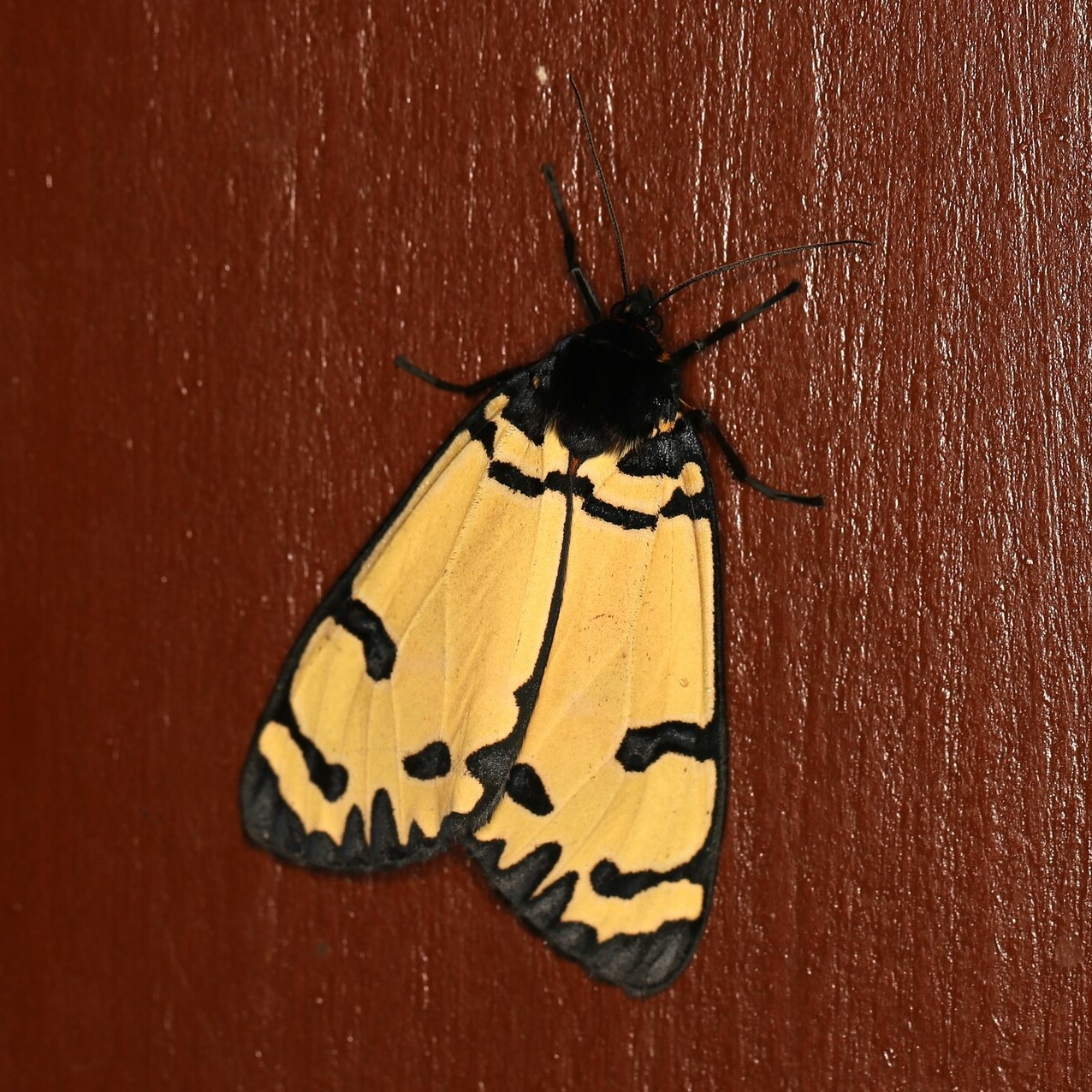

Scientific classification
- Kingdom: Animalia
- Phylum: Arthropoda
- Class: Insecta
- Order: Lepidoptera
- Superfamily: Noctuoidea
- Family: Erebidae
- Subfamily: Arctiinae
- Genus: Amphicallia
- Species: A. solai

Binomial name
- Amphicallia solai (H. Druce, 1907)

Synonyms
- Callimorpha solai H. Druce, 1907; Amphicallia piceosignata Bartel, 1903

= Amphicallia solai =

Species of moth

Amphicallia solai is a species of moth in the subfamily Arctiinae. It was first described by Herbert Druce in 1907 and is found in East Africa (Ethiopia, Kenya and Tanzania).

The larvae feed on Schinus molle and Crotalaria species.
