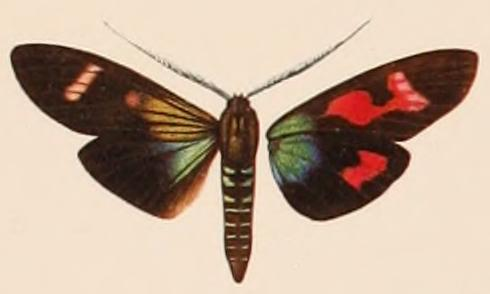

Scientific classification
- Domain: Eukaryota
- Kingdom: Animalia
- Phylum: Arthropoda
- Class: Insecta
- Order: Lepidoptera
- Superfamily: Noctuoidea
- Family: Erebidae
- Subfamily: Arctiinae
- Genus: Diospage
- Species: D. steinbachi

Binomial name
- Diospage steinbachi Rothschild, 1909

= Diospage steinbachi =

Species of moth

Diospage steinbachi is a moth of the subfamily Arctiinae first described by Rothschild in 1909. It is found in Bolivia.
