= Amphicallia bellatrix =

Scientific classification
- Domain: Eukaryota
- Kingdom: Animalia
- Phylum: Arthropoda
- Class: Insecta
- Order: Lepidoptera
- Superfamily: Noctuoidea
- Family: Erebidae
- Subfamily: Arctiinae
- Genus: Amphicallia
- Species: A. bellatrix

Binomial name
- Amphicallia bellatrix (Dalman, 1823)

Synonyms
- Callimorpha bellatrix Dalman, 1823; Euchelia pardalina Herrich-Schäffer, [1854]

Species of moth

Amphicallia bellatrix is a moth of the subfamily Arctiinae first described by Johan Wilhelm Dalman in 1823. It is found in Kenya, Malawi, Mozambique, South Africa, Tanzania, Uganda and Zambia.

The larvae feed on Pinus patula and Crotalaria species.
