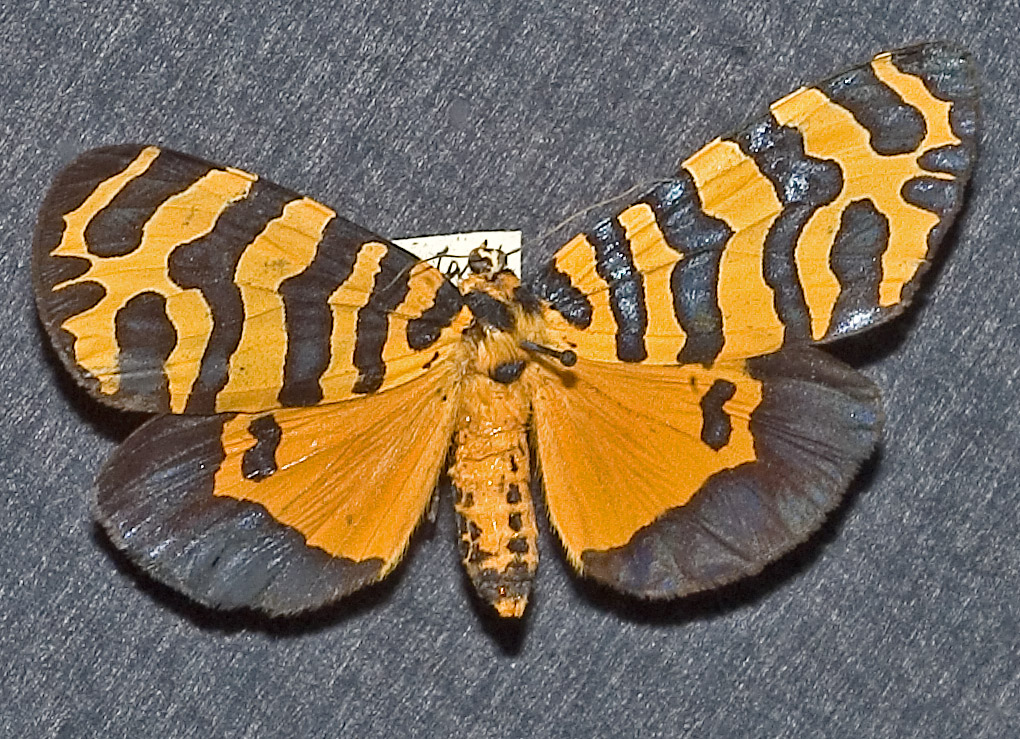
- Amphicallia thelwalli

Scientific classification
- Domain: Eukaryota
- Kingdom: Animalia
- Phylum: Arthropoda
- Class: Insecta
- Order: Lepidoptera
- Superfamily: Noctuoidea
- Family: Erebidae
- Subfamily: Arctiinae
- Tribe: Arctiini
- Subtribe: Incertae sedis
- Genus: Amphicallia; Aurivillius, 1900

= Amphicallia =

Genus of moths

Amphicallia is a genus of moths in the subfamily Arctiinae erected by Per Olof Christopher Aurivillius in 1900.

== Species ==
- Amphicallia bellatrix Dalman, 1823
- Amphicallia kostlani Strand, 1911
- Amphicallia pactolicus Butler, 1888
- Amphicallia pratti Kenrick, 1914
- Amphicallia quagga Strand, 1909
- Amphicallia solai Druce, 1907
- Amphicallia thelwalli Druce, 1882
  - A. t. thelwalli
  - A. t. tigris Butler, 1892
  - A. t. zebra Rogenhofer, 1894
