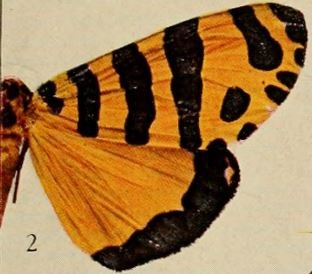

Scientific classification
- Domain: Eukaryota
- Kingdom: Animalia
- Phylum: Arthropoda
- Class: Insecta
- Order: Lepidoptera
- Superfamily: Noctuoidea
- Family: Erebidae
- Subfamily: Arctiinae
- Genus: Amphicallia
- Species: A. pactolicus

Binomial name
- Amphicallia pactolicus (Butler, 1888)

Synonyms
- Pleretes pactolicus Butler, 1888

= Amphicallia pactolicus =

Species of moth

Amphicallia pactolicus is a moth of the subfamily Arctiinae first described by Arthur Gardiner Butler in 1888. It is found in Cameroon, the Democratic Republic of the Congo, Kenya, Nigeria, Rwanda, Tanzania, Togo and Uganda.

The larvae feed on Crotalaria species.
