= Diospage semimarginata =

Scientific classification
- Domain: Eukaryota
- Kingdom: Animalia
- Phylum: Arthropoda
- Class: Insecta
- Order: Lepidoptera
- Superfamily: Noctuoidea
- Family: Erebidae
- Subfamily: Arctiinae
- Genus: Diospage
- Species: D. semimarginata

Binomial name
- Diospage semimarginata Rothschild, 1909

Species of moth

Diospage semimarginata is a moth of the subfamily Arctiinae. It was described by Rothschild in 1909. It is found in Ecuador.
