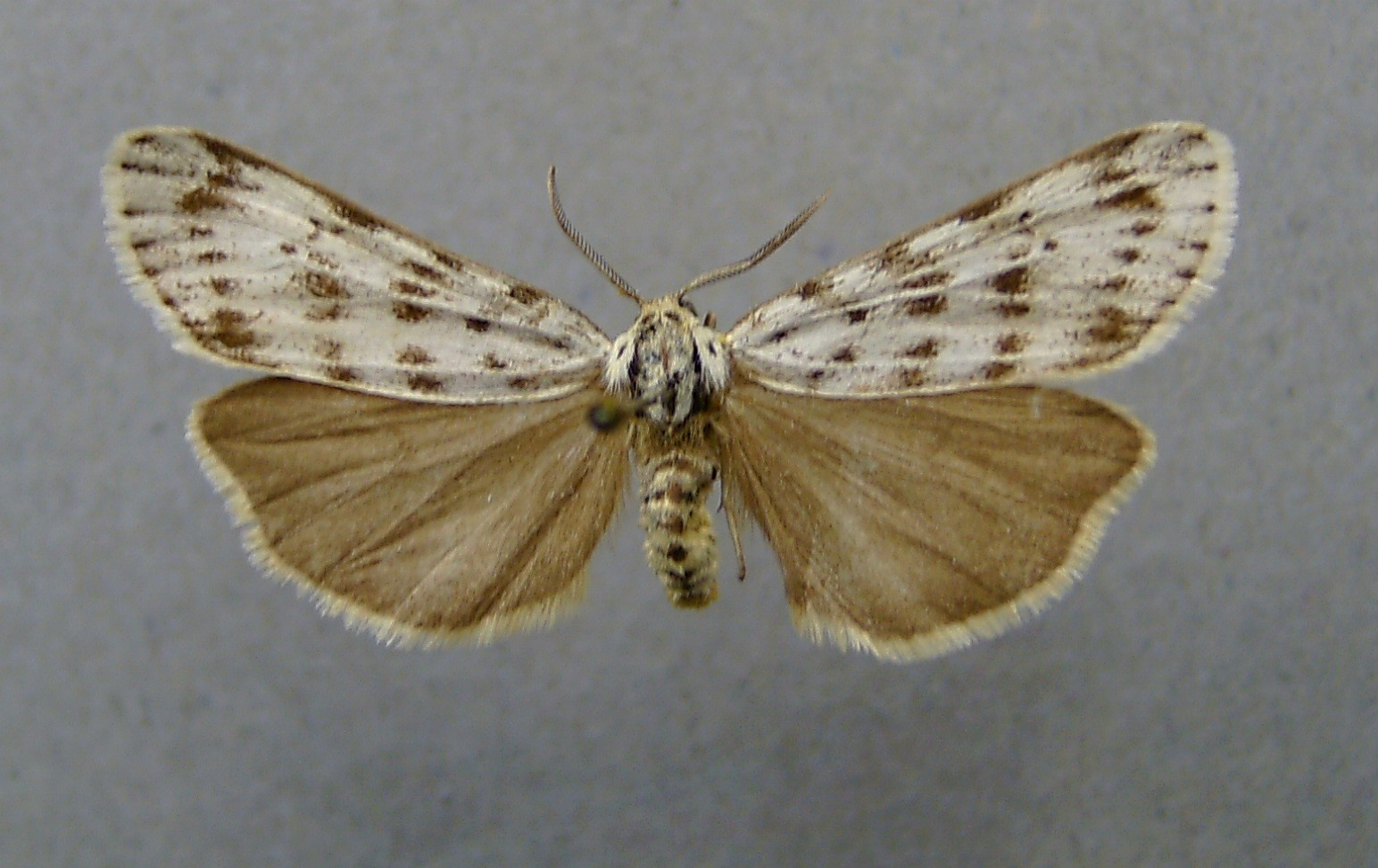
- Coscinia cribraria

Scientific classification
- Kingdom: Animalia
- Phylum: Arthropoda
- Clade: Pancrustacea
- Class: Insecta
- Order: Lepidoptera
- Superfamily: Noctuoidea
- Family: Erebidae
- Subfamily: Arctiinae
- Subtribe: Callimorphina
- Genus: Coscinia; Hübner, 1819

Synonyms
- Eucoscinia Leraut, 1993 (preocc. by Pornell, 1872); Lerautia Koçak & Kemal, 2006

= Coscinia =

Genus of moths

Coscinia is a genus of tiger moths in the family Erebidae. The genus was erected by Jacob Hübner in 1819.

== Species ==
- Coscinia bifasciata (Rambur, 1832)
- Coscinia cribraria (Linnaeus, 1758)
- Coscinia liouvillei Le Cerf, 1928
- Coscinia libyssa (Püngeler, 1907)
- Coscinia mariarosae Expósito, 1991
- Coscinia romei Sagarra, 1924

=== Species formerly placed in Coscinia ===
- Spiris striata Linnaeus, 1758
  - Syn. Coscinia striata
