= Diospage rhebus =

Scientific classification
- Domain: Eukaryota
- Kingdom: Animalia
- Phylum: Arthropoda
- Class: Insecta
- Order: Lepidoptera
- Superfamily: Noctuoidea
- Family: Erebidae
- Subfamily: Arctiinae
- Genus: Diospage
- Species: D. rhebus

Binomial name
- Diospage rhebus (Cramer, 1779)

Synonyms
- Sphinx rhebus Cramer, [1779]

Species of moth

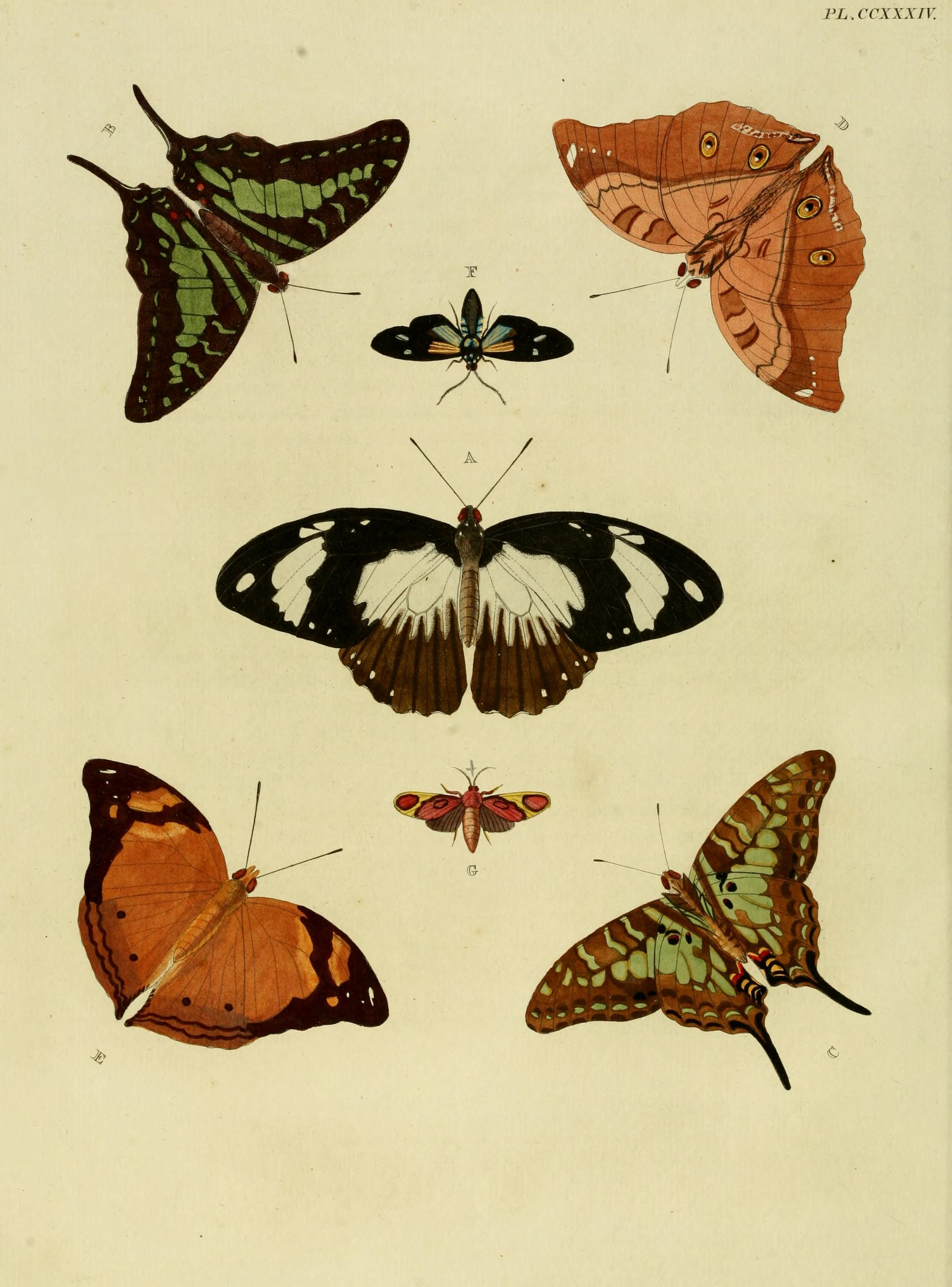

Diospage rhebus is a moth of the subfamily Arctiinae. It was described by Pieter Cramer in 1779. It is found in Venezuela, Brazil and Peru.
