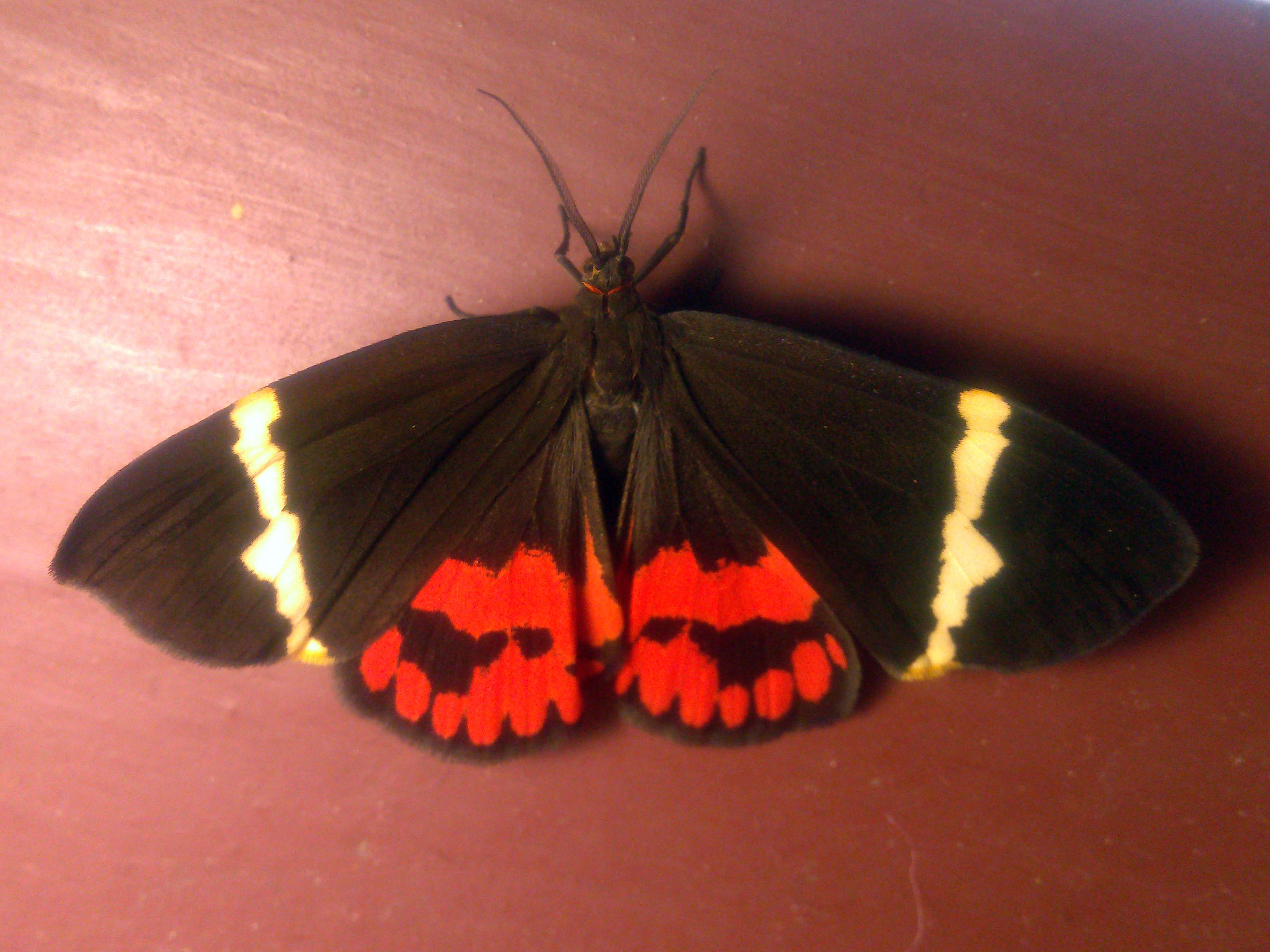

Scientific classification
- Kingdom: Animalia
- Phylum: Arthropoda
- Class: Insecta
- Order: Lepidoptera
- Superfamily: Noctuoidea
- Family: Erebidae
- Subfamily: Arctiinae
- Subtribe: Incertae sedis
- Genus: Curoba; Walker, [1865]
- Species: C. sangarida

Binomial name
- Curoba sangarida (Stoll, [1782])

Synonyms
- Phalaena sangarida Stoll, [1782]; Phalaena (Noctua) mopsa Drury, 1782; Curoba fasciata Walker, [1865]

= Curoba =

Genus of moths

Curoba is a monotypic moth genus in the subfamily Arctiinae erected by Francis Walker in 1865. It contains the single species Curoba sangarida, first described by Caspar Stoll in 1782, which is found in southern India and Sri Lanka.

== Description ==
Upperside: Antennae filiform and black. Thorax and abdomen chocolate, the latter edged with red. Anterior wings entirely of a dun chocolate colour, having a lemon-coloured streak crossing them from the lower corners to near the middle of the anterior edges. Posterior wings next the body almost black; the remainder carmine, with a waved black line crossing them from the upper to the abdominal corners.

Underside: Palpi grey. Breast red, with two black spots on each side. Legs grey. Wings coloured as on the upperside; the red colour on the inferior ones reaching to the body. Margins of the wings entire. Wingspan 1 3/4 inches (44 mm).

== Taxonomy ==
Curoba is not a member of Arctiidae, because females have no anal glands; according to male genitalia, it is related to a noctuid subfamily Eligminae.

== Gallery ==
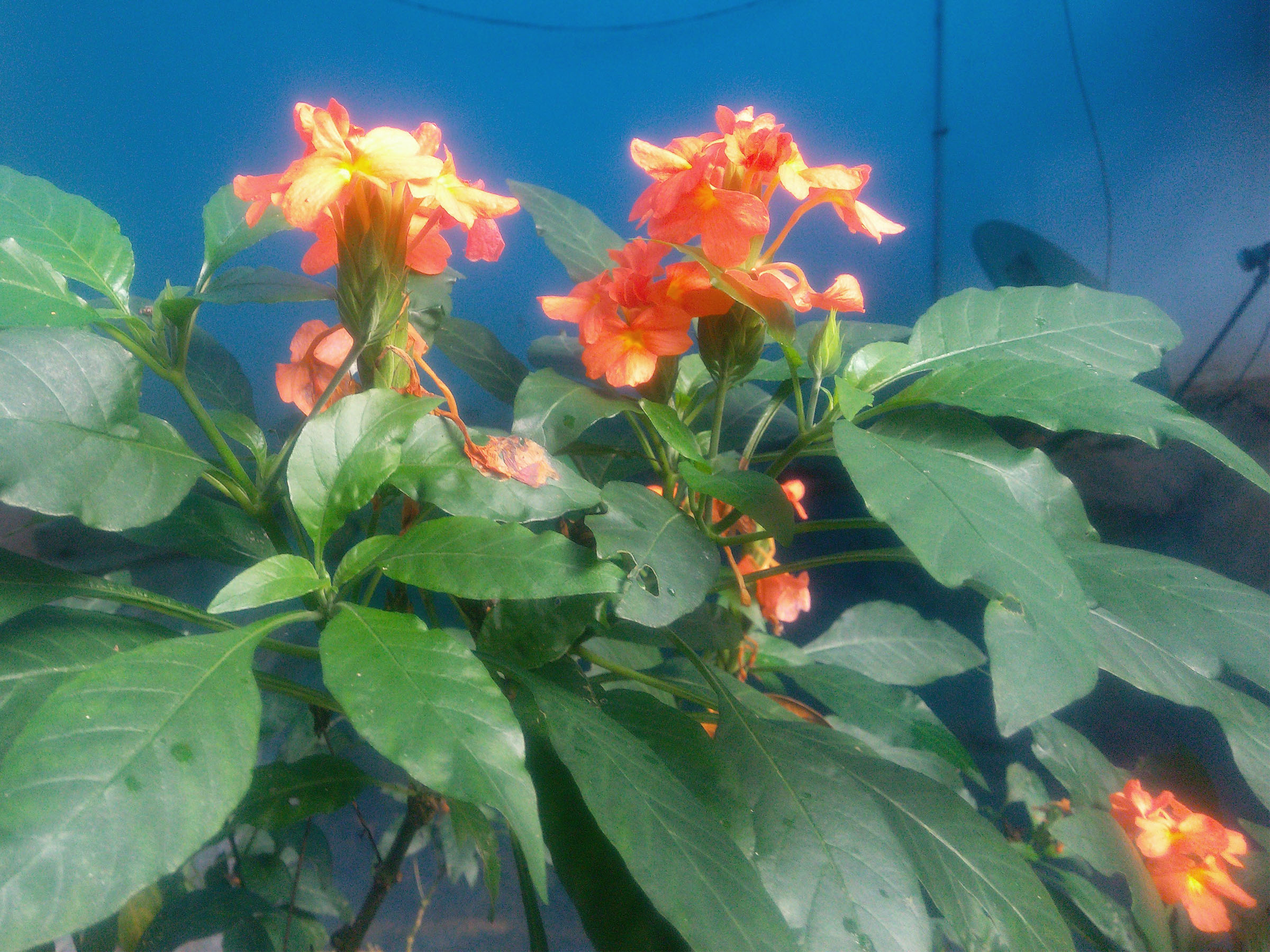
Hostplant: Crossandra infundibuliformis (firecracker flower)

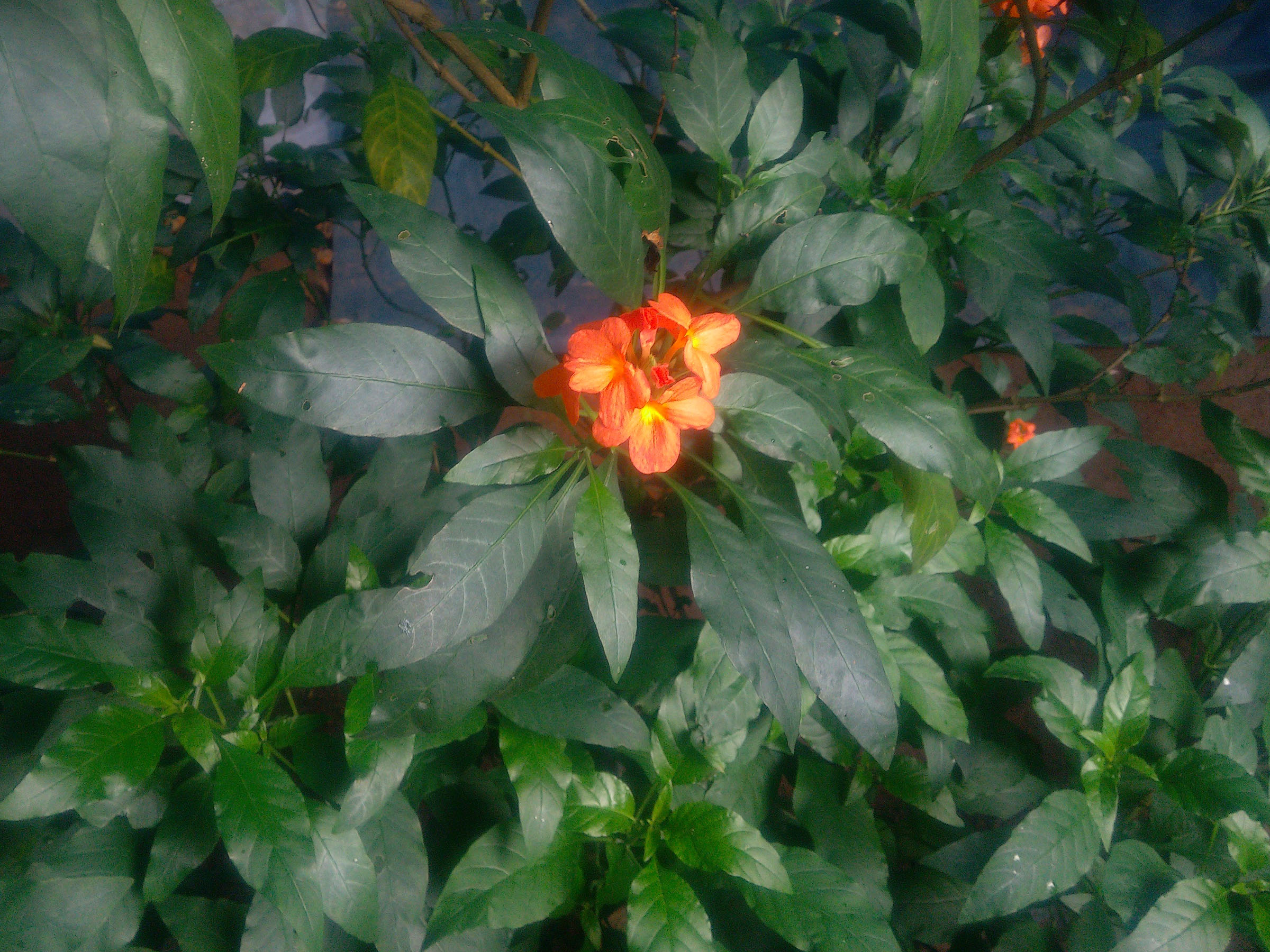
Hostplant: Crossandra infundibuliformis

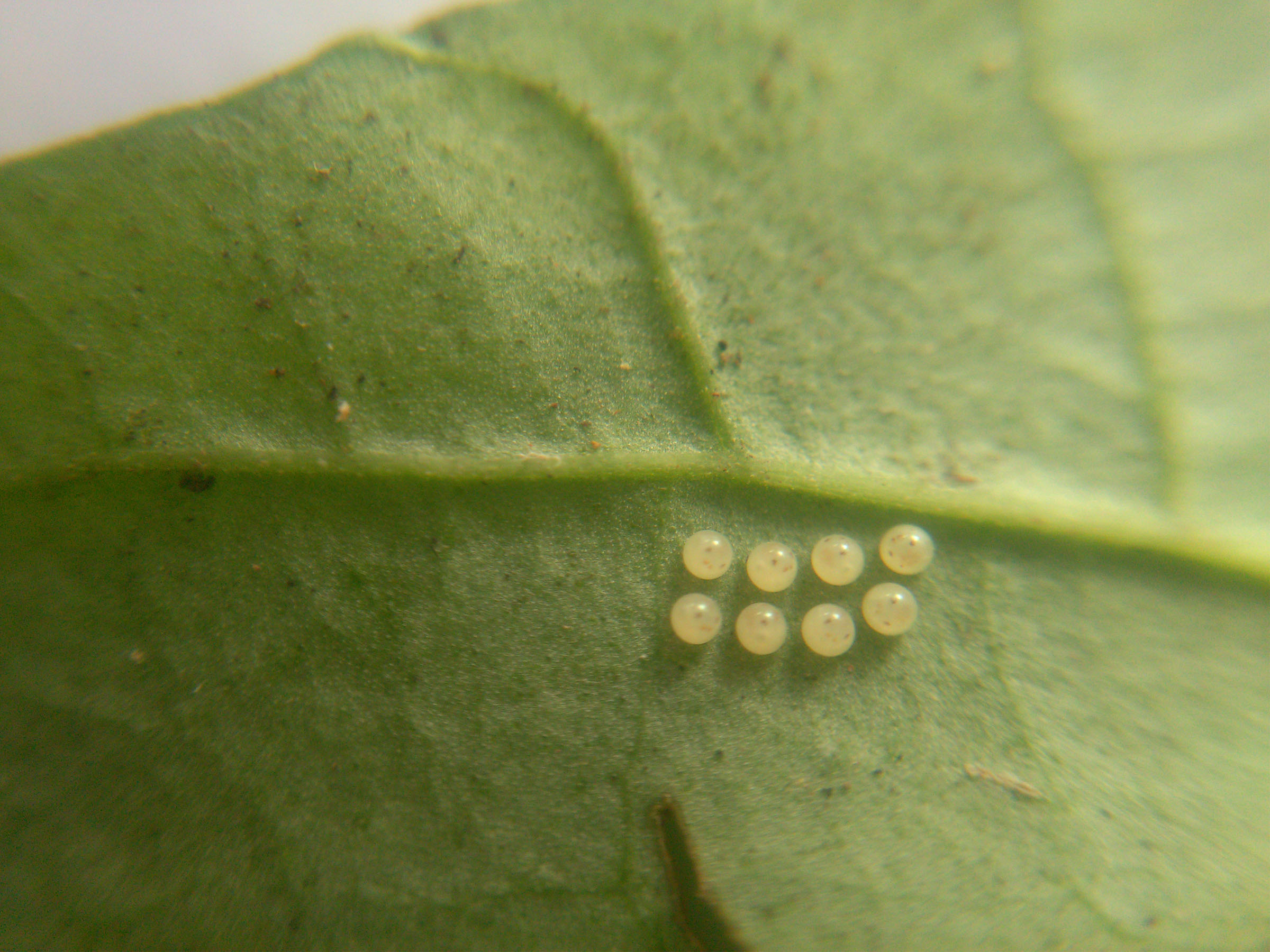
Eggs under the leaf

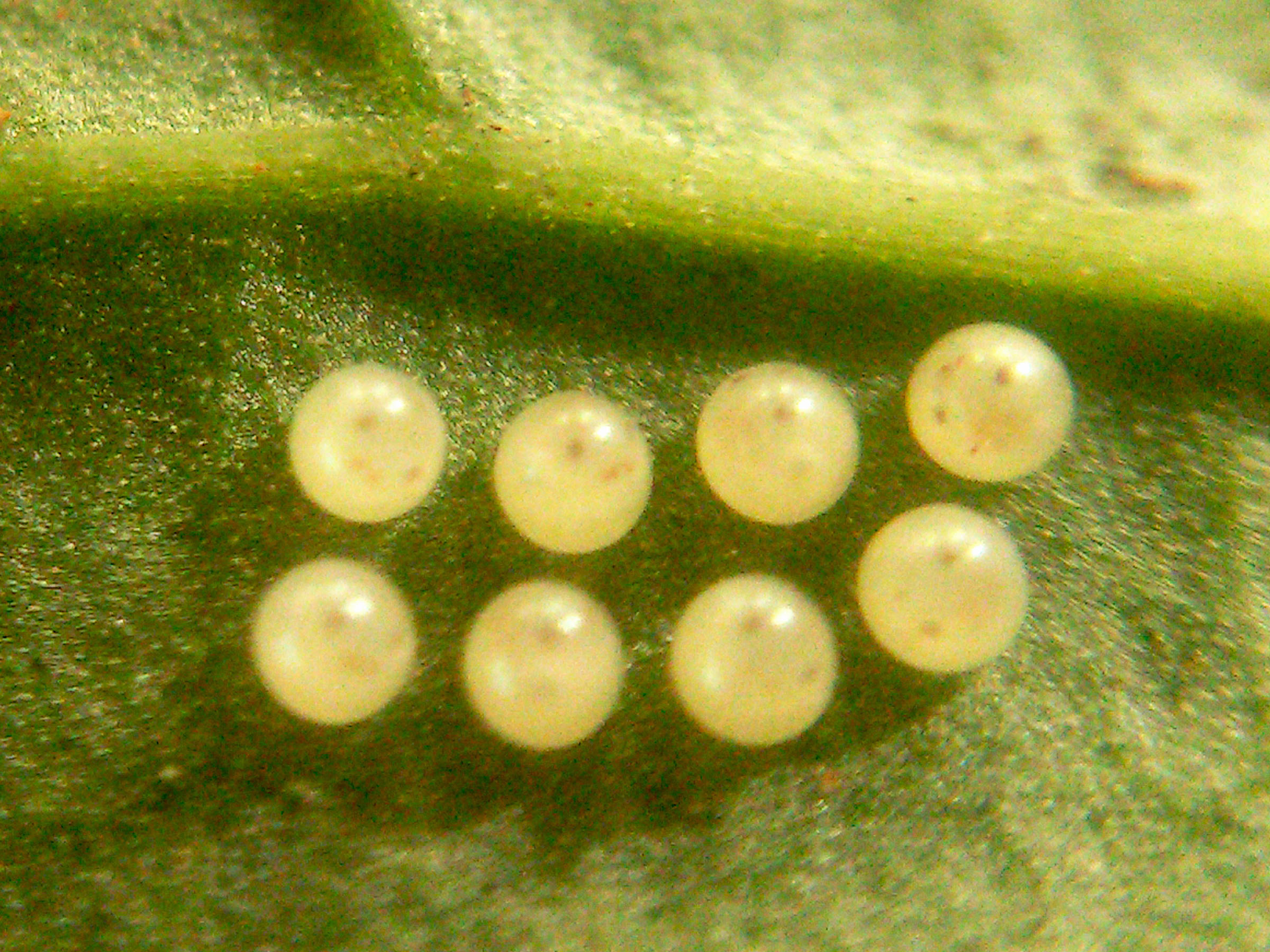
Eggs

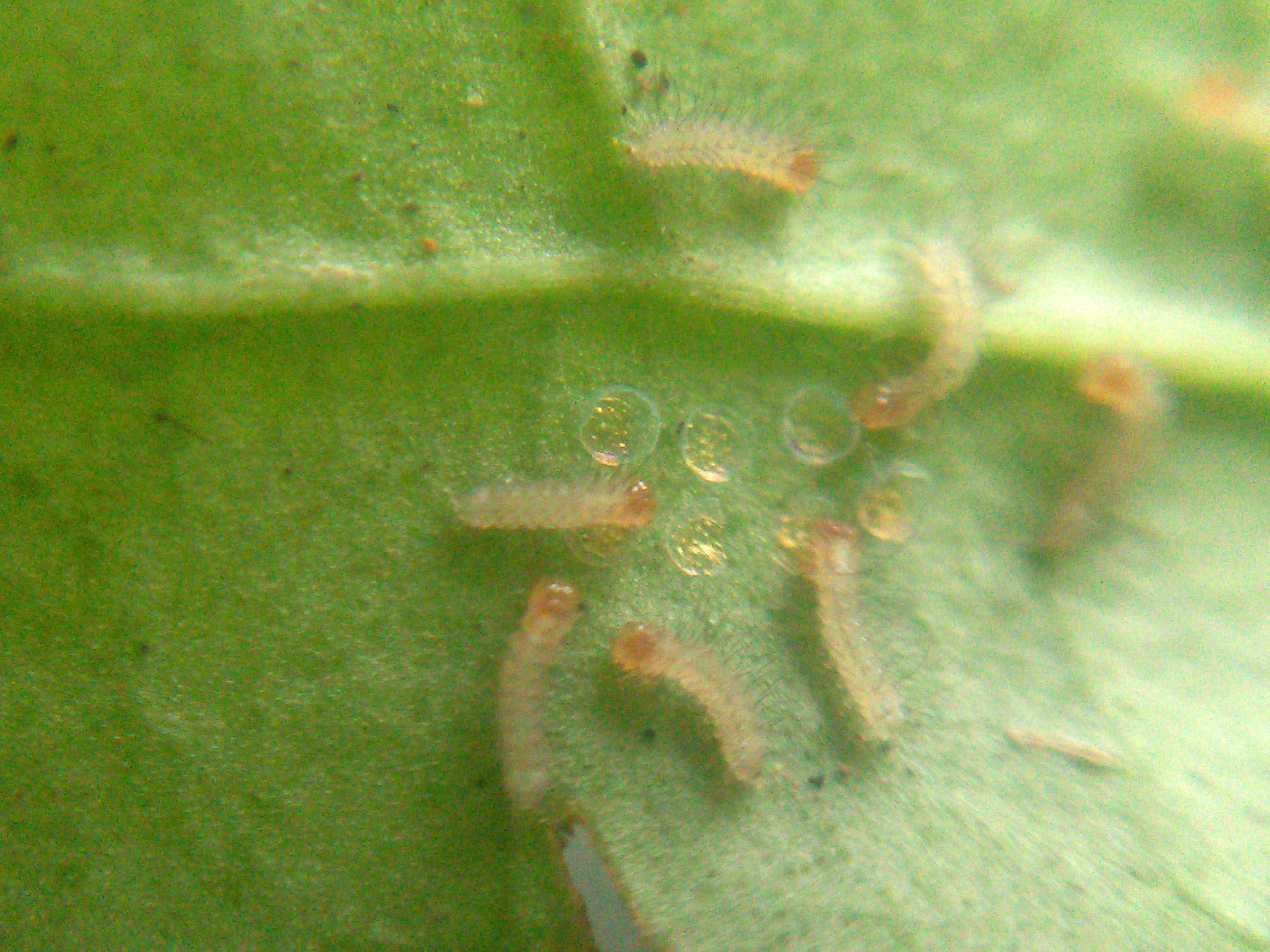
Emerging larva

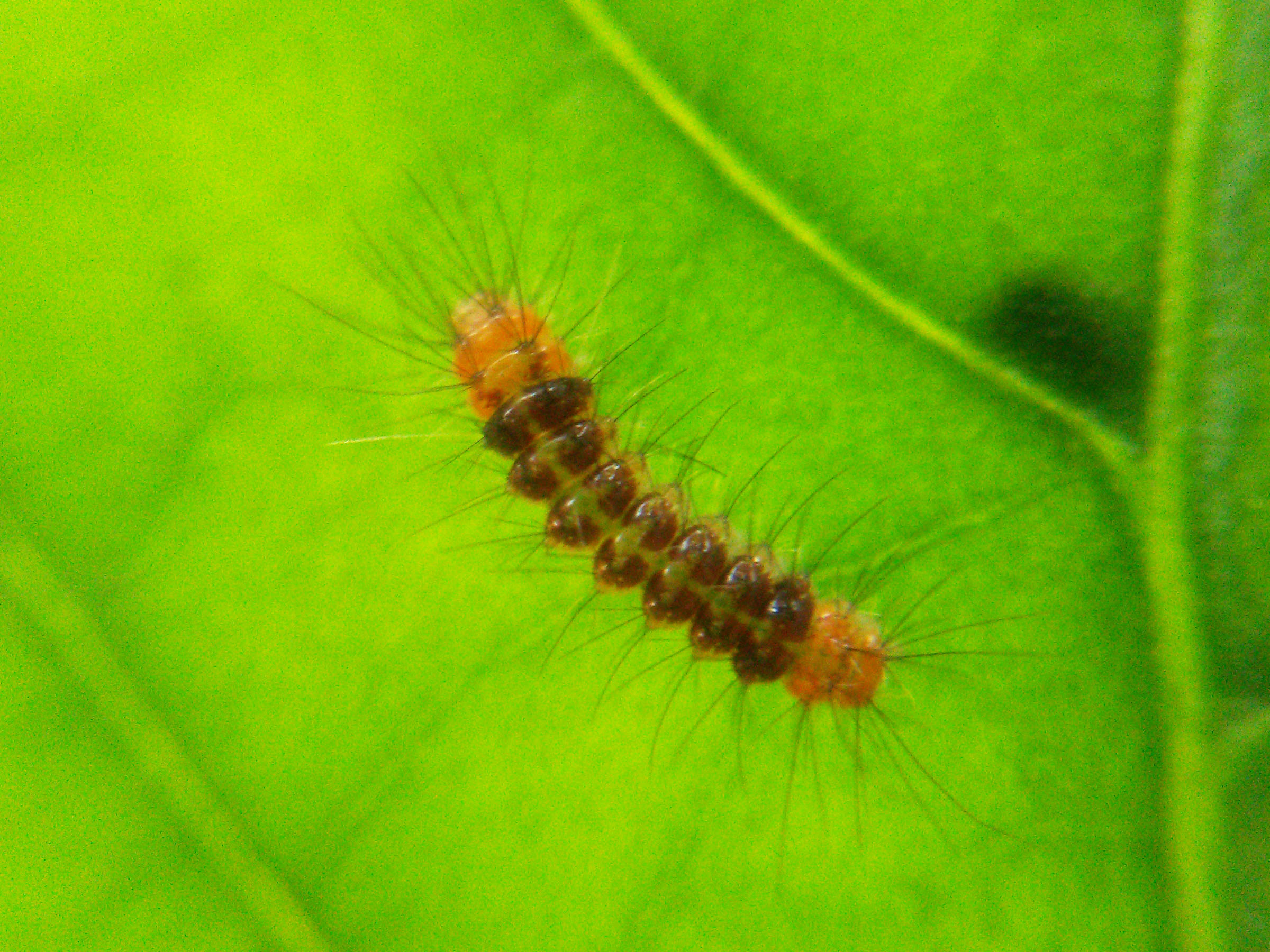
Larva

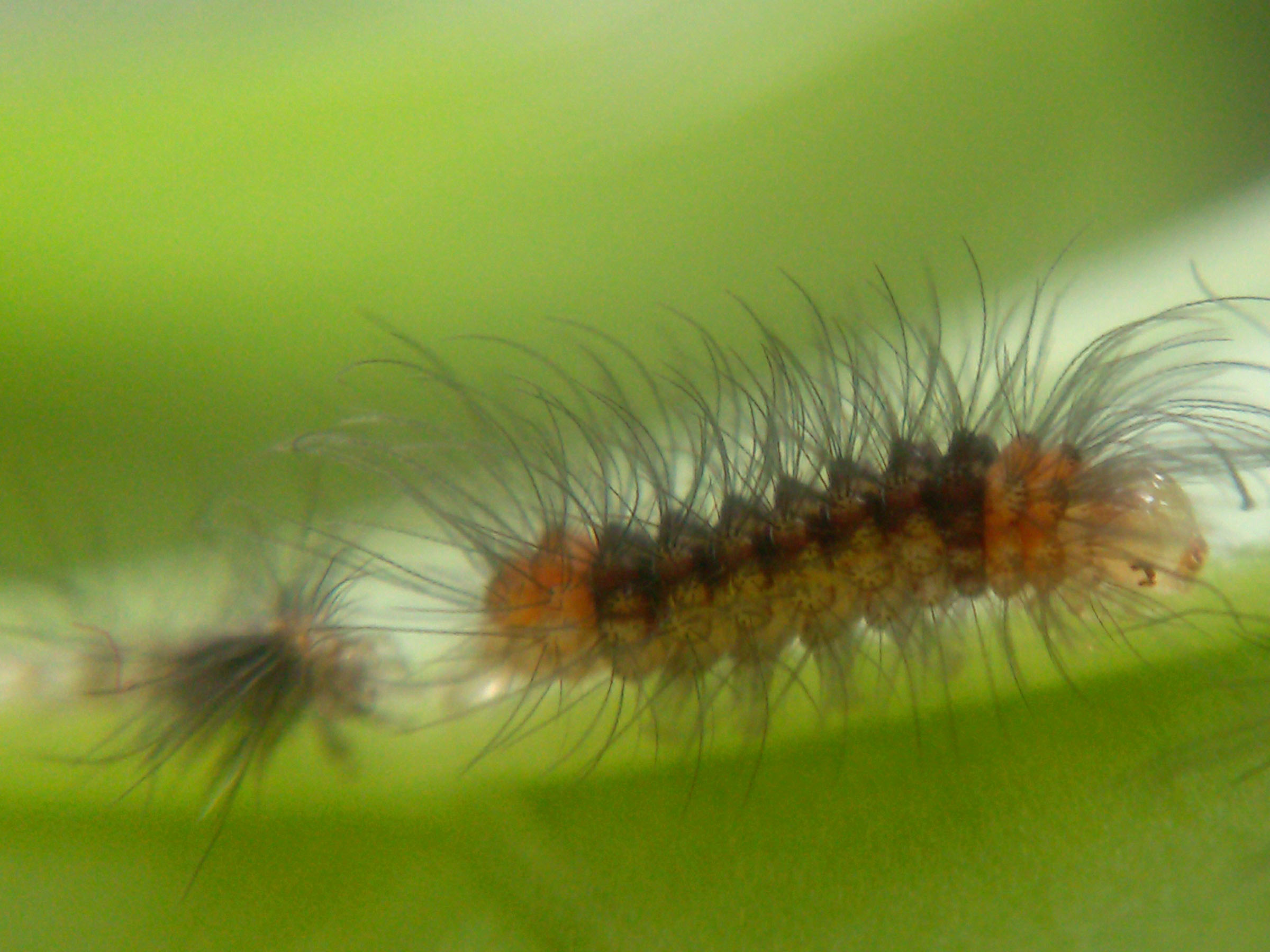
Larva

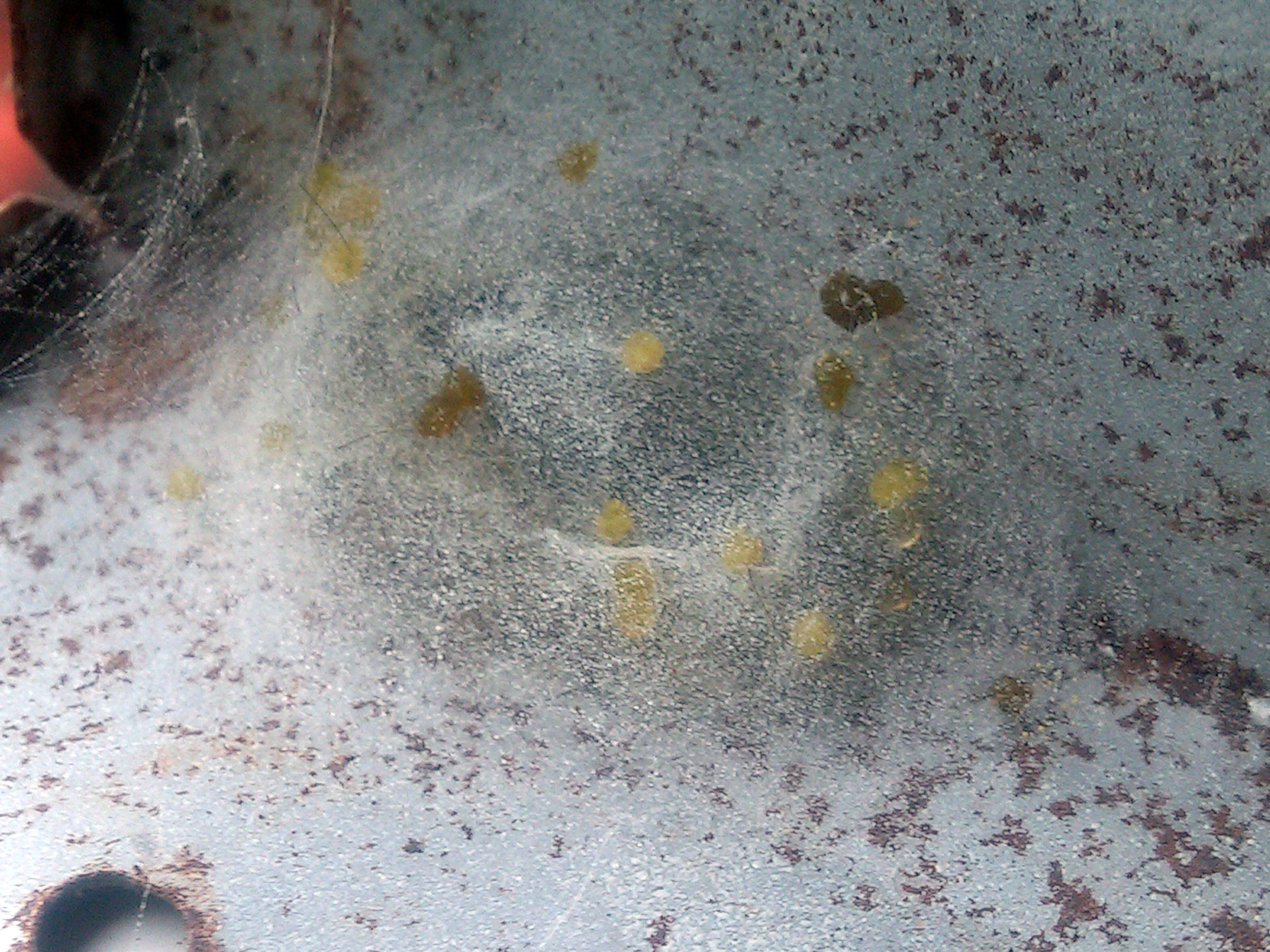
Pupa shell

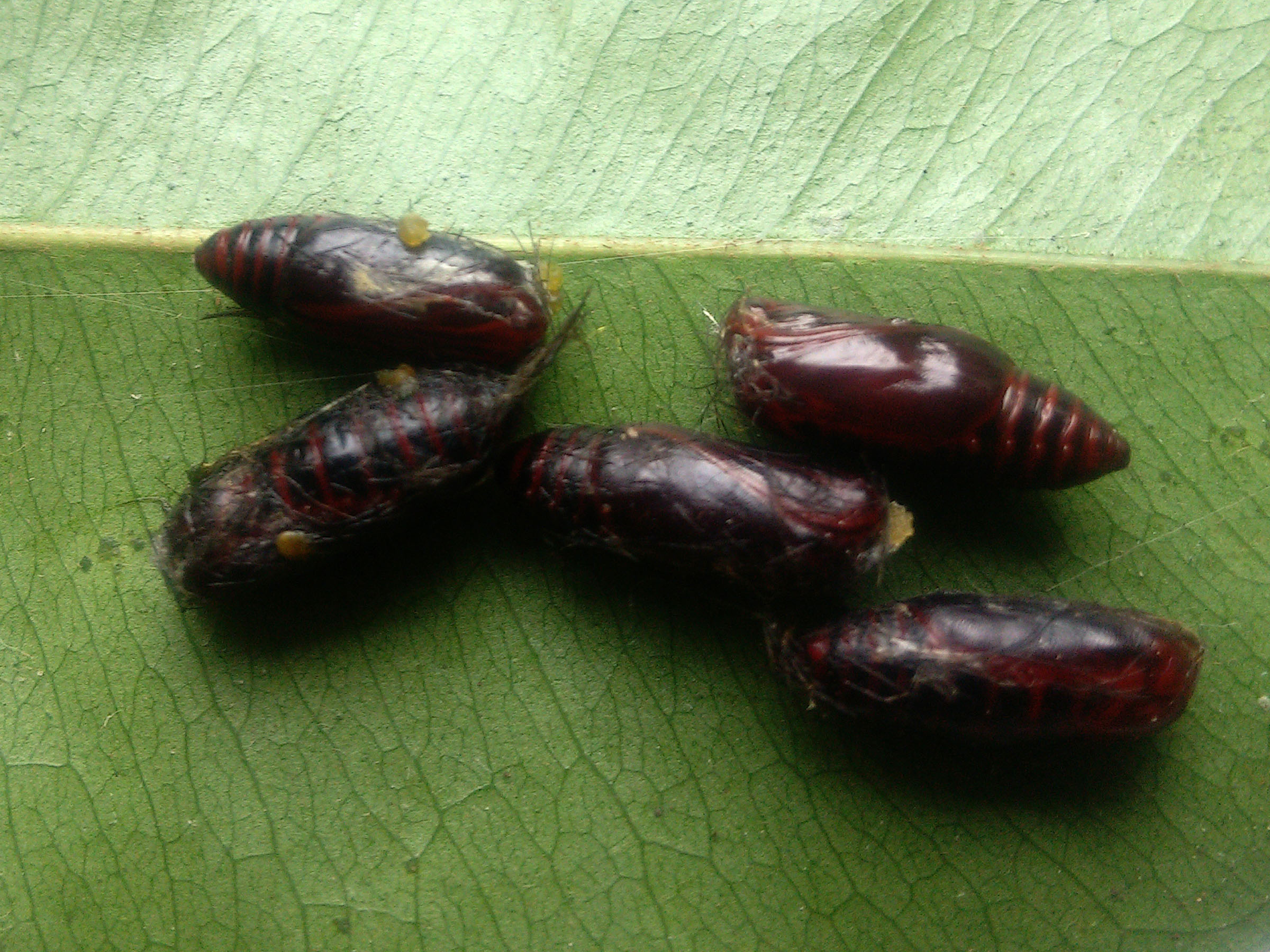
Pupa

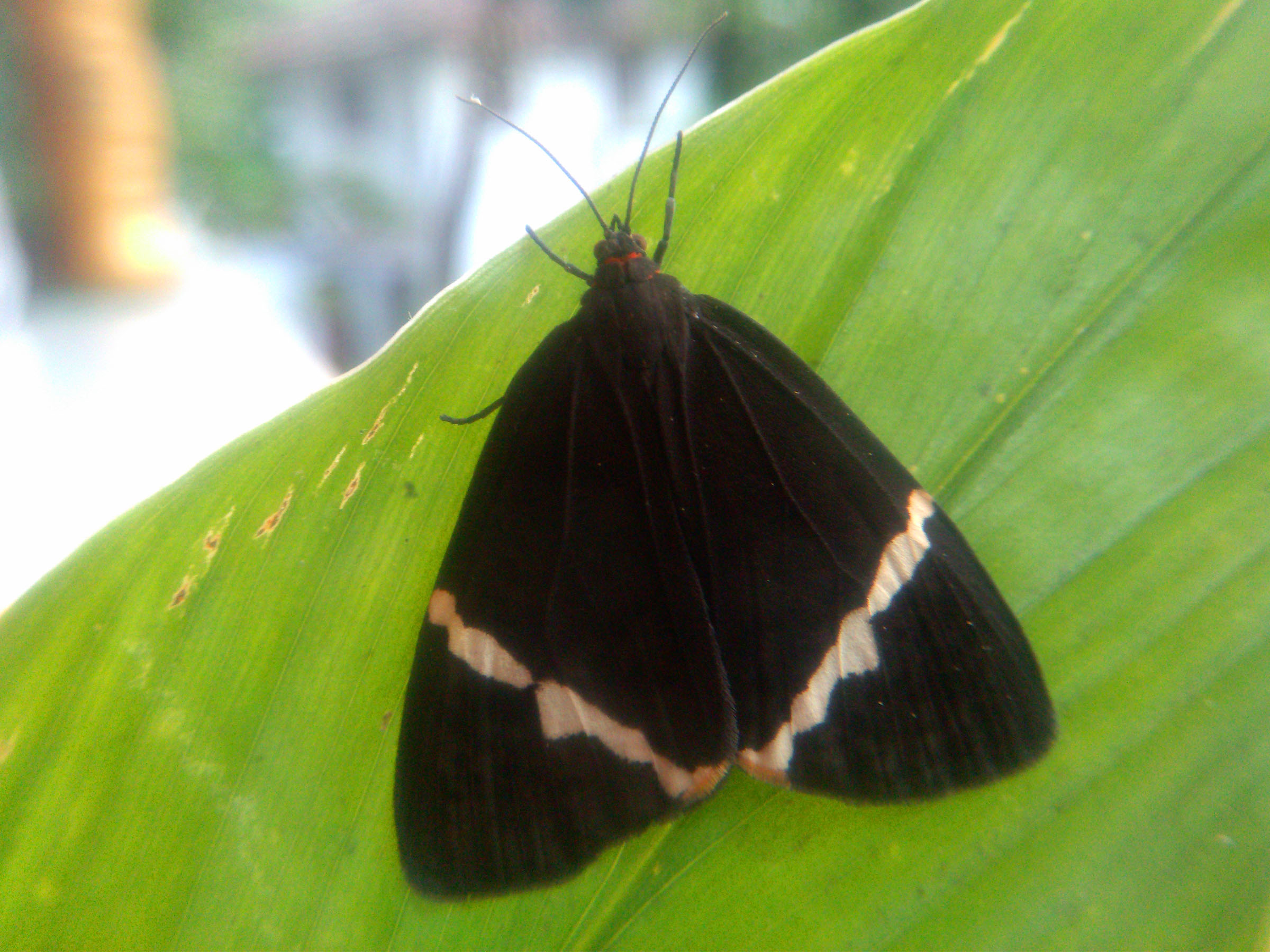
Upperside

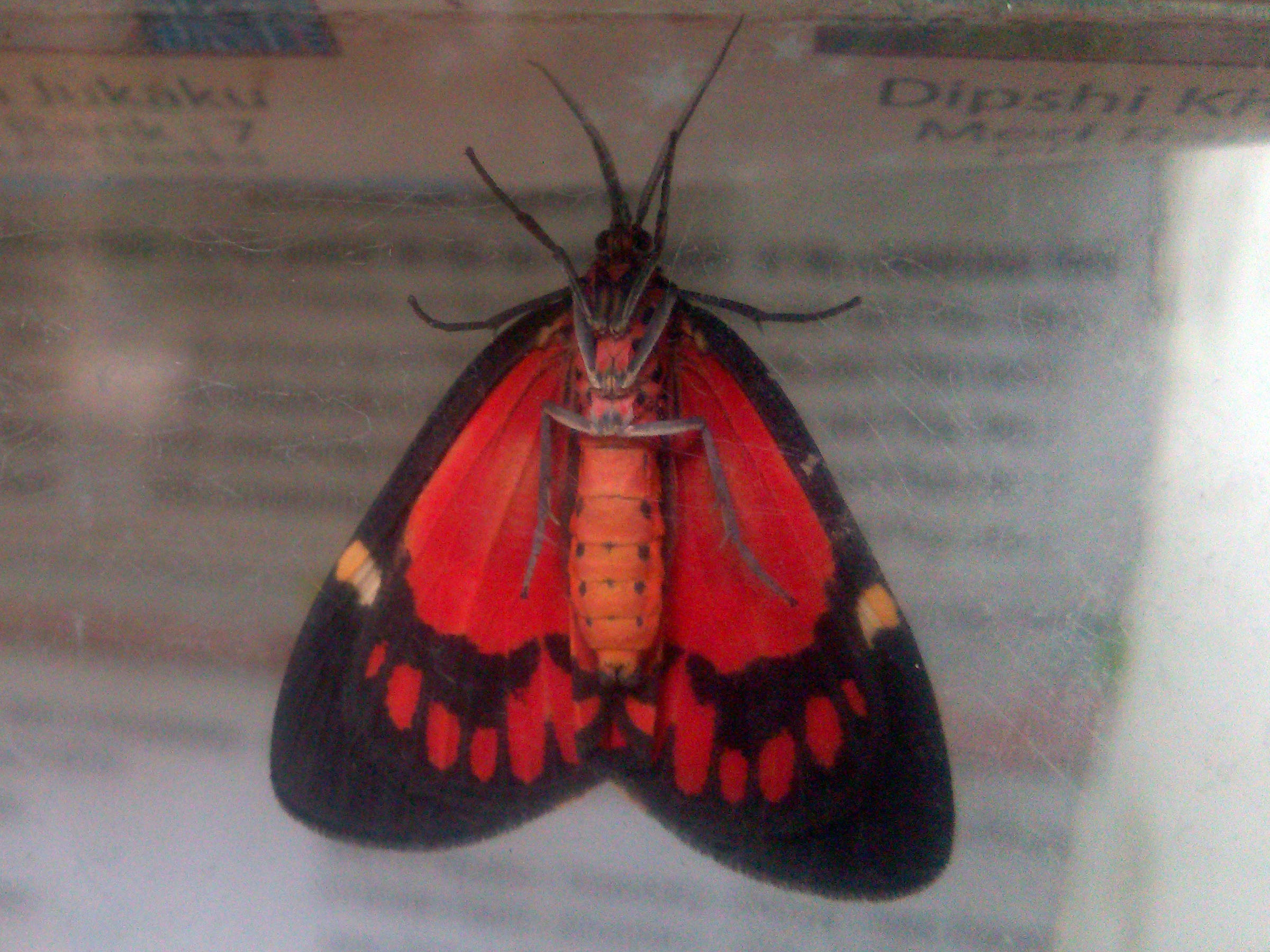
Underside

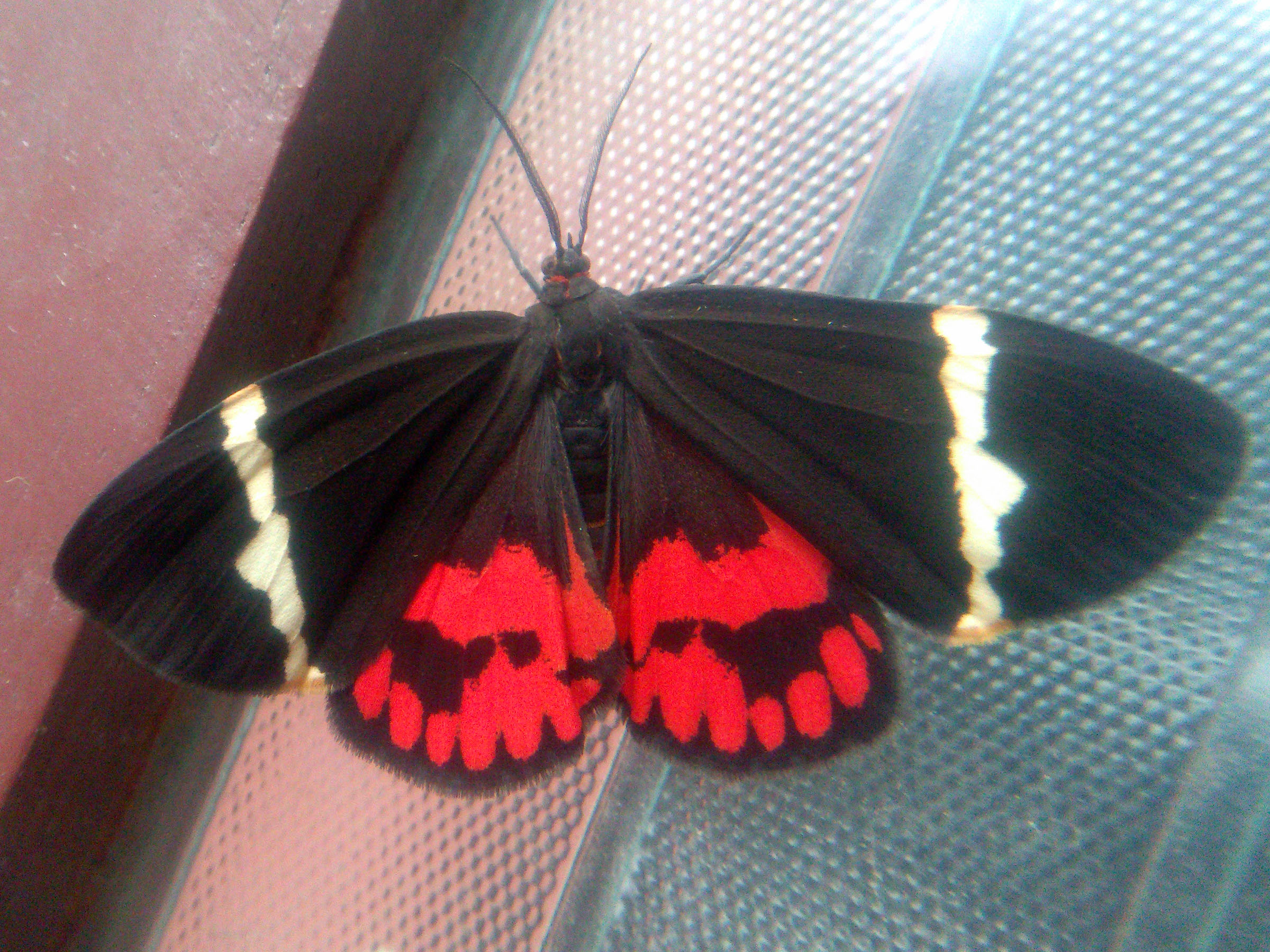
Open wings

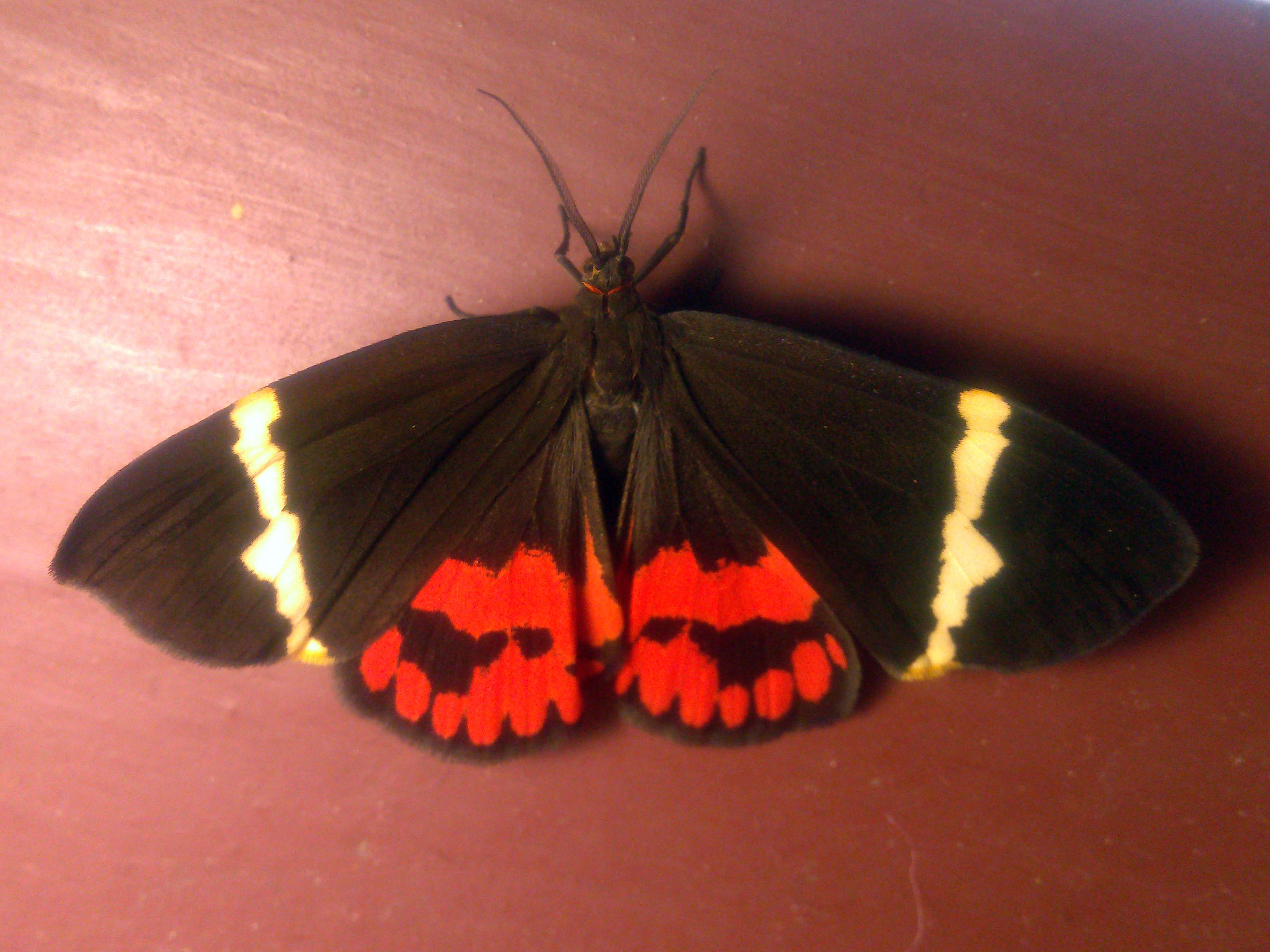
Open wings

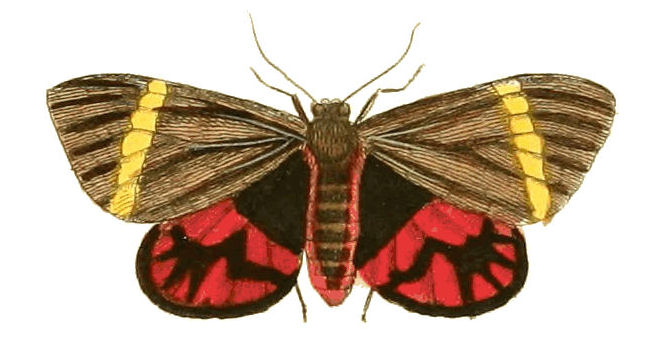
Illustration by Dru Drury
