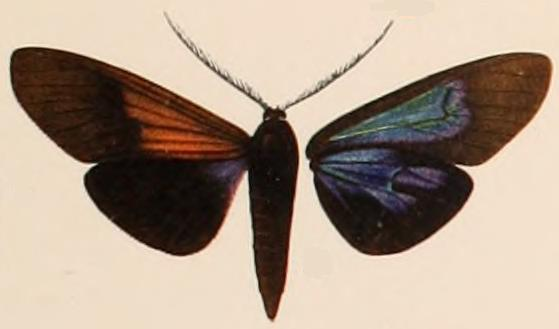

Scientific classification
- Domain: Eukaryota
- Kingdom: Animalia
- Phylum: Arthropoda
- Class: Insecta
- Order: Lepidoptera
- Superfamily: Noctuoidea
- Family: Erebidae
- Subfamily: Arctiinae
- Genus: Diospage
- Species: D. violitincta

Binomial name
- Diospage violitincta Rothschild, 1909

= Diospage violitincta =

Species of moth

Diospage violitincta is a moth of the subfamily Arctiinae first described by Rothschild in 1909. It is found in South America (the type location is Cauca-Tal).
