= Diospage splendens =

Burnet tiger

Scientific classification
- Kingdom: Animalia
- Phylum: Arthropoda
- Class: Insecta
- Order: Lepidoptera
- Superfamily: Noctuoidea
- Family: Erebidae
- Subfamily: Arctiinae
- Genus: Diospage
- Species: D. splendens

Binomial name
- Diospage splendens (H. Druce, 1895)

Synonyms
- Belemnia splendens H. Druce, 1895

Species of moth

Diospage splendens, the Burnet tiger, is a moth of the subfamily Arctiinae. The species was first described by Herbert Druce in 1895. It is found in Ecuador, Peru and Bolivia.
