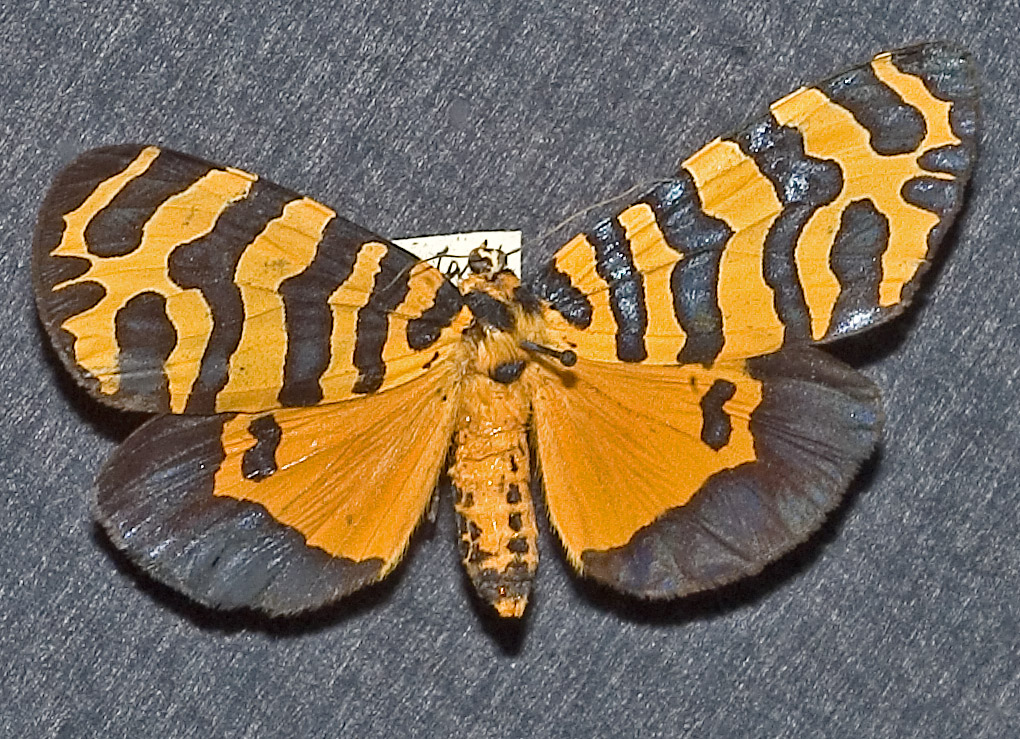

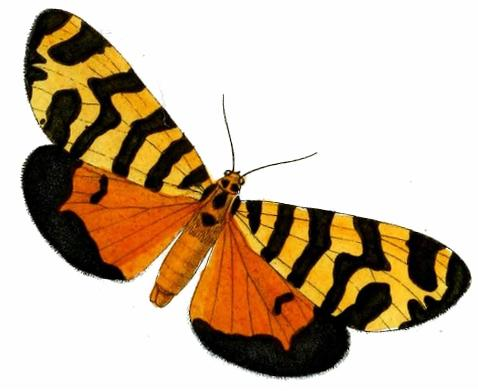

Scientific classification
- Domain: Eukaryota
- Kingdom: Animalia
- Phylum: Arthropoda
- Class: Insecta
- Order: Lepidoptera
- Superfamily: Noctuoidea
- Family: Erebidae
- Subfamily: Arctiinae
- Genus: Amphicallia
- Species: A. thelwalli

Binomial name
- Amphicallia thelwalli (H. Druce, 1882)

Synonyms
- Hypercompe thelwalli H. Druce, 1882; Callimorpha incomparabilis Mabille, 1891; Hypercompa tigris Butler, 1883; Callimorpha zebra Rogenhofer, 1894

= Amphicallia thelwalli =

Species of moth

Amphicallia thelwalli is a moth of the subfamily Arctiinae first described by Herbert Druce in 1882. It is found in south-eastern Africa.

The wingspan is about 70 mm.

Larvae of subspecies tigris have been recorded on Crotalaria species.

== Subspecies ==
- Amphicallia thelwalli thelwalli (Malawi)
- Amphicallia thelwalli tigris (Butler, 1883) (Kenya, Uganda)
- Amphicallia thelwalli zebra (Rogenhofer, 1894) (Tanzania)
