= Omochroa =

Scientific classification
- Kingdom: Animalia
- Phylum: Arthropoda
- Clade: Pancrustacea
- Class: Insecta
- Order: Lepidoptera
- Superfamily: Noctuoidea
- Family: Erebidae
- Subfamily: Arctiinae
- Tribe: Arctiini
- Genus: Omochroa; Rambur, [1866]
- Species: O. spurca

Binomial name
- Omochroa spurca Rambur, 1866

Synonyms
- Homochroa Spuler, 1906

Genus of moths

Omochroa is a monotypic moth genus in the subfamily Arctiinae. Its only species, Omochroa spurca, was described from Andalusia. Both the genus and the species were first described by Jules Pierre Rambur in 1866. The type was not saved. The species has affinity with Coscinia romei Sagarra, 1924 (Toulgoët, 1981).
