= Franz Dannehl =

German entomologist

Franz Dannehl (7 February 1870, Rudolstadt – 1947) was a German entomologist who specialised in Lepidoptera. He was degree in Biology in 1894 in Berlin..

He was an insect dealer first in Bözen, then in Munich.

His private collection, mainly butterflies and moths from the German Tyrol is in Museo Civico di Zoologia, Rome, Zoologische Staatssammlung München in Munich and Museum für Naturkunde in Berlin.

According to Peter Levenda, Dannehl was a member of the occultist Thule Society, and joined the Nazi Party early on.

Dannehl also trained as a composer. According to Daniel Gregory Mason, "He studied composition in Brussels, Weimar, and Berlin"; a violin sonata is among music compositions of his that survive in score. Some of his songs were reviewed in The Monthly Musical Record (February 1, 1901, page 40) as containing "only slight interest" when performed in a concert at the time.
