= Eugene Rey =

German chemist, ornithologist, and entomologist

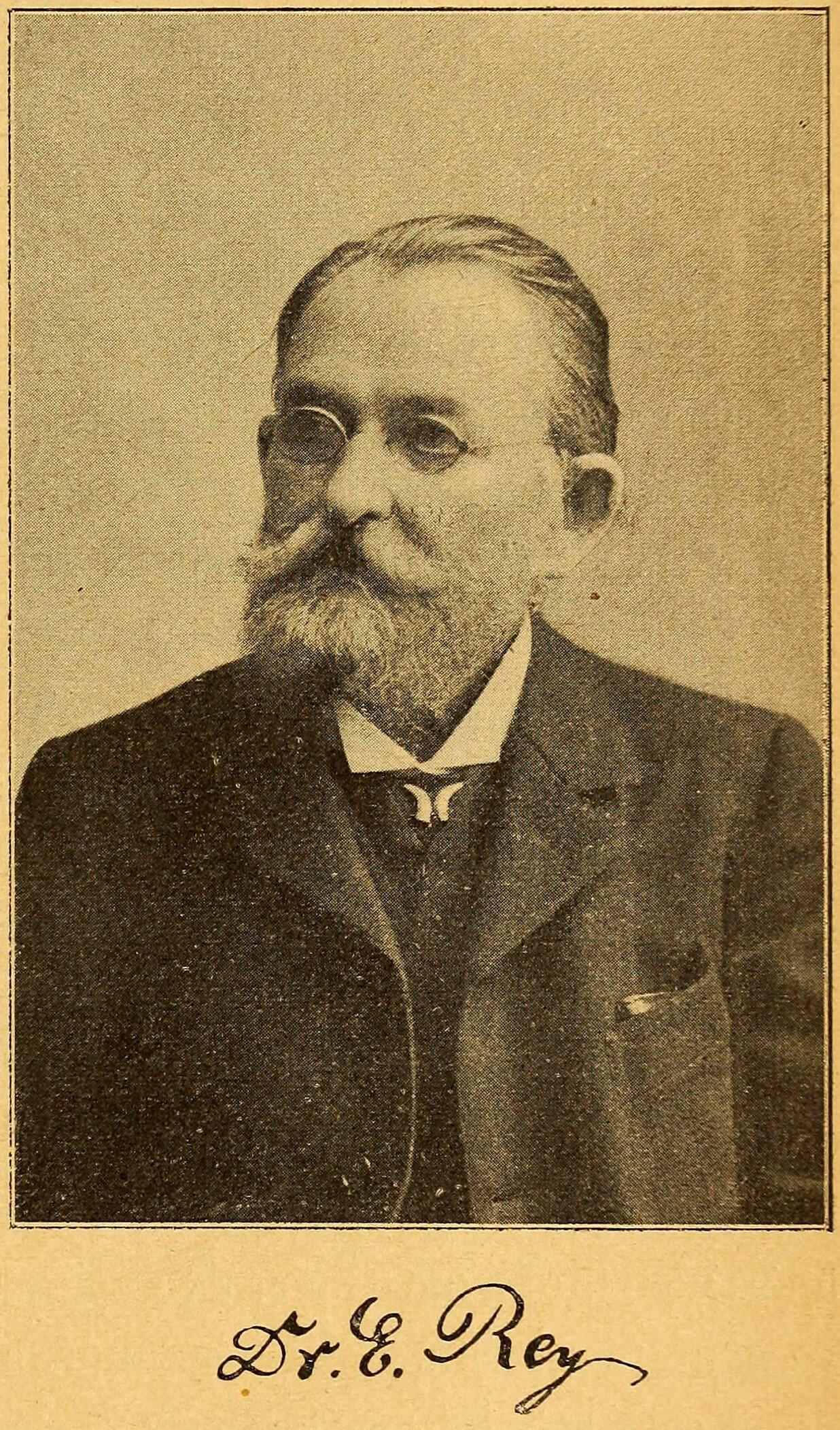
- Eugene Rey
- Born: Jean Guillaume Charles Eugène Rey; 17 February 1838; Berlin, Brandenburg, Prussia
- Died: 30 August 1909 (aged 71)
- Education: Heidelberg University
- Spouse: Josephine Bertha Clara

Jean Guillaume Charles Eugène Rey (17 February 1838 – 30 August 1909) was a German chemist, entomologist and ornithologist. He took a special interest in the eggs of birds, particularly those of parasitic cuckoos which bore a resemblance to the eggs of their hosts. He wrote a book on the cuckoos in 1892.

== Life and work ==
Rey was born in Berlin in a family with French Huguenot origins. He was educated at the Realschule in Halle and received a doctorate from Heidelberg University after which he worked as an industrial chemist at a lignite plant in Rattmannsdorf near Halle in 1863. He married Josephine Bertha Clara, daughter of his former warden, professor Grotjan. An introduction from August Carl Eduard Baldamus led to his move back to Halle to work on ornithology in association with professor Giebel and Taschenberg from 1868. He travelled to Spain and Portugal around 1869 and wrote on the birds of the Iberian peninsula.

Rey then began a natural history store (1874-1890) in Leipzig while also working at his factory. He founded the entomological association of Leipzig in 1875. Rey also was the founding chairperson for the ornithological association for Saxony and Thuringia in Halle in 1871. His major work was in oology and he wrote a two-volume book on the eggs of the birds of central Europe (Die Eier der Vögel Mitteleuropas, 1899). Another interest was in cuckoos and their eggs. From 1857, he built up a collection of nearly 16000 eggs representing 1768 species with nearly 500 of them representing about 17 cuckoo species. The collection was valued at 15000 Marks in the 1890s.

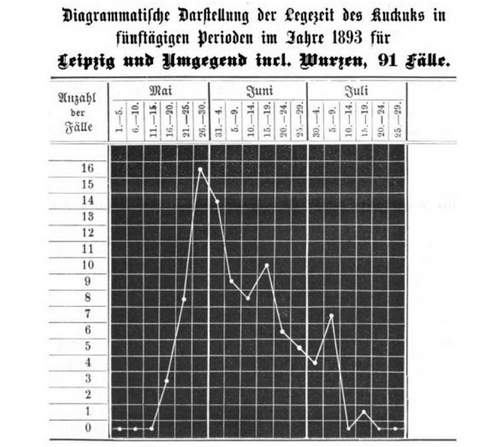
Seasonality of egg laying by cuckoos near Leipzig noted by Rey

Rey's major scientific contribution was on the study of cuckoos that he published in 1892. Here he noticed that each female cuckoo had distinctive patterning to their eggs and could be distinguished within their territories. Rey also guessed that a single female could lay only on alternate days. Rey however introduced an error, claiming that the European cuckoo laid an egg on the ground, and then transported it into the host nest in her bill. His studies inspired Edgar Chance to conduct his own more detailed observations.

Rey was noted for his perseverance in the field for making observations, often made by sitting near a nest under difficult weather conditions. He died from pneumonia following exposure in the field. He was buried on September 2, 1909 at the Leipzig South Cemetery.
