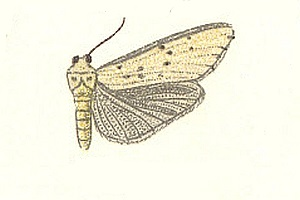

Scientific classification
- Domain: Eukaryota
- Kingdom: Animalia
- Phylum: Arthropoda
- Class: Insecta
- Order: Lepidoptera
- Superfamily: Noctuoidea
- Family: Erebidae
- Subfamily: Arctiinae
- Genus: Coscinia
- Species: C. libyssa

Binomial name
- Coscinia libyssa (Püngeler, 1907)

Synonyms
- Euprepia libyssa Püngeler, 1907; Emydia (Coscinia) powelli Oberthür, 1907; Emydia (Coscinia) powelli var. haroldi Oberthür, 1907; Eyprepia caligans Turati, 1907; Coscinia caligans

= Coscinia libyssa =

Species of moth

Coscinia libyssa is a moth of the family Erebidae. It was described by Rudolf Püngeler in 1907. It is found on Sicily and in Algeria.

The wingspan is about 25 mm.

== Subspecies ==
- Coscinia lybissa lybissa (Algeria)
- Coscinia lybissa caligans Turati, 1907 (Sicily)
