= Joseph Pierre Rondou =

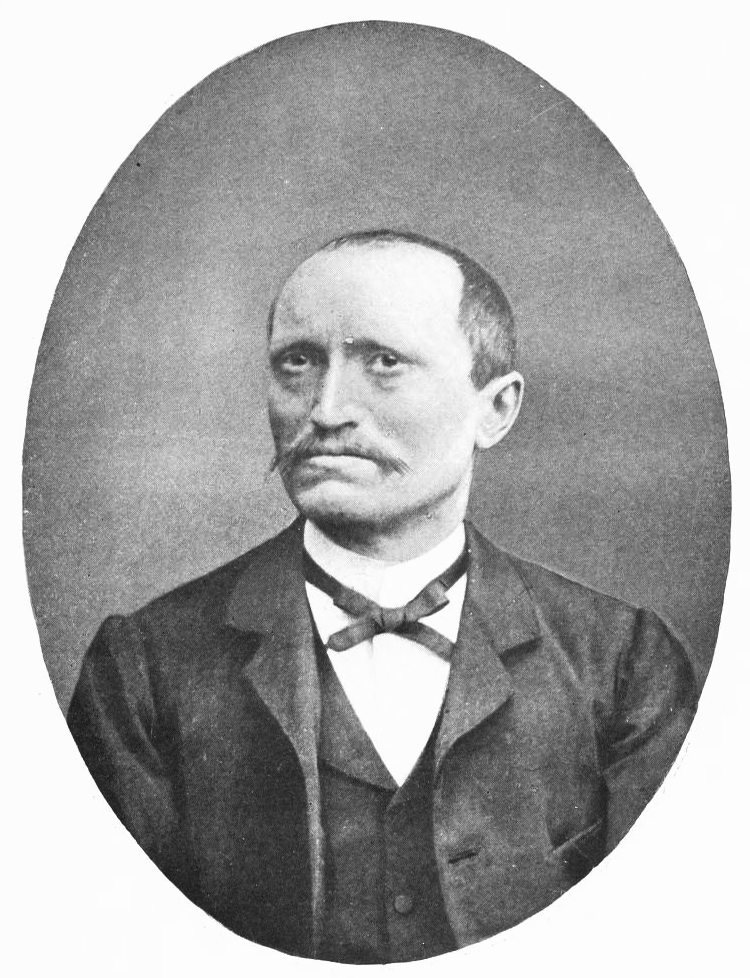
Joseph Pierre Rondou

Joseph Pierre Rondou (6 June 1860, Gèdre – 1935) was a French entomologist who specialised in Lepidoptera.

== Works ==
partial list Rondou, J.P., Catalogue des Lepidoptères des Pyrenées. Ann. Soc. ent. France 1932–1935. Concerns especially the Hautes-Pyrénées. Also bound as a book.
