= Coscinia romeii =

Scientific classification
- Domain: Eukaryota
- Kingdom: Animalia
- Phylum: Arthropoda
- Class: Insecta
- Order: Lepidoptera
- Superfamily: Noctuoidea
- Family: Erebidae
- Subfamily: Arctiinae
- Genus: Coscinia
- Species: C. romeii

Binomial name
- Coscinia romeii Sagarra, 1924

Synonyms
- Coscinia romei

Species of moth

Coscinia romeii is a moth of the family Erebidae. It was described by Ignacio de Sagarra in 1924. It is found in Spain.

The wingspan is 24–32 mm. Adults are on wing in September.

The larvae feed on Stipa and Brachypodium species. Larvae can be found from October to June.
