= Melora amygdaloides =

Scientific classification
- Kingdom: Animalia
- Phylum: Arthropoda
- Class: Insecta
- Order: Lepidoptera
- Superfamily: Noctuoidea
- Family: Erebidae
- Subfamily: Arctiinae
- Tribe: Arctiini
- Subtribe: Incertae sedis
- Genus: Melora; Walker, 1855
- Species: M. amygdaloides

Binomial name
- Melora amygdaloides Walker, 1855

Species of moth

Melora is a monotypic moth genus in the subfamily Arctiinae. Its single species, Melora amygdaloides, is found in Brazil. Both the genus and species were first described by Francis Walker in 1855.
