= Euceriodes pallada =

Scientific classification
- Domain: Eukaryota
- Kingdom: Animalia
- Phylum: Arthropoda
- Class: Insecta
- Order: Lepidoptera
- Superfamily: Noctuoidea
- Family: Erebidae
- Subfamily: Arctiinae
- Genus: Euceriodes
- Species: E. pallada

Binomial name
- Euceriodes pallada H. Druce, 1906

Species of moth

Euceriodes pallada is a moth of the subfamily Arctiinae first described by Herbert Druce in 1906. It is found in Brazil.
