= Panachranta lirioleuca =

Scientific classification
- Kingdom: Animalia
- Phylum: Arthropoda
- Clade: Pancrustacea
- Class: Insecta
- Order: Lepidoptera
- Superfamily: Noctuoidea
- Family: Erebidae
- Subfamily: Arctiinae
- Tribe: Arctiini
- Genus: Panachranta; Turner, 1922
- Species: P. lirioleuca

Binomial name
- Panachranta lirioleuca Turner, 1922

Species of moth

Panachranta is a monotypic moth genus in the subfamily Arctiinae. Its only species, Panachranta lirioleuca, is found in Australia. Both the genus and species were first described by Alfred Jefferis Turner in 1922.
