= Talara pelopia =

Scientific classification
- Kingdom: Animalia
- Phylum: Arthropoda
- Class: Insecta
- Order: Lepidoptera
- Superfamily: Noctuoidea
- Family: Erebidae
- Subfamily: Arctiinae
- Genus: Talara
- Species: T. pelopia

Binomial name
- Talara pelopia H. Druce, 1885

Synonyms
- Propyria pelopia (H. Druce, 1885)

Species of moth

Talara pelopia is a moth in the subfamily Arctiinae. It was described by Herbert Druce in 1885. It is found in Panama.
