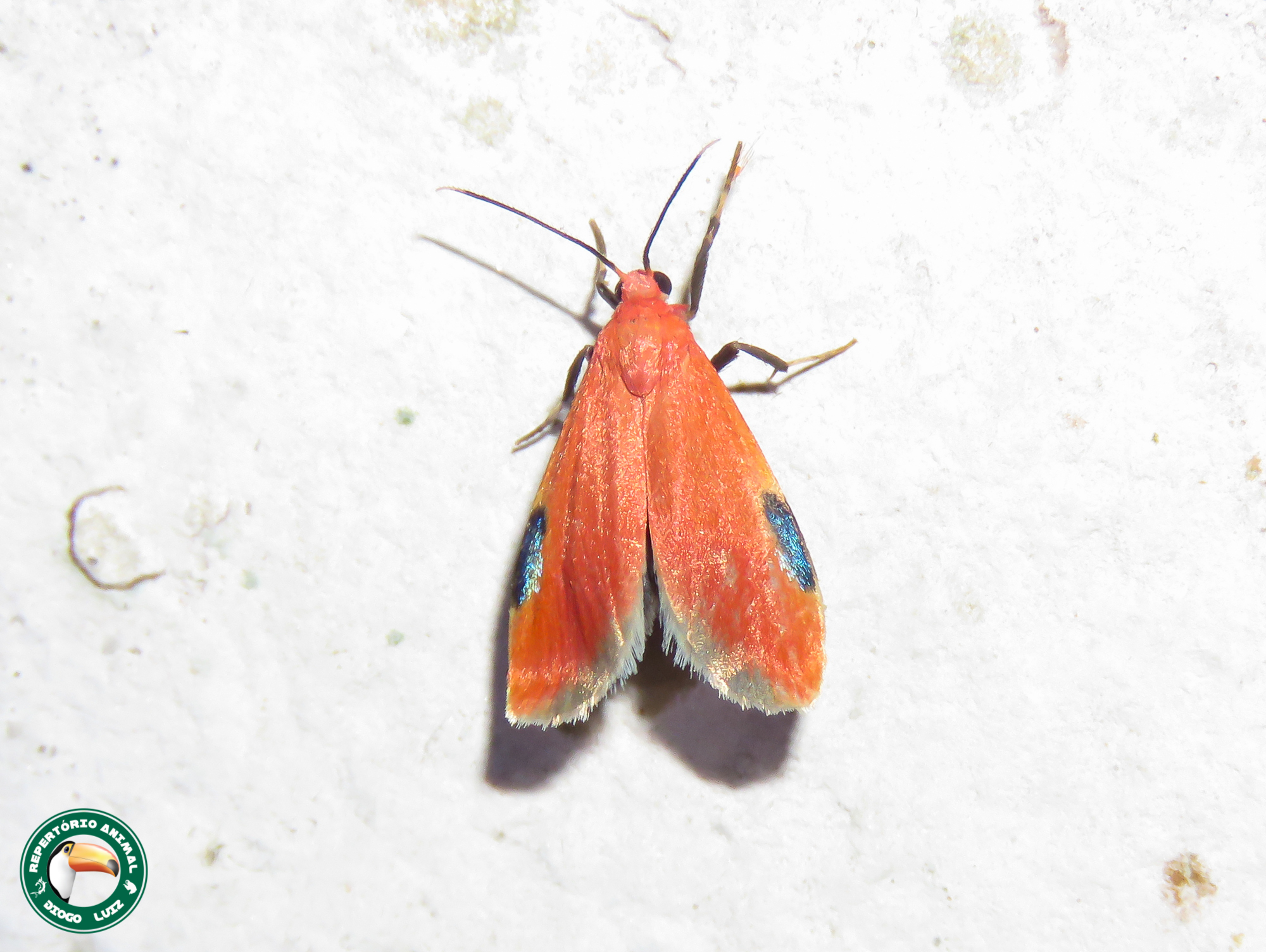
- Talara coccinea, Brasil

Scientific classification
- Domain: Eukaryota
- Kingdom: Animalia
- Phylum: Arthropoda
- Class: Insecta
- Order: Lepidoptera
- Superfamily: Noctuoidea
- Family: Erebidae
- Subfamily: Arctiinae
- Tribe: Lithosiini
- Genus: Talara
- Species: T. coccinea

Binomial name
- Talara coccinea Butler, 1877

= Talara coccinea =

Species of moth

Talara coccinea is a moth in the subfamily Arctiinae. It was described by Arthur Gardiner Butler in 1877. It is found in Panama and the Amazon region.
