= Talara megaspila =

Scientific classification
- Kingdom: Animalia
- Phylum: Arthropoda
- Class: Insecta
- Order: Lepidoptera
- Superfamily: Noctuoidea
- Family: Erebidae
- Subfamily: Arctiinae
- Tribe: Lithosiini
- Genus: Talara
- Species: T. megaspila

Binomial name
- Talara megaspila Walker, 1866

Species of moth

Talara megaspila is a moth in the subfamily Arctiinae. It is found in Tefé, Brazil.
