= Talara albipars =

Scientific classification
- Kingdom: Animalia
- Phylum: Arthropoda
- Class: Insecta
- Order: Lepidoptera
- Superfamily: Noctuoidea
- Family: Erebidae
- Subfamily: Arctiinae
- Tribe: Lithosiini
- Genus: Talara
- Species: T. albipars

Binomial name
- Talara albipars Hampson, 1914

Species of moth

Talara albipars is a moth in the subfamily Arctiinae. It was described by George Hampson in 1914. It is found in Ecuador.
