= Talara niveata =

Scientific classification
- Domain: Eukaryota
- Kingdom: Animalia
- Phylum: Arthropoda
- Class: Insecta
- Order: Lepidoptera
- Superfamily: Noctuoidea
- Family: Erebidae
- Subfamily: Arctiinae
- Tribe: Lithosiini
- Genus: Talara
- Species: T. niveata

Binomial name
- Talara niveata (Butler, 1878)

Synonyms
- Cisthene niveata Butler, 1878

Species of moth

Talara niveata is a moth in the subfamily Arctiinae. It was described by Arthur Gardiner Butler in 1878. It is found in Espírito Santo, Brazil.
