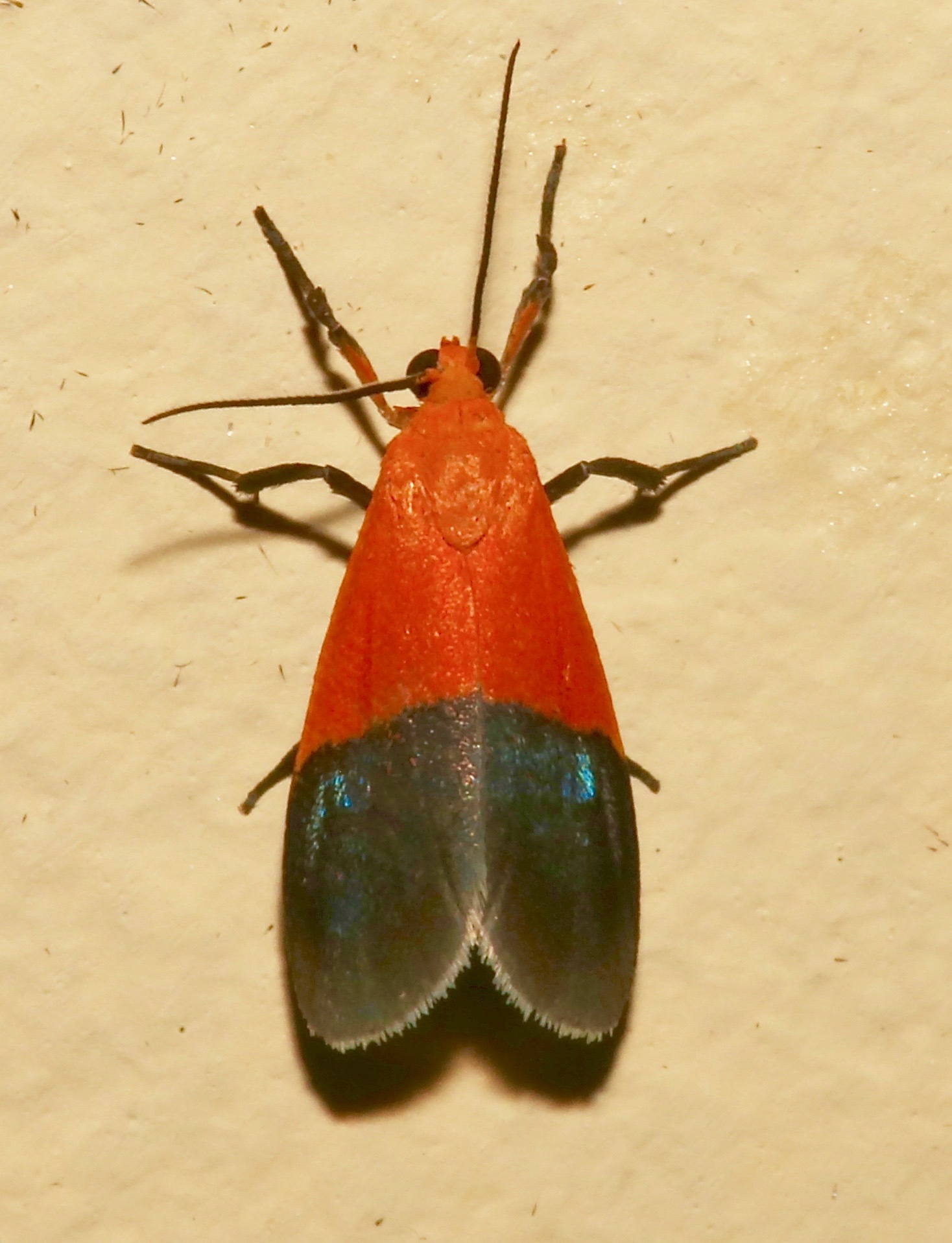
- Talara togata, Ecuador

Scientific classification
- Domain: Eukaryota
- Kingdom: Animalia
- Phylum: Arthropoda
- Class: Insecta
- Order: Lepidoptera
- Superfamily: Noctuoidea
- Family: Erebidae
- Subfamily: Arctiinae
- Tribe: Lithosiini
- Genus: Talara
- Species: T. togata

Binomial name
- Talara togata Draudt, 1918

= Talara togata =

Species of moth

Talara togata is a species in the moth family Erebidae, found in South America.
