= Talara thea =

Scientific classification
- Domain: Eukaryota
- Kingdom: Animalia
- Phylum: Arthropoda
- Class: Insecta
- Order: Lepidoptera
- Superfamily: Noctuoidea
- Family: Erebidae
- Subfamily: Arctiinae
- Tribe: Lithosiini
- Genus: Talara
- Species: T. thea

Binomial name
- Talara thea Schaus, 1924

Species of moth

Talara thea is a moth in the subfamily Arctiinae. It was described by William Schaus in 1924. It is found in Ecuador.
