= Talara rufibasis =

Scientific classification
- Kingdom: Animalia
- Phylum: Arthropoda
- Clade: Pancrustacea
- Class: Insecta
- Order: Lepidoptera
- Superfamily: Noctuoidea
- Family: Erebidae
- Subfamily: Arctiinae
- Tribe: Lithosiini
- Genus: Talara
- Species: T. rufibasis

Binomial name
- Talara rufibasis (Felder, 1875)

Synonyms
- Cisthene rufibasis Felder, 1875

Species of moth

Talara rufibasis is a moth in the subfamily Arctiinae. It was described by Felder in 1875. It is found in Panama and Colombia.
