= Talara phaeella =

Scientific classification
- Kingdom: Animalia
- Phylum: Arthropoda
- Class: Insecta
- Order: Lepidoptera
- Superfamily: Noctuoidea
- Family: Erebidae
- Subfamily: Arctiinae
- Tribe: Lithosiini
- Genus: Talara
- Species: T. phaeella

Binomial name
- Talara phaeella Hampson, 1900

Species of moth

Talara phaeella is a moth in the subfamily Arctiinae. It was described by George Hampson in 1900. It is found in Panama.
