= Talara grisea =

Scientific classification
- Domain: Eukaryota
- Kingdom: Animalia
- Phylum: Arthropoda
- Class: Insecta
- Order: Lepidoptera
- Superfamily: Noctuoidea
- Family: Erebidae
- Subfamily: Arctiinae
- Tribe: Lithosiini
- Genus: Talara
- Species: T. grisea

Binomial name
- Talara grisea Schaus, 1896

Species of moth

Talara grisea is a moth in the subfamily Arctiinae. It was described by William Schaus in 1896. It is found in São Paulo, Brazil.
