= Talara leucocera =

Scientific classification
- Domain: Eukaryota
- Kingdom: Animalia
- Phylum: Arthropoda
- Class: Insecta
- Order: Lepidoptera
- Superfamily: Noctuoidea
- Family: Erebidae
- Subfamily: Arctiinae
- Tribe: Lithosiini
- Genus: Talara
- Species: T. leucocera

Binomial name
- Talara leucocera H. Druce, 1899

Species of moth

Talara leucocera is a moth in the subfamily Arctiinae. It was described by Herbert Druce in 1899. It is found in Espírito Santo, Brazil.
