= Talara ditis =

Scientific classification
- Domain: Eukaryota
- Kingdom: Animalia
- Phylum: Arthropoda
- Class: Insecta
- Order: Lepidoptera
- Superfamily: Noctuoidea
- Family: Erebidae
- Subfamily: Arctiinae
- Tribe: Lithosiini
- Genus: Talara
- Species: T. ditis

Binomial name
- Talara ditis (Butler, 1878)

Synonyms
- Maepha ditis Butler, 1878

Species of moth

Talara ditis is a moth in the subfamily Arctiinae. It was described by Arthur Gardiner Butler in 1878. It is found in the Brazilian states of Espírito Santo and São Paulo.
