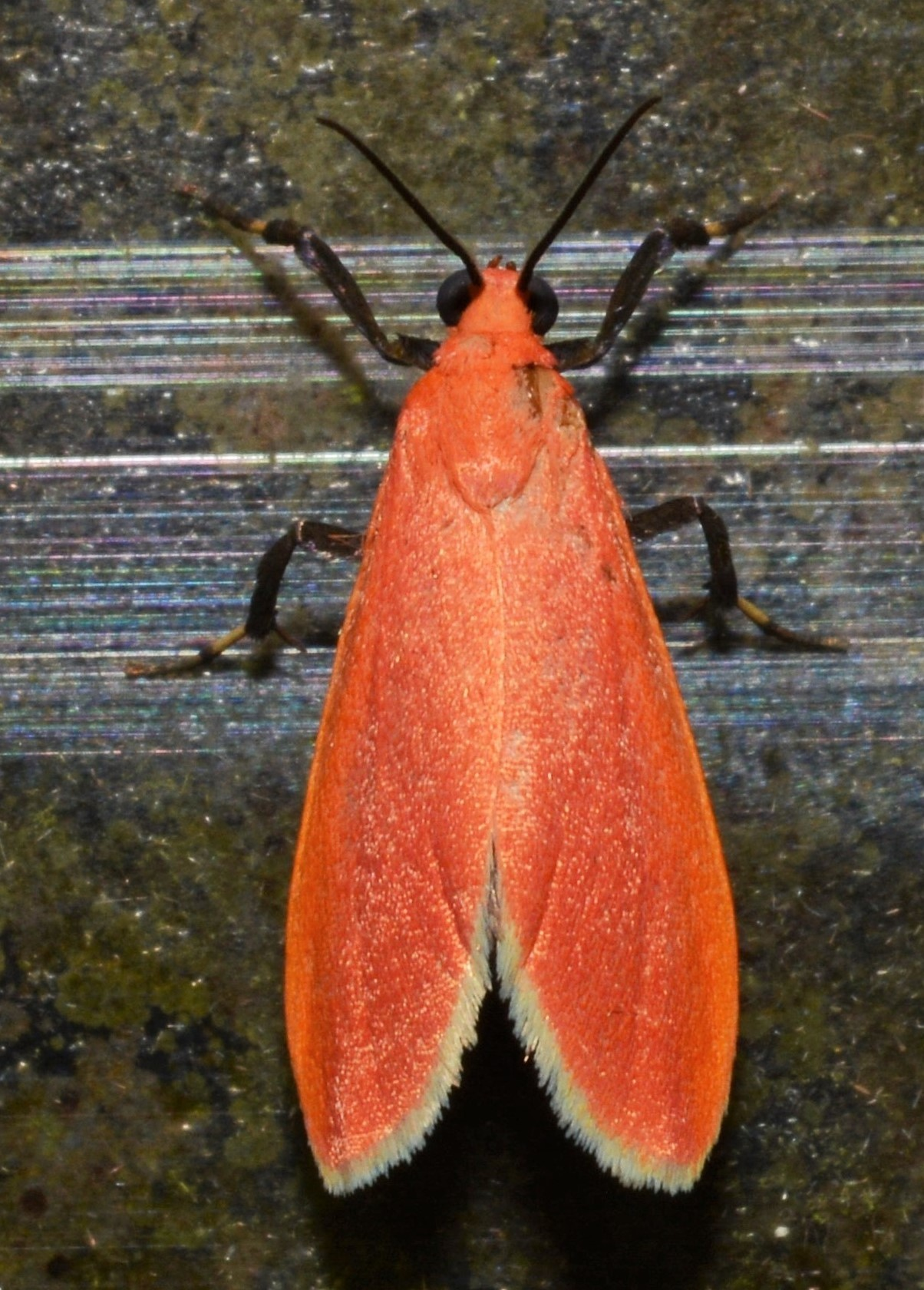
- Talara rubida, Costa Rica

Scientific classification
- Domain: Eukaryota
- Kingdom: Animalia
- Phylum: Arthropoda
- Class: Insecta
- Order: Lepidoptera
- Superfamily: Noctuoidea
- Family: Erebidae
- Subfamily: Arctiinae
- Genus: Talara
- Species: T. rubida

Binomial name
- Talara rubida Schaus, 1911

= Talara rubida =

Species of moth

Talara rubida is a species in the moth family Erebidae, found in Central America.
