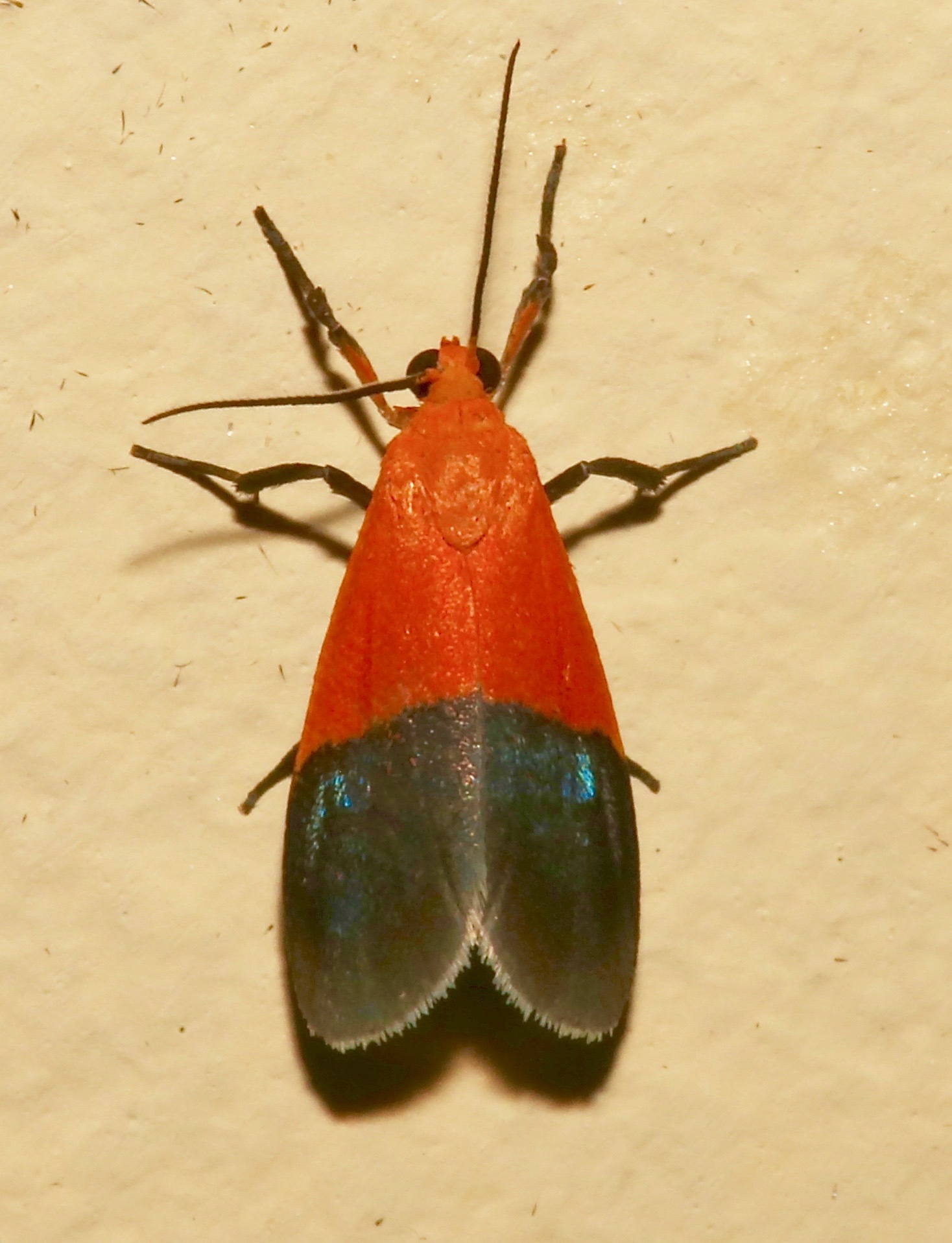
- Talara togata, Ecuador

Scientific classification
- Kingdom: Animalia
- Phylum: Arthropoda
- Class: Insecta
- Order: Lepidoptera
- Superfamily: Noctuoidea
- Family: Erebidae
- Subfamily: Arctiinae
- Tribe: Lithosiini
- Genus: Talara; Walker, 1866

= Talara (moth) =

Genus of moths

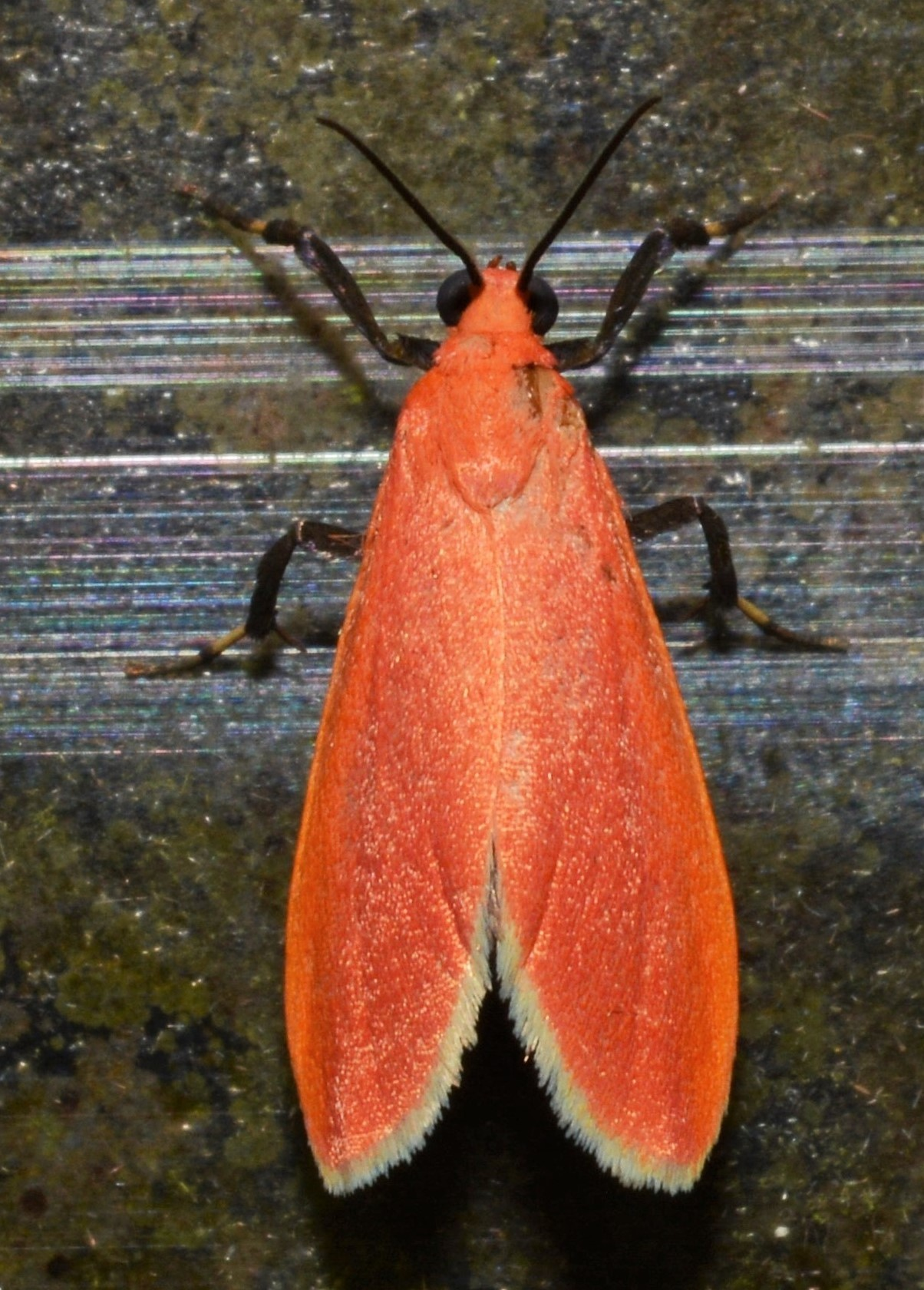
Talara rubida, Costa Rica

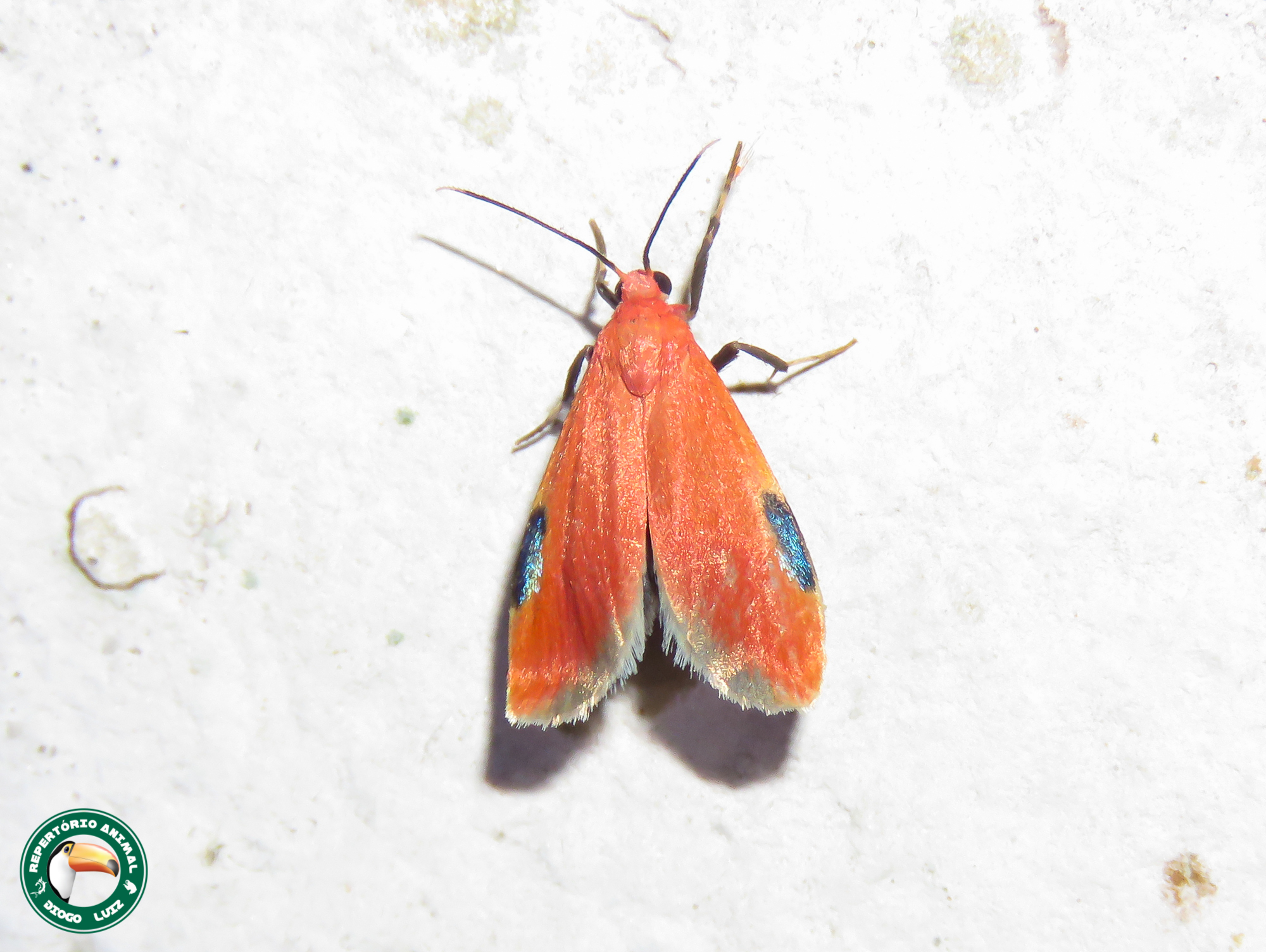
Talara coccinea, Brasil

Talara is a genus of lichen moths in the family Erebidae. There are more than 40 described species in Talara, found in Central and South America.

== Species ==
These 49 species belong to the genus Talara:

- Talara albipars Hampson, 1914
- Talara alborosea Rothschild, 1913
- Talara barema Schaus, 1896
- Talara bicolor Rothschild, 1913
- Talara bombycia Schaus, 1896
- Talara brunnescens Rothschild, 1913
- Talara cara Schaus, 1911
- Talara chionophaea Hampson, 1914
- Talara cinerea Hampson, 1900
- Talara coccinea Butler, 1877
- Talara decepta Schaus, 1905
- Talara dilutior Rothschild, 1913
- Talara ditis Butler, 1878
- Talara diversa Schaus, 1905
- Talara grisea Schaus, 1896
- Talara guyanae Gibeaux, 1983
- Talara hoffmanni Reich, 1933
- Talara ignibasis Rothschild, 1913
- Talara lepida Schaus, 1911
- Talara leucocera Druce, 1899
- Talara leucophaea Dognin, 1912
- Talara megaspila Walker, 1866
- Talara melanosticta Dyar, 1914
- Talara mesospila Dyar, 1914
- Talara miniata Rothschild, 1913
- Talara minynthadia Dyar, 1914
- Talara mona Dyar, 1914
- Talara muricolor Gibeaux, 1983
- Talara nigrivertex Gibeaux, 1983
- Talara nigroplagiata Rothschild, 1913
- Talara niveata Butler, 1878
- Talara ornata Schaus, 1905
- Talara phaeella Hampson, 1900
- Talara proxima Gibeaux, 1983
- Talara rubida Schaus, 1911
- Talara rufa Schaus, 1899
- Talara rufibasis Felder, 1875
- Talara rugipennis Schaus, 1905
- Talara semiflava Draudt, 1918
- Talara simulatrix Gibeaux, 1983
- Talara subcoccinea Schaus, 1905
- Talara synnephala Dyar, 1916
- Talara thea Schaus
- Talara thiaucourti Gibeaux, 1983
- Talara togata Draudt, 1918
- Talara tristis Gibeaux, 1983
- Talara unimoda Schaus, 1905
- Talara violaceogriseus Rothschild, 1913
- Talara violescens Dyar, 1914
