= Pronola diffusa =

Scientific classification
- Domain: Eukaryota
- Kingdom: Animalia
- Phylum: Arthropoda
- Class: Insecta
- Order: Lepidoptera
- Superfamily: Noctuoidea
- Family: Erebidae
- Subfamily: Arctiinae
- Genus: Pronola
- Species: P. diffusa

Binomial name
- Pronola diffusa Schaus, 1899

Species of moth

Pronola diffusa is a moth in the subfamily Arctiinae. It was described by William Schaus in 1899. It is found in Peru.
