= Pronola perdiffusa =

Scientific classification
- Domain: Eukaryota
- Kingdom: Animalia
- Phylum: Arthropoda
- Class: Insecta
- Order: Lepidoptera
- Superfamily: Noctuoidea
- Family: Erebidae
- Subfamily: Arctiinae
- Genus: Pronola
- Species: P. perdiffusa

Binomial name
- Pronola perdiffusa Dognin, 1912

Species of moth

Pronola perdiffusa is a moth in the subfamily Arctiinae. It was described by Paul Dognin in 1912. It is found in Colombia.
