= Pronola fraterna =

Scientific classification
- Domain: Eukaryota
- Kingdom: Animalia
- Phylum: Arthropoda
- Class: Insecta
- Order: Lepidoptera
- Superfamily: Noctuoidea
- Family: Erebidae
- Subfamily: Arctiinae
- Genus: Pronola
- Species: P. fraterna

Binomial name
- Pronola fraterna Schaus, 1905

Species of moth

Pronola fraterna is a moth in the subfamily Arctiinae. It was described by William Schaus in 1905. It is found in French Guiana.
