= Pronola =

Scientific classification
- Kingdom: Animalia
- Phylum: Arthropoda
- Clade: Pancrustacea
- Class: Insecta
- Order: Lepidoptera
- Superfamily: Noctuoidea
- Family: Erebidae
- Subfamily: Arctiinae
- Genus: Pronola; Schaus, 1899

Genus of moths

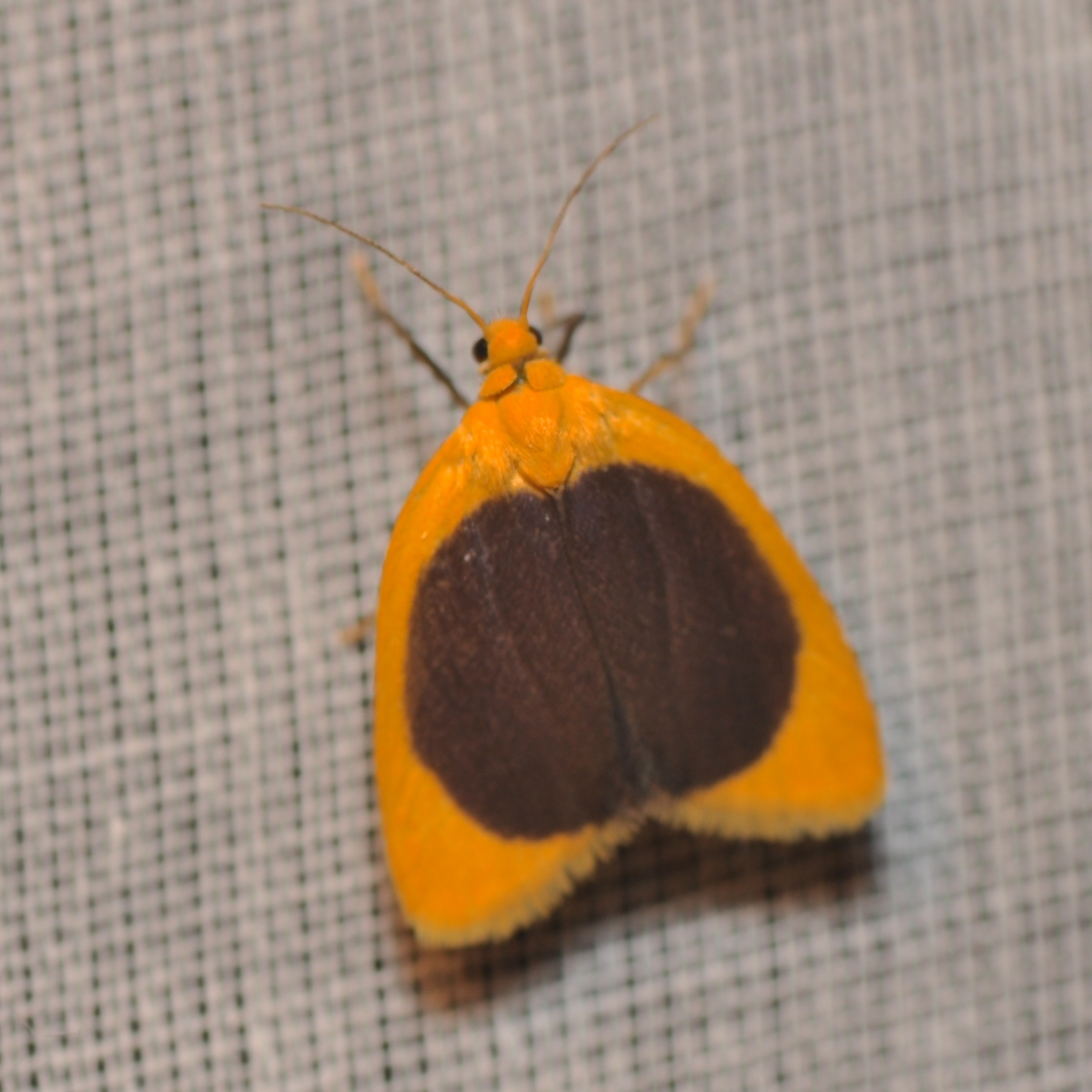
Pronola magniplaga (Schaus, 1899)

Pronola is a genus of moths in the family Arctiidae.

== Species ==
- Pronola diffusa Schaus, 1899
- Pronola ectrocta Dognin, 1912
- Pronola fraterna Schaus, 1905
- Pronola magniplaga Schaus, 1899
- Pronola perdiffusa Dognin, 1912
