= Macroptila fuscilaniata =

Scientific classification
- Kingdom: Animalia
- Phylum: Arthropoda
- Class: Insecta
- Order: Lepidoptera
- Superfamily: Noctuoidea
- Family: Erebidae
- Subfamily: Arctiinae
- Genus: Macroptila
- Species: M. fuscilaniata

Binomial name
- Macroptila fuscilaniata Hampson, 1914

Species of moth

Macroptila fuscilaniata is a moth of the subfamily Arctiinae. It was described by George Hampson in 1914. It is found in Colombia.
