= Macroptila elongata =

Scientific classification
- Domain: Eukaryota
- Kingdom: Animalia
- Phylum: Arthropoda
- Class: Insecta
- Order: Lepidoptera
- Superfamily: Noctuoidea
- Family: Erebidae
- Subfamily: Arctiinae
- Genus: Macroptila
- Species: M. elongata

Binomial name
- Macroptila elongata Reich, 1936

Species of moth

Macroptila elongata is a moth of the subfamily Arctiinae. It was described by Reich in 1936. It is found in Brazil.
