= Macroptila antonia =

Scientific classification
- Domain: Eukaryota
- Kingdom: Animalia
- Phylum: Arthropoda
- Class: Insecta
- Order: Lepidoptera
- Superfamily: Noctuoidea
- Family: Erebidae
- Subfamily: Arctiinae
- Genus: Macroptila
- Species: M. antonia

Binomial name
- Macroptila antonia Dognin, 1911

Species of moth

Macroptila antonia is a moth of the subfamily Arctiinae. It was described by Paul Dognin in 1911. It is found in Colombia.
