= Macroptila laniata =

Scientific classification
- Domain: Eukaryota
- Kingdom: Animalia
- Phylum: Arthropoda
- Class: Insecta
- Order: Lepidoptera
- Superfamily: Noctuoidea
- Family: Erebidae
- Subfamily: Arctiinae
- Genus: Macroptila
- Species: M. laniata

Binomial name
- Macroptila laniata Dognin, 1899

Species of moth

Macroptila laniata is a moth of the subfamily Arctiinae. It was described by Paul Dognin in 1899. It is found in Ecuador.
