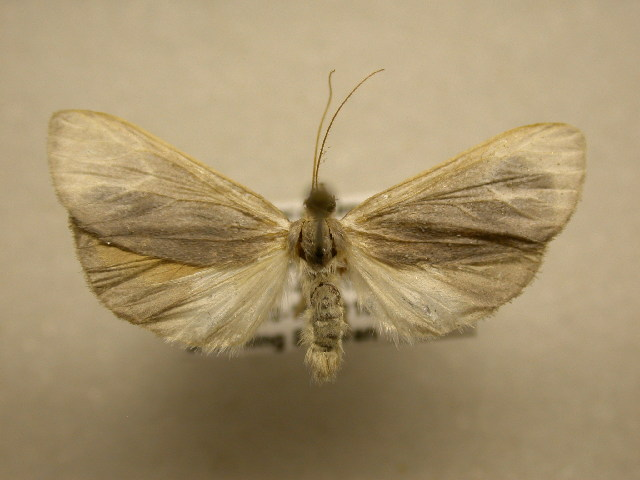
- Macroptila monstralis

Scientific classification
- Domain: Eukaryota
- Kingdom: Animalia
- Phylum: Arthropoda
- Class: Insecta
- Order: Lepidoptera
- Superfamily: Noctuoidea
- Family: Erebidae
- Subfamily: Arctiinae
- Tribe: Lithosiini
- Genus: Macroptila; Dognin, 1894

= Macroptila =

Genus of moths

Macroptila is a genus of moths in the subfamily Arctiinae. The genus was erected by Paul Dognin in 1894.

== Species ==
- Macroptila antonia Dognin, 1911
- Macroptila crinada Dognin, 1894
- Macroptila elongata Reich, 1936
- Macroptila extensa Rothschild, 1912
- Macroptila fuscilaniata Hampson, 1914
- Macroptila laniata Dognin, 1899
- Macroptila monstralis Schaus, 1911
- Macroptila nebecula Schaus, 1911
- Macroptila rotundata Dognin, 1916
