= Macroptila extensa =

Scientific classification
- Domain: Eukaryota
- Kingdom: Animalia
- Phylum: Arthropoda
- Class: Insecta
- Order: Lepidoptera
- Superfamily: Noctuoidea
- Family: Erebidae
- Subfamily: Arctiinae
- Genus: Macroptila
- Species: M. extensa

Binomial name
- Macroptila extensa (Rothschild, 1912)

Synonyms
- Agylla extensa Rothschild, 1912

Species of moth

Macroptila extensa is a moth of the subfamily Arctiinae. It was described by Rothschild in 1912. It is found in Peru.
