= Lamprostola thermeola =

Scientific classification
- Domain: Eukaryota
- Kingdom: Animalia
- Phylum: Arthropoda
- Class: Insecta
- Order: Lepidoptera
- Superfamily: Noctuoidea
- Family: Erebidae
- Subfamily: Arctiinae
- Genus: Lamprostola
- Species: L. thermeola

Binomial name
- Lamprostola thermeola Dognin, 1912

Species of moth

Lamprostola thermeola is a moth of the subfamily Arctiinae. It was described by Paul Dognin in 1912. There are no photos of it available currently to show how this species of moth looks like. It is found in Colombia.
