= Lamprostola molybdipera =

Scientific classification
- Domain: Eukaryota
- Kingdom: Animalia
- Phylum: Arthropoda
- Class: Insecta
- Order: Lepidoptera
- Superfamily: Noctuoidea
- Family: Erebidae
- Subfamily: Arctiinae
- Genus: Lamprostola
- Species: L. molybdipera

Binomial name
- Lamprostola molybdipera Schaus, 1899

Species of moth

Lamprostola molybdipera is a moth of the subfamily Arctiinae. It was described by William Schaus in 1899. It is found in Mexico. Its thorax, primaries, and head are all dark greenish black with a hint of iridescence; the veins are still darker. The secondaries and abdomen are dull brownish black.
