= Lamprostola aglaope =

Scientific classification
- Domain: Eukaryota
- Kingdom: Animalia
- Phylum: Arthropoda
- Class: Insecta
- Order: Lepidoptera
- Superfamily: Noctuoidea
- Family: Erebidae
- Subfamily: Arctiinae
- Genus: Lamprostola
- Species: L. aglaope

Binomial name
- Lamprostola aglaope (Felder, 1875)

Synonyms
- Cisthene aglaope Felder, 1875; Odozana hercyna Druce, 1885

Species of moth

Lamprostola aglaope is a moth of the subfamily Arctiinae. It was described by Felder in 1875. It is found in Mexico, Guatemala, Costa Rica and the Amazon region.
