= Lamprostola =

Scientific classification
- Domain: Eukaryota
- Kingdom: Animalia
- Phylum: Arthropoda
- Class: Insecta
- Order: Lepidoptera
- Superfamily: Noctuoidea
- Family: Erebidae
- Subfamily: Arctiinae
- Tribe: Lithosiini
- Genus: Lamprostola; Schaus, 1899

Genus of moths

Lamprostola is a genus of moths in the subfamily Arctiinae described by William Schaus in 1899.

== Species ==
- Lamprostola aglaope Felder, 1875
- Lamprostola endochrysis Dognin, 1909
- Lamprostola nitens Hampson, 1900
- Lamprostola olivacea Schaus, 1896
- Lamprostola molybdipera Schaus, 1899
- Lamprostola pascuala Schaus, 1896
- Lamprostola thermeola Dognin, 1912
- Lamprostola unifasciella Strand, 1922
