= Lamprostola unifasciella =

Scientific classification
- Kingdom: Animalia
- Phylum: Arthropoda
- Clade: Pancrustacea
- Class: Insecta
- Order: Lepidoptera
- Superfamily: Noctuoidea
- Family: Erebidae
- Subfamily: Arctiinae
- Genus: Lamprostola
- Species: L. unifasciella

Binomial name
- Lamprostola unifasciella Strand, 1922

Synonyms
- Illice unifascia Rothschild, 1913 (preocc.)

Species of moth

Lamprostola unifasciella is a species of moth in the subfamily Arctiinae. It was first described by Embrik Strand in 1922. It is found in Colombia.
