= Lamprostola olivacea =

Scientific classification
- Domain: Eukaryota
- Kingdom: Animalia
- Phylum: Arthropoda
- Class: Insecta
- Order: Lepidoptera
- Superfamily: Noctuoidea
- Family: Erebidae
- Subfamily: Arctiinae
- Genus: Lamprostola
- Species: L. olivacea

Binomial name
- Lamprostola olivacea (Schaus, 1896)

Synonyms
- Odozana olivacea Schaus, 1896

Species of moth

Lamprostola olivacea is a moth of the subfamily Arctiinae. It was described by Schaus in 1896. It is found in São Paulo, Brazil.
