= Garudinodes bicolorana =

Scientific classification
- Domain: Eukaryota
- Kingdom: Animalia
- Phylum: Arthropoda
- Class: Insecta
- Order: Lepidoptera
- Superfamily: Noctuoidea
- Family: Erebidae
- Subfamily: Arctiinae
- Genus: Garudinodes
- Species: G. bicolorana

Binomial name
- Garudinodes bicolorana Bethune-Baker, 1908

Synonyms
- Garudinodes affinis Rothschild, 1912

Species of moth

Garudinodes bicolorana is a moth of the family Erebidae. It was described by George Thomas Bethune-Baker in 1908. It is found in Papua New Guinea.
