= Garudinodes albofasciata =

Scientific classification
- Domain: Eukaryota
- Kingdom: Animalia
- Phylum: Arthropoda
- Class: Insecta
- Order: Lepidoptera
- Superfamily: Noctuoidea
- Family: Erebidae
- Subfamily: Arctiinae
- Genus: Garudinodes
- Species: G. albofasciata

Binomial name
- Garudinodes albofasciata (Rothschild, 1912)

Synonyms
- Lambula albofasciata Rothschild, 1912

Species of moth

Garudinodes albofasciata is a moth of the family Erebidae. It was described by Rothschild in 1912. It is found in New Guinea.
