= Garudinodes =

Scientific classification
- Domain: Eukaryota
- Kingdom: Animalia
- Phylum: Arthropoda
- Class: Insecta
- Order: Lepidoptera
- Superfamily: Noctuoidea
- Family: Erebidae
- Subfamily: Arctiinae
- Tribe: Lithosiini
- Genus: Garudinodes; Bethune-Baker, 1908

Genus of moths

Garudinodes is a genus of moths in the family Erebidae. The genus was erected by George Thomas Bethune-Baker in 1908.

== Species ==
- Garudinodes albiceps Rothschild, 1912
- Garudinodes albofasciata Rothschild, 1912
- Garudinodes bicolorana Bethune-Baker, 1908
- Garudinodes castaneus Rothschild, 1912
- Garudinodes trizona Hampson, 1911
