= Garudinodes trizona =

Scientific classification
- Kingdom: Animalia
- Phylum: Arthropoda
- Class: Insecta
- Order: Lepidoptera
- Superfamily: Noctuoidea
- Family: Erebidae
- Subfamily: Arctiinae
- Genus: Garudinodes
- Species: G. trizona

Binomial name
- Garudinodes trizona Hampson, 1911

Species of moth

Garudinodes trizona is a moth of the family Erebidae. It was described by George Hampson in 1911. It is found in Papua New Guinea.
