= Chrysochlorosia magnifica =

Scientific classification
- Domain: Eukaryota
- Kingdom: Animalia
- Phylum: Arthropoda
- Class: Insecta
- Order: Lepidoptera
- Superfamily: Noctuoidea
- Family: Erebidae
- Subfamily: Arctiinae
- Genus: Chrysochlorosia
- Species: C. magnifica

Binomial name
- Chrysochlorosia magnifica Schaus, 1911

Species of moth

Chrysochlorosia magnifica is a moth of the subfamily Arctiinae. It is found in Costa Rica.
