= Chrysochlorosia splendida =

Scientific classification
- Domain: Eukaryota
- Kingdom: Animalia
- Phylum: Arthropoda
- Class: Insecta
- Order: Lepidoptera
- Superfamily: Noctuoidea
- Family: Erebidae
- Subfamily: Arctiinae
- Genus: Chrysochlorosia
- Species: C. splendida

Binomial name
- Chrysochlorosia splendida (H. Druce, 1885)

Synonyms
- Ptychoglene splendida H. Druce, 1885

Species of moth

Chrysochlorosia splendida is a moth of the subfamily Arctiinae first described by Herbert Druce in 1885. It is found in Ecuador and Bolivia.
