= Chrysochlorosia callistia =

Scientific classification
- Kingdom: Animalia
- Phylum: Arthropoda
- Class: Insecta
- Order: Lepidoptera
- Superfamily: Noctuoidea
- Family: Erebidae
- Subfamily: Arctiinae
- Genus: Chrysochlorosia
- Species: C. callistia

Binomial name
- Chrysochlorosia callistia Hampson, 1900

Species of moth

Chrysochlorosia callistia is a moth of the subfamily Arctiinae first described by George Hampson in 1900. It is found in Bolivia.
