= Anaene =

Scientific classification
- Kingdom: Animalia
- Phylum: Arthropoda
- Class: Insecta
- Order: Lepidoptera
- Superfamily: Noctuoidea
- Family: Erebidae
- Subfamily: Arctiinae
- Tribe: Lithosiini
- Genus: Anaene; Dyar, 1914

Genus of moths

Anaene is a genus of moths in the subfamily Arctiinae. The genus was erected by Harrison Gray Dyar Jr. in 1914.

== Species ==
- Anaene diagramma Dyar, 1914
- Anaene improspersa Dyar, 1914
- Anaene spurca Dyar, 1914
- Anaene squalida Dyar, 1914
