= Anaene diagramma =

Scientific classification
- Kingdom: Animalia
- Phylum: Arthropoda
- Class: Insecta
- Order: Lepidoptera
- Superfamily: Noctuoidea
- Family: Erebidae
- Subfamily: Arctiinae
- Genus: Anaene
- Species: A. diagramma

Binomial name
- Anaene diagramma Dyar, 1914

Species of moth

Anaene diagramma is a moth of the subfamily Arctiinae. It was described by Harrison Gray Dyar Jr. in 1914. It is found in Panama.
