= Vianania australis =

Scientific classification
- Domain: Eukaryota
- Kingdom: Animalia
- Phylum: Arthropoda
- Class: Insecta
- Order: Lepidoptera
- Superfamily: Noctuoidea
- Family: Erebidae
- Subfamily: Arctiinae
- Genus: Vianania
- Species: V. australis

Binomial name
- Vianania australis (Orfila, 1935)

Synonyms
- Cisthene australis Orfila, 1935

Species of moth

Vianania australis is a moth in the subfamily Arctiinae. It was described by Orfila in 1935. It is found in Argentina.
