= Vianania argentinensis =

Scientific classification
- Domain: Eukaryota
- Kingdom: Animalia
- Phylum: Arthropoda
- Class: Insecta
- Order: Lepidoptera
- Superfamily: Noctuoidea
- Family: Erebidae
- Subfamily: Arctiinae
- Genus: Vianania
- Species: V. argentinensis

Binomial name
- Vianania argentinensis (Rothschild, 1912)

Synonyms
- Cisthene argentinensis Rothschild, 1912; Eucyclopera argentinensis; Eucyclopera argentinensis ab. dimidionigra Strand, 1922

Species of moth

Vianania argentinensis is a moth of the family Erebidae first described by Rothschild in 1912. It is found in Argentina.
