= Vianania aymara =

Scientific classification
- Domain: Eukaryota
- Kingdom: Animalia
- Phylum: Arthropoda
- Class: Insecta
- Order: Lepidoptera
- Superfamily: Noctuoidea
- Family: Erebidae
- Subfamily: Arctiinae
- Genus: Vianania
- Species: V. aymara

Binomial name
- Vianania aymara Orfila, 1954

Species of moth

Vianania aymara is a moth in the subfamily Arctiinae. It was described by Orfila in 1954. It is found in Bolivia.
