= Vianania =

Scientific classification
- Domain: Eukaryota
- Kingdom: Animalia
- Phylum: Arthropoda
- Class: Insecta
- Order: Lepidoptera
- Superfamily: Noctuoidea
- Family: Erebidae
- Subfamily: Arctiinae
- Tribe: Lithosiini
- Genus: Vianania; Orfila, 1954

Genus of moths

Vianania is a genus of moths in the subfamily Arctiinae. The genus was erected by Ricardo N. Orfila in 1954.

== Species ==
- Vianania argentinensis (Rothschild, 1912)
- Vianania australis Orfila, 1935
- Vianania aymara Orfila, 1954
