= Pachycerosia lutulenta =

Scientific classification
- Domain: Eukaryota
- Kingdom: Animalia
- Phylum: Arthropoda
- Class: Insecta
- Order: Lepidoptera
- Superfamily: Noctuoidea
- Family: Erebidae
- Subfamily: Arctiinae
- Genus: Pachycerosia
- Species: P. lutulenta

Binomial name
- Pachycerosia lutulenta Wileman & West, 1928

Species of moth

Pachycerosia lutulenta is a moth of the subfamily Arctiinae. It was described by Wileman and West in 1928. It is found in the Philippines.
