= Pachycerosia bipunctulata =

Scientific classification
- Domain: Eukaryota
- Kingdom: Animalia
- Phylum: Arthropoda
- Class: Insecta
- Order: Lepidoptera
- Superfamily: Noctuoidea
- Family: Erebidae
- Subfamily: Arctiinae
- Genus: Pachycerosia
- Species: P. bipunctulata

Binomial name
- Pachycerosia bipunctulata van Eecke, 1927

Species of moth

Pachycerosia bipunctulata is a moth of the subfamily Arctiinae. It was described by van Eecke in 1927. It is found on Sumatra.
