= Pachycerosia bipuncta =

Scientific classification
- Kingdom: Animalia
- Phylum: Arthropoda
- Clade: Pancrustacea
- Class: Insecta
- Order: Lepidoptera
- Superfamily: Noctuoidea
- Family: Erebidae
- Subfamily: Arctiinae
- Genus: Pachycerosia
- Species: P. bipuncta

Binomial name
- Pachycerosia bipuncta Hampson, 1900

Species of moth

Pachycerosia bipuncta is a moth of the subfamily Arctiinae. It was described by George Hampson in 1900. It is found on the Andaman Islands.
