= Paragylla amoureli =

Scientific classification
- Domain: Eukaryota
- Kingdom: Animalia
- Phylum: Arthropoda
- Class: Insecta
- Order: Lepidoptera
- Superfamily: Noctuoidea
- Family: Erebidae
- Subfamily: Arctiinae
- Genus: Paragylla
- Species: P. amoureli

Binomial name
- Paragylla amoureli (Dognin, 1890)

Synonyms
- Areva amoureli Dognin, 1890

Species of moth

Paragylla amoureli is a moth of the subfamily Arctiinae. It was described by Paul Dognin in 1890. It is found in Ecuador.
