= Paragylla albovenosa =

Scientific classification
- Domain: Eukaryota
- Kingdom: Animalia
- Phylum: Arthropoda
- Class: Insecta
- Order: Lepidoptera
- Superfamily: Noctuoidea
- Family: Erebidae
- Subfamily: Arctiinae
- Genus: Paragylla
- Species: P. albovenosa

Binomial name
- Paragylla albovenosa Tessmann, 1928

Species of moth

Paragylla albovenosa is a moth of the subfamily Arctiinae. It was described by Tessmann in 1928. It is found in Peru.
