= Paragylla =

Scientific classification
- Domain: Eukaryota
- Kingdom: Animalia
- Phylum: Arthropoda
- Class: Insecta
- Order: Lepidoptera
- Superfamily: Noctuoidea
- Family: Erebidae
- Subfamily: Arctiinae
- Tribe: Lithosiini
- Genus: Paragylla; Dognin, 1899

Genus of moths

Paragylla is a genus of moths in the subfamily Arctiinae. The genus was erected by Paul Dognin in 1899.

== Species ==
- Paragylla albovenosa Tessmann, 1928
- Paragylla amoureli Dognin, 1890
- Paragylla endophaea Dognin, 1899
