= Eurylomia ochreata =

Scientific classification
- Domain: Eukaryota
- Kingdom: Animalia
- Phylum: Arthropoda
- Class: Insecta
- Order: Lepidoptera
- Superfamily: Noctuoidea
- Family: Erebidae
- Subfamily: Arctiinae
- Genus: Eurylomia
- Species: E. ochreata

Binomial name
- Eurylomia ochreata H. Druce, 1885

Species of moth

Eurylomia ochreata is a moth of the subfamily Arctiinae first described by Herbert Druce in 1885. It is found in Honduras.
