= Eurylomia =

Scientific classification
- Domain: Eukaryota
- Kingdom: Animalia
- Phylum: Arthropoda
- Class: Insecta
- Order: Lepidoptera
- Superfamily: Noctuoidea
- Family: Erebidae
- Subfamily: Arctiinae
- Tribe: Lithosiini
- Genus: Eurylomia; Felder, 1874

Genus of moths

Eurylomia is a genus of moths in the subfamily Arctiinae. The genus was described by Felder in 1874.

== Species ==
- Eurylomia cordula
- Eurylomia ochreata
- Eurylomia similliforma
