= Eurylomia similliforma =

Scientific classification
- Domain: Eukaryota
- Kingdom: Animalia
- Phylum: Arthropoda
- Class: Insecta
- Order: Lepidoptera
- Superfamily: Noctuoidea
- Family: Erebidae
- Subfamily: Arctiinae
- Genus: Eurylomia
- Species: E. similliforma

Binomial name
- Eurylomia similliforma Rothschild, 1913

Species of moth

Eurylomia similliforma is a moth of the subfamily Arctiinae. It is found in Guatemala.
