= Eurylomia cordula =

Scientific classification
- Domain: Eukaryota
- Kingdom: Animalia
- Phylum: Arthropoda
- Class: Insecta
- Order: Lepidoptera
- Superfamily: Noctuoidea
- Family: Erebidae
- Subfamily: Arctiinae
- Genus: Eurylomia
- Species: E. cordula

Binomial name
- Eurylomia cordula (Boisduval, 1870)

Synonyms
- Lithosia cordula Boisduval, 1870; Eurylomia curvinervis Felder, 1874

Species of moth

Eurylomia cordula is a moth of the subfamily Arctiinae first described by Jean Baptiste Boisduval in 1870. It is found in Mexico and Honduras.
