= Barsinella asuroides =

Scientific classification
- Kingdom: Animalia
- Phylum: Arthropoda
- Clade: Pancrustacea
- Class: Insecta
- Order: Lepidoptera
- Superfamily: Noctuoidea
- Family: Erebidae
- Subfamily: Arctiinae
- Genus: Barsinella
- Species: B. asuroides

Binomial name
- Barsinella asuroides Gibeaux, 1983

Species of moth

Barsinella asuroides is a moth of the subfamily Arctiinae. It is found in French Guiana.
