= Barsinella desetta =

Scientific classification
- Kingdom: Animalia
- Phylum: Arthropoda
- Class: Insecta
- Order: Lepidoptera
- Superfamily: Noctuoidea
- Family: Erebidae
- Subfamily: Arctiinae
- Genus: Barsinella
- Species: B. desetta

Binomial name
- Barsinella desetta Dyar, 1914

Species of moth

Barsinella desetta is a moth of the subfamily Arctiinae first described by Harrison Gray Dyar Jr. in 1914. It is found in Panama.
