= Barsinella mirabilis =

Scientific classification
- Domain: Eukaryota
- Kingdom: Animalia
- Phylum: Arthropoda
- Class: Insecta
- Order: Lepidoptera
- Superfamily: Noctuoidea
- Family: Erebidae
- Subfamily: Arctiinae
- Genus: Barsinella
- Species: B. mirabilis

Binomial name
- Barsinella mirabilis Butler, 1878

Synonyms
- Barsinella expandens Rothschild, 1913

Species of moth

Barsinella mirabilis is a moth of the subfamily Arctiinae first described by Arthur Gardiner Butler in 1878. It is found in Espírito Santo, Brazil.
