= Barsinella =

Scientific classification
- Domain: Eukaryota
- Kingdom: Animalia
- Phylum: Arthropoda
- Class: Insecta
- Order: Lepidoptera
- Superfamily: Noctuoidea
- Family: Erebidae
- Subfamily: Arctiinae
- Tribe: Lithosiini
- Genus: Barsinella; Butler, 1878

Genus of moths

Barsinella is a genus of moths in the subfamily Arctiinae. The genus was erected by Arthur Gardiner Butler in 1878.

== Species ==
- Barsinella asuroides
- Barsinella desetta
- Barsinella mirabilis
