= Eutelesia vulgaris =

Scientific classification
- Domain: Eukaryota
- Kingdom: Animalia
- Phylum: Arthropoda
- Class: Insecta
- Order: Lepidoptera
- Superfamily: Noctuoidea
- Family: Erebidae
- Subfamily: Arctiinae
- Genus: Eutelesia
- Species: E. vulgaris

Binomial name
- Eutelesia vulgaris (H. Druce, 1885)

Synonyms
- Nola vulgaris Druce, 1885

Species of moth

Eutelesia vulgaris is a moth of the subfamily Arctiinae first described by Herbert Druce in 1885. It is found in Costa Rica.
