= Eutelesia variegata =

Scientific classification
- Domain: Eukaryota
- Kingdom: Animalia
- Phylum: Arthropoda
- Class: Insecta
- Order: Lepidoptera
- Superfamily: Noctuoidea
- Family: Erebidae
- Subfamily: Arctiinae
- Genus: Eutelesia
- Species: E. variegata

Binomial name
- Eutelesia variegata Reich, 1936

Species of moth

Eutelesia variegata is a moth of the subfamily Arctiinae. It is found in Brazil.
