= Eutelesia phaeochroa =

Scientific classification
- Kingdom: Animalia
- Phylum: Arthropoda
- Class: Insecta
- Order: Lepidoptera
- Superfamily: Noctuoidea
- Family: Erebidae
- Subfamily: Arctiinae
- Genus: Eutelesia
- Species: E. phaeochroa

Binomial name
- Eutelesia phaeochroa Hampson, 1914

Species of moth

Eutelesia phaeochroa is a moth of the subfamily Arctiinae first described by George Hampson in 1914. It is found in Colombia.
