= Cloesia normalis =

Scientific classification
- Domain: Eukaryota
- Kingdom: Animalia
- Phylum: Arthropoda
- Class: Insecta
- Order: Lepidoptera
- Superfamily: Noctuoidea
- Family: Erebidae
- Subfamily: Arctiinae
- Genus: Cloesia
- Species: C. normalis

Binomial name
- Cloesia normalis Dognin, 1911

Species of moth

Cloesia normalis is a moth of the subfamily Arctiinae. It is found in Colombia.
