= Cloesia parthia =

Scientific classification
- Domain: Eukaryota
- Kingdom: Animalia
- Phylum: Arthropoda
- Class: Insecta
- Order: Lepidoptera
- Superfamily: Noctuoidea
- Family: Erebidae
- Subfamily: Arctiinae
- Genus: Cloesia
- Species: C. parthia

Binomial name
- Cloesia parthia (H. Druce, 1889)

Synonyms
- Ichoria parthia H. Druce, 1889

Species of moth

Cloesia parthia is a moth of the subfamily Arctiinae first described by Herbert Druce in 1889. It is found in Costa Rica, Nicaragua, Panama and the Brazilian state of São Paulo.
