= Hypermaepha =

Scientific classification
- Kingdom: Animalia
- Phylum: Arthropoda
- Class: Insecta
- Order: Lepidoptera
- Superfamily: Noctuoidea
- Family: Erebidae
- Subfamily: Arctiinae
- Tribe: Lithosiini
- Genus: Hypermaepha; Hampson, 1900

Genus of moths

Hypermaepha is a genus of moths in the subfamily Arctiinae. The genus was erected by George Hampson in 1900.

== Species ==
- Hypermaepha maroniensis Schaus, 1905
- Hypermaepha sanguinea Butler, 1878
