= Hypermaepha maroniensis =

Scientific classification
- Domain: Eukaryota
- Kingdom: Animalia
- Phylum: Arthropoda
- Class: Insecta
- Order: Lepidoptera
- Superfamily: Noctuoidea
- Family: Erebidae
- Subfamily: Arctiinae
- Genus: Hypermaepha
- Species: H. maroniensis

Binomial name
- Hypermaepha maroniensis Schaus, 1905

Synonyms
- Talara roseata Rothschild, 1913

Species of moth

Hypermaepha maroniensis is a moth of the subfamily Arctiinae. It was described by William Schaus in 1905. It is found in French Guiana and Peru.
