= Hypermaepha sanguinea =

Scientific classification
- Kingdom: Animalia
- Phylum: Arthropoda
- Clade: Pancrustacea
- Class: Insecta
- Order: Lepidoptera
- Superfamily: Noctuoidea
- Family: Erebidae
- Subfamily: Arctiinae
- Genus: Hypermaepha
- Species: H. sanguinea

Binomial name
- Hypermaepha sanguinea (Butler, 1878)

Synonyms
- Cisthene sanguinea Butler, 1878

Species of moth

Hypermaepha sanguinea is a moth of the subfamily Arctiinae. It was described by Arthur Gardiner Butler in 1878. It is found in the Amazon region.
