= Ascaptesyle =

Scientific classification
- Kingdom: Animalia
- Phylum: Arthropoda
- Class: Insecta
- Order: Lepidoptera
- Superfamily: Noctuoidea
- Family: Erebidae
- Subfamily: Arctiinae
- Tribe: Lithosiini
- Genus: Ascaptesyle; Dyar, 1905

Genus of moths

Ascaptesyle is a genus of moths in the subfamily Arctiinae.

== Species ==
- Ascaptesyle purpurascens Rothschild, 1913
- Ascaptesyle submarginata Schaus, 1905
