= Ascaptesyle purpurascens =

Scientific classification
- Domain: Eukaryota
- Kingdom: Animalia
- Phylum: Arthropoda
- Class: Insecta
- Order: Lepidoptera
- Superfamily: Noctuoidea
- Family: Erebidae
- Subfamily: Arctiinae
- Genus: Ascaptesyle
- Species: A. purpurascens

Binomial name
- Ascaptesyle purpurascens (Rothschild, 1913)

Synonyms
- Odozana purpurascens Rothschild, 1913

Species of moth

Ascaptesyle purpurascens is a moth of the subfamily Arctiinae. It was described by Rothschild in 1913. It is found in Peru.
