= Ascaptesyle submarginata =

Scientific classification
- Domain: Eukaryota
- Kingdom: Animalia
- Phylum: Arthropoda
- Class: Insecta
- Order: Lepidoptera
- Superfamily: Noctuoidea
- Family: Erebidae
- Subfamily: Arctiinae
- Genus: Ascaptesyle
- Species: A. submarginata

Binomial name
- Ascaptesyle submarginata Schaus, 1905

Species of moth

Ascaptesyle submarginata is a moth of the subfamily Arctiinae. It was described by William Schaus in 1905. It is found in Trinidad. No subspecies are listed in the Catalogue of Life.
