= Neothyone schistaceoplagiata =

Scientific classification
- Domain: Eukaryota
- Kingdom: Animalia
- Phylum: Arthropoda
- Class: Insecta
- Order: Lepidoptera
- Superfamily: Noctuoidea
- Family: Erebidae
- Subfamily: Arctiinae
- Genus: Neothyone
- Species: N. schistaceoplagiata

Binomial name
- Neothyone schistaceoplagiata (Rothschild, 1913)

Synonyms
- Talara schistaceoplagiata Rothschild, 1913

Species of moth

Neothyone schistaceoplagiata is a moth of the subfamily Arctiinae. It was described by Rothschild in 1913. It is found in Peru.
