= Neothyone xanthaema =

Scientific classification
- Domain: Eukaryota
- Kingdom: Animalia
- Phylum: Arthropoda
- Class: Insecta
- Order: Lepidoptera
- Superfamily: Noctuoidea
- Family: Erebidae
- Subfamily: Arctiinae
- Genus: Neothyone
- Species: N. xanthaema

Binomial name
- Neothyone xanthaema (Dognin, 1912)

Synonyms
- Thyone xanthaema Dognin, 1912

Species of moth

Neothyone xanthaema is a moth of the subfamily Arctiinae. It was described by Paul Dognin in 1912. It is found in French Guiana.
