= Neothyone =

Scientific classification
- Kingdom: Animalia
- Phylum: Arthropoda
- Class: Insecta
- Order: Lepidoptera
- Superfamily: Noctuoidea
- Family: Erebidae
- Subfamily: Arctiinae
- Tribe: Lithosiini
- Genus: Neothyone; Hampson, 1914

Genus of moths

Neothyone is a genus of moths in the subfamily Arctiinae.

== Species ==
- Neothyone schistaceoplagiata Rothschild, 1913
- Neothyone xanthaema Dognin, 1912
