= Chionosia apicalis =

Scientific classification
- Kingdom: Animalia
- Phylum: Arthropoda
- Clade: Pancrustacea
- Class: Insecta
- Order: Lepidoptera
- Superfamily: Noctuoidea
- Family: Erebidae
- Subfamily: Arctiinae
- Genus: Chionosia
- Species: C. apicalis

Binomial name
- Chionosia apicalis (Zeller, 1874)

Synonyms
- Calligenia apicalis Zeller, 1874; Chionosia trinitatis Draudt, 1918

Species of moth

Chionosia apicalis is a moth of the subfamily Arctiinae first described by Philipp Christoph Zeller in 1874. It is found in Brazil and Trinidad.
