= Chionosia zonata =

Scientific classification
- Kingdom: Animalia
- Phylum: Arthropoda
- Class: Insecta
- Order: Lepidoptera
- Superfamily: Noctuoidea
- Family: Erebidae
- Subfamily: Arctiinae
- Genus: Chionosia
- Species: C. zonata

Binomial name
- Chionosia zonata Hampson, 1900

Species of moth

Chionosia zonata is a fascinating moth belonging to the subfamily Arctiinae, first described by the renowned entomologist George Hampson in 1900. The species is native to the lush, biodiverse landscapes of Suriname, a country located on the northeastern coast of South America.
