= Dolichesia =

Scientific classification
- Domain: Eukaryota
- Kingdom: Animalia
- Phylum: Arthropoda
- Class: Insecta
- Order: Lepidoptera
- Superfamily: Noctuoidea
- Family: Erebidae
- Subfamily: Arctiinae
- Tribe: Lithosiini
- Genus: Dolichesia; Schaus, 1911

Synonyms
- Dolichesia Draudt, 1918

Genus of moths

Dolichesia is a genus of moths in the subfamily Arctiinae. The genus was erected by Schaus in 1911.

== Species ==
- Dolichesia falsimonia Schaus, 1911
- Dolichesia lignaria Rothschild, 1913
