= Dolichesia falsimonia =

Scientific classification
- Domain: Eukaryota
- Kingdom: Animalia
- Phylum: Arthropoda
- Class: Insecta
- Order: Lepidoptera
- Superfamily: Noctuoidea
- Family: Erebidae
- Subfamily: Arctiinae
- Genus: Dolichesia
- Species: D. falsimonia

Binomial name
- Dolichesia falsimonia Schaus, 1911

Species of moth

Dolichesia falsimonia is a moth of the subfamily Arctiinae. It was described by William Schaus in 1911. It is found in Costa Rica.
