= Mintopola dipartita =

Scientific classification
- Domain: Eukaryota
- Kingdom: Animalia
- Phylum: Arthropoda
- Class: Insecta
- Order: Lepidoptera
- Superfamily: Noctuoidea
- Family: Erebidae
- Subfamily: Arctiinae
- Genus: Mintopola
- Species: M. dipartita

Binomial name
- Mintopola dipartita Reich, 1936

Species of moth

Mintopola dipartita is a moth of the subfamily Arctiinae. It was described by Reich in 1936. It is found in Brazil.
