= Mintopola braziliensis =

Scientific classification
- Domain: Eukaryota
- Kingdom: Animalia
- Phylum: Arthropoda
- Class: Insecta
- Order: Lepidoptera
- Superfamily: Noctuoidea
- Family: Erebidae
- Subfamily: Arctiinae
- Genus: Mintopola
- Species: M. braziliensis

Binomial name
- Mintopola braziliensis Schaus, 1899

Synonyms
- Mintopola brasiliensis Hampson, 1900

Species of moth

Mintopola braziliensis is a moth of the subfamily Arctiinae. It was described by William Schaus in 1899. It is found in southern Brazil.
