= Mintopola =

Scientific classification
- Domain: Eukaryota
- Kingdom: Animalia
- Phylum: Arthropoda
- Class: Insecta
- Order: Lepidoptera
- Superfamily: Noctuoidea
- Family: Erebidae
- Subfamily: Arctiinae
- Tribe: Lithosiini
- Genus: Mintopola; Schaus, 1899

Genus of moths

Mintopola is a genus of moths in the subfamily Arctiinae. The genus was erected by William Schaus in 1899.

== Species ==
- Mintopola braziliensis Schaus, 1899
- Mintopola dipartita Reich, 1936
