= Marsypophora =

Scientific classification
- Domain: Eukaryota
- Kingdom: Animalia
- Phylum: Arthropoda
- Class: Insecta
- Order: Lepidoptera
- Superfamily: Noctuoidea
- Family: Erebidae
- Subfamily: Arctiinae
- Tribe: Lithosiini
- Genus: Marsypophora; Felder, 1874

Genus of moths

Marsypophora is a genus of moths in the subfamily Arctiinae.

== Species ==
- Marsypophora dissimilipennis Dognin, 1892
- Marsypophora erycinoides Felder, 1875
