= Marsypophora erycinoides =

Scientific classification
- Domain: Eukaryota
- Kingdom: Animalia
- Phylum: Arthropoda
- Class: Insecta
- Order: Lepidoptera
- Superfamily: Noctuoidea
- Family: Erebidae
- Subfamily: Arctiinae
- Genus: Marsypophora
- Species: M. erycinoides

Binomial name
- Marsypophora erycinoides Felder, 1875

Species of moth

Marsypophora erycinoides is a moth of the subfamily Arctiinae. It was described by Felder in 1875. It is found in Colombia.
