= Marsypophora dissimilipennis =

Scientific classification
- Domain: Eukaryota
- Kingdom: Animalia
- Phylum: Arthropoda
- Class: Insecta
- Order: Lepidoptera
- Superfamily: Noctuoidea
- Family: Erebidae
- Subfamily: Arctiinae
- Genus: Marsypophora
- Species: M. dissimilipennis

Binomial name
- Marsypophora dissimilipennis Dognin, 1892

Species of moth

Marsypophora dissimilipennis is a moth of the subfamily Arctiinae. It was described by Paul Dognin in 1892. It is found in Ecuador.
