= Epitalara commixta =

Scientific classification
- Domain: Eukaryota
- Kingdom: Animalia
- Phylum: Arthropoda
- Class: Insecta
- Order: Lepidoptera
- Superfamily: Noctuoidea
- Family: Erebidae
- Subfamily: Arctiinae
- Genus: Epitalara
- Species: E. commixta

Binomial name
- Epitalara commixta (Schaus, 1911)

Synonyms
- Paratalara commixta Schaus, 1911

Species of moth

Epitalara commixta is a moth of the subfamily Arctiinae. It was described by Schaus in 1911. It is found in Costa Rica.
