= Epitalara reversa =

Scientific classification
- Domain: Eukaryota
- Kingdom: Animalia
- Phylum: Arthropoda
- Class: Insecta
- Order: Lepidoptera
- Superfamily: Noctuoidea
- Family: Erebidae
- Subfamily: Arctiinae
- Genus: Epitalara
- Species: E. reversa

Binomial name
- Epitalara reversa Schaus, 1905

Species of moth

Epitalara reversa is a moth of the subfamily Arctiinae. It was described by William Schaus in 1905. It is found in French Guiana.
