= Epitalara =

Scientific classification
- Domain: Eukaryota
- Kingdom: Animalia
- Phylum: Arthropoda
- Class: Insecta
- Order: Lepidoptera
- Superfamily: Noctuoidea
- Family: Erebidae
- Subfamily: Arctiinae
- Tribe: Lithosiini
- Genus: Epitalara; Dyar, 1905

Genus of moths

Epitalara is a genus of moths in the subfamily Arctiinae.

== Species ==
- Epitalara commixta Schaus, 1911
- Epitalara reversa Schaus, 1905
