= Urozana cordatula =

Scientific classification
- Domain: Eukaryota
- Kingdom: Animalia
- Phylum: Arthropoda
- Class: Insecta
- Order: Lepidoptera
- Superfamily: Noctuoidea
- Family: Erebidae
- Subfamily: Arctiinae
- Genus: Urozana
- Species: U. cordatula

Binomial name
- Urozana cordatula (H. Druce, 1885)

Synonyms
- Odozana cordatula H. Druce, 1885

Species of moth

Urozana cordatula is a moth in the subfamily Arctiinae. It was described by Herbert Druce in 1885. It is found in Guatemala.
