= Urozana metaphaenica =

Scientific classification
- Domain: Eukaryota
- Kingdom: Animalia
- Phylum: Arthropoda
- Class: Insecta
- Order: Lepidoptera
- Superfamily: Noctuoidea
- Family: Erebidae
- Subfamily: Arctiinae
- Genus: Urozana
- Species: U. metaphaenica

Binomial name
- Urozana metaphaenica Dognin, 1916

Species of moth

Urozana metaphaenica is a moth in the subfamily Arctiinae. It was described by Paul Dognin in 1916. It is found in Brazil.
