= Urozana =

Scientific classification
- Kingdom: Animalia
- Phylum: Arthropoda
- Class: Insecta
- Order: Lepidoptera
- Superfamily: Noctuoidea
- Family: Erebidae
- Subfamily: Arctiinae
- Tribe: Lithosiini
- Genus: Urozana; Hampson, 1900

Genus of moths

Urozana is a genus of moths in the subfamily Arctiinae.

== Species ==
- Urozana cordatula Druce, 1885
- Urozana metaphaenica Dognin, 1916
