= Disoidemata osmophora =

Scientific classification
- Kingdom: Animalia
- Phylum: Arthropoda
- Class: Insecta
- Order: Lepidoptera
- Superfamily: Noctuoidea
- Family: Erebidae
- Subfamily: Arctiinae
- Genus: Disoidemata
- Species: D. osmophora

Binomial name
- Disoidemata osmophora Hampson, 1900

Species of moth

Disoidemata osmophora is a moth of the subfamily Arctiinae first described by George Hampson in 1900. It is found in Mexico.
