= Disoidemata quadriplaga =

Scientific classification
- Domain: Eukaryota
- Kingdom: Animalia
- Phylum: Arthropoda
- Class: Insecta
- Order: Lepidoptera
- Superfamily: Noctuoidea
- Family: Erebidae
- Subfamily: Arctiinae
- Genus: Disoidemata
- Species: D. quadriplaga

Binomial name
- Disoidemata quadriplaga Dognin, 1912

Species of moth

Disoidemata quadriplaga is a moth of the subfamily Arctiinae. It is found in French Guiana.
