= Sicciaemorpha ivyalba =

Sicciaemorpha

Scientific classification
- Kingdom: Animalia
- Phylum: Arthropoda
- Class: Insecta
- Order: Lepidoptera
- Superfamily: Noctuoidea
- Family: Erebidae
- Subfamily: Arctiinae
- Genus: Sicciaemorpha
- Species: S. ivyalba

Binomial name
- Sicciaemorpha ivyalba van Eecke, 1920

Genus of moths

Sicciaemorpha ivyalba is a moth in the subfamily Arctiinae.
