= Sicciaemorpha =

Scientific classification
- Kingdom: Animalia
- Phylum: Arthropoda
- Class: Insecta
- Order: Lepidoptera
- Superfamily: Noctuoidea
- Family: Erebidae
- Subfamily: Arctiinae
- Tribe: Lithosiini
- Genus: Sicciaemorpha van Eecke, 1920

Type species
- Sicciaemorpha ivyalba van Eecke, 1920

Genus of moths

Sicciaemorpha is a genus of moths in the subfamily Arctiinae. It contains seven species, which are found in eastern Asia.

== Species ==
- Sicciaemorpha danepan Volynkin & Černý, 2021
- Sicciaemorpha ivyalba van Eecke, 1920
- Sicciaemorpha langgona Volynkin & Černý, 2021
- Sicciaemorpha nebulibia Volynkin & Černý, 2021
- Sicciaemorpha pleiadina Volynkin & Černý, 2021
- Sicciaemorpha reducta Volynkin & Černý, 2021
- Sicciaemorpha yumun Volynkin & Černý, 2021
