= Amalodeta tineoides =

Scientific classification
- Domain: Eukaryota
- Kingdom: Animalia
- Phylum: Arthropoda
- Class: Insecta
- Order: Lepidoptera
- Superfamily: Noctuoidea
- Family: Erebidae
- Subfamily: Arctiinae
- Genus: Amalodeta
- Species: A. tineoides

Binomial name
- Amalodeta tineoides Wileman & West, 1928

Species of moth

Amalodeta tineoides is a moth of the subfamily Arctiinae. It is found in the Philippines.
