= Amalodeta electraula =

Scientific classification
- Kingdom: Animalia
- Phylum: Arthropoda
- Class: Insecta
- Order: Lepidoptera
- Superfamily: Noctuoidea
- Family: Erebidae
- Subfamily: Arctiinae
- Genus: Amalodeta
- Species: A. electraula

Binomial name
- Amalodeta electraula Meyrick, 1889

Species of moth

Amalodeta electraula is a moth of the subfamily Arctiinae. It is found in New Guinea.
