= Amalodeta =

Scientific classification
- Kingdom: Animalia
- Phylum: Arthropoda
- Class: Insecta
- Order: Lepidoptera
- Superfamily: Noctuoidea
- Family: Erebidae
- Subfamily: Arctiinae
- Tribe: Lithosiini
- Genus: Amalodeta; Meyrick, 1889

Genus of moths

Amalodeta is a genus of moths in the subfamily Arctiinae.

== Species ==
- Amalodeta electraula
- Amalodeta tineoides
