= List of moths of Japan (Noctuoidea) =

Partial list of Japanese moths

This is a list of the Japanese species of the superfamily Noctuoidea. It also acts as an index to the species articles and forms part of the full List of moths of Japan.

== Notodontidae ==
- フサオシャチホコ — Dudusa sphingiformis Moore, 1872
- ギンモンスズメモドキ — Tarsolepis japonica japonica Wileman & South, 1917
- トガリバシャチホコ — Phycidopsis albovittata Hampson, 1893
- ナントシャチホコ — Stauropus alternus (Walker, 1855)
- ヒメシャチホコ — Stauropus basalis basalis (Moore, 1877)
- シャチホコガ — Stauropus fagi persimilis Butler, 1879
- ゴマダラシャチホコ — Stauropus obliteratus (Wileman & South, 1917)
- テイキチシャチホコ — Stauropus teikichianus Matsumura, 1929
- アマミアオシャチホコ — Syntypistis amamiensis (Nakatomi, 1981)
- オオアオシャチホコ伊豆諸島以外亜種 — Syntypistis cyanea cyanea (Leech, [1889])
- オオアオシャチホコ伊豆諸島亜種 — Syntypistis cyanea izuensis (Nakamura & Kishida, 1977)
- アオシャチホコ — Syntypistis japonica (Nakatomi, 1981)
- ナチアオシャチホコ — Syntypistis nachiensis (Marumo, 1920)
- プライヤアオシャチホコ — Syntypistis pryeri (Leech, 1899)
- ブナアオシャチホコ — Syntypistis punctatella (Motschulsky, [1861])
- ホリシャシャチホコ — Syntypistis subgeneris (Strand, 1915)
- イリオモテアオシャチホコ — Vaneeckeia pallidifascia iriomotensis Nakatomi, 1980
- バイバラシロシャチホコ — Cnethodonta grisescens grisescens Staudinger, 1887
- シロシャチホコ — Cnethodonta japonica Sugi, 1980
- ニッコウシャチホコ — Shachia circumscripta (Butler, 1885)
- モクメシャチホコ — Cerura felina Butler, 1877
- オオモクメシャチホコ — Cerura menciana Moore, 1877
- タッタカモクメシャチホコ — Paracerura tattakana (Matsumura, 1927)
- ホシナカグロモクメシャチホコ — Furcula bicuspis (Borkhausen, 1790)
- ナカグロモクメシャチホコ — Furcula furcula sangaica (Moore, 1877)
- ツシマクロモンシャチホコ — Harpyia tokui (Sugi, 1977)
- ギンシャチホコ — Harpyia umbrosa (Staudinger, 1892)
- ネウスシャチホコ — Chadisra bipartita (Matsumura, 1925)
- モンクロギンシャチホコ — Wilemanus bidentatus bidentatus (Wileman, 1911)
- ムラサキシャチホコ — Uropyia meticulodina (Oberthür, 1884)
- ホソバシャチホコ — Fentonia ocypete (Bremer, 1861)
- クロシタシャチホコ — Mesophalera sigmata (Butler, 1877)
- ワイルマンネグロシャチホコ — Disparia nigrofasciata (Wileman, 1910)
- ホソバネグロシャチホコ — Disparia variegata sordida (Wileman, 1911)
- ヤクシマネグロシャチホコ — Neodrymonia acuminata (Matsumura, 1929)
- チョウセンネグロシャチホコ — Neodrymonia coreana Matsumura, 1922
- フタジマネグロシャチホコ — Neodrymonia delia (Leech, [1889])
- ハイイロネグロシャチホコ — Neodrymonia marginata (Matsumura, 1925)
- オオネグロシャチホコ — Eufentonia nihonica (Wileman, 1911)
- ムクツマキシャチホコ — Phalera angustipennis Matsumura, 1919
- ツマキシャチホコ — Phalera assimilis (Bremer & Grey, 1853)
- モンクロシャチホコ — Phalera flavescens (Bremer & Grey, 1853)
- クロツマキシャチホコ — Phalera minor Nagano, 1916
- タカサゴツマキシャチホコ — Phalera takasagoensis Matsumura, 1919
- ユミモンシャチホコ — Ellida arcuata (Alphéraky, 1897)
- クロテンシャチホコ — Ellida branickii (Oberthür, 1880)
- シロテンシャチホコ — Ellida viridimixta (Bremer, 1861)
- ナカスジシャチホコ — Nerice bipartita Butler, 1885
- シロスジシャチホコ — Nerice davidi Oberthür, 1881
- アカシャチホコ — Gangaridopsis citrina (Wileman, 1911)
- カバイロモクメシャチホコ — Hupodonta corticalis Butler, 1877
- スジモクメシャチホコ — Hupodonta lignea Matsumura, 1919
- ヘリスジシャチホコ — Neopheosia fasciata japonica Okano, 1955
- アオバシャチホコ — Zaranga permagna (Butler, 1881)
- クビワシャチホコ — Shaka atrovittatus (Bremer, 1861)
- クロスジシャチホコ — Lophocosma sarantuja Schintlmeister & Kinoshita, 1984
- セダカシャチホコ — Rabtala cristata (Butler, 1877)
- アオセダカシャチホコ — Rabtala splendida (Oberthür, 1880)
- トリゲキシャチホコ — Torigea plumosa (Leech, [1889])
- キシャチホコ — Torigea straminea (Moore, 1877)
- ウスキシャチホコ — Mimopydna pallida (Butler, 1877)
- カバイロシャチホコ — Ramesa tosta Walker, 1855
- トビネシャチホコ — Nephodonta tsushimensis Sugi, 1980
- シロジマシャチホコ — Pheosia rimosa fusiformis Matsumura, 1921
- マエジロシャチホコ — Notodonta albicosta (Matsumura, 1920)
- ウチキシャチホコ — Notodonta dembowskii Oberthür, 1879
- トビスジシャチホコ — Notodonta stigmatica Matsumura, 1920
- トビマダラシャチホコ — Notodonta torva sugitanii Matsumura, 1924
- ニトベシャチホコ — Peridea aliena (Staudinger, 1892)
- シノノメシャチホコ — Peridea elzet Kiriakoff, 1963
- ナカキシャチホコ — Peridea gigantea Butler, 1877
- イシダシャチホコ — Peridea graeseri (Staudinger, 1892)
- アカネシャチホコ — Peridea lativitta (Wileman, 1911)
- ルリモンシャチホコ — Peridea oberthueri (Staudinger, 1892)
- マルモンシャチホコ — Peridea rotundata (Matsumura, 1920)
- ネスジシャチホコ — Fusadonta basilinea (Wileman, 1911)
- スズキシャチホコ — Pheosiopsis cinerea (Butler, 1879)
- ウグイスシャチホコ — Pheosiopsis olivacea (Matsumura, 1920)
- アマギシャチホコ — Eriodonta amagisana (Marumo, 1933)
- ノヒラトビモンシャチホコ — Drymonia basalis Wileman & South, 1917
- トビモンシャチホコ — Drymonia dodonides (Staudinger, 1887)
- コトビモンシャチホコ — Drymonia japonica (Wileman, 1911)
- モンキシロシャチホコ — Leucodonta bicoloria ([Denis & Schiffermüller], 1775)
- カエデシャチホコ — Semidonta biloba (Oberthür, 1880)
- ハイイロシャチホコ — Microphalera grisea Butler, 1885
- ヤスジシャチホコ — Epodonta lineata (Oberthür, 1880)
- オオトビモンシャチホコ屋久島以北亜種 — Phalerodonta manleyi manleyi (Leech, [1889])
- オオトビモンシャチホコ琉球亜種 — Phalerodonta manleyi yambaru Kishida, 1995
- ミナミノクロシャチホコ — Hiradonta ohashii Nakatomi, 2000
- タカオシャチホコ — Hiradonta takaonis Matsumura, 1924
- ツマジロシャチホコ — Hexafrenum leucodera (Staudinger, 1892)
- タカムクシャチホコ — Takadonta takamukui Matsumura, 1920
- ウスグロシャチホコ — Epinotodonta fumosa Matsumura, 1919
- ハガタエグリシャチホコ — Hagapteryx admirabilis (Staudinger, 1887)
- ゲンカイハガタシャチホコ — Hagapteryx kishidai Nakamura, 1978
- スジエグリシャチホコ — Ptilodon hoegei (Graeser, 1888)
- エゾエグリシャチホコ — Ptilodon jezoensis (Matsumura, 1919)
- クワヤマエグリシャチホコ — Ptilodon kuwayamae (Matsumura, 1919)
- クロエグリシャチホコ — Ptilodon okanoi (Inoue, 1958)
- エグリシャチホコ — Ptilodon robustus (Matsumura, 1924)
- シロスジエグリシャチホコ — Fusapteryx ladislai (Oberthür, 1880)
- ウスヅマシャチホコ — Lophontosia cuculus (Staudinger, 1887)
- プライヤエグリシャチホコ — Lophontosia pryeri (Butler, 1879)
- コクシエグリシャチホコ — Odontosia marumoi Inoue, 1955
- シーベルスシャチホコ — Odontosia sieversii japonibia Matsumura, 1929
- ホッカイエグリシャチホコ — Odontosia walakui Kobayashi, 2006
- エゾクシヒゲシャチホコ — Ptilophora jezoensis (Matsumura, 1920)
- クシヒゲシャチホコ — Ptilophora nohirae (Matsumura, 1920)
- キエグリシャチホコ — Himeropteryx miraculosa Staudinger, 1887
- タテスジシャチホコ — Togepteryx velutina (Oberthür, 1880)
- ハネブサシャチホコ — Platychasma virgo Butler, 1881
- ギンモンシャチホコ — Spatalia dives Oberthür, 1884
- ウスイロギンモンシャチホコ — Spatalia doerriesi Graeser, 1888
- エゾギンモンシャチホコ — Spatalia jezoensis Wileman & South, 1916
- オオエグリシャチホコ — Pterostoma gigantinum Staudinger, 1892
- チョウセンエグリシャチホコ — Pterostoma griseum (Bremer, 1861)
- ギンボシシャチホコ — Rosama cinnamomea Leech, 1888
- トビギンボシシャチホコ — Rosama ornata (Oberthür, 1884)
- クワゴモドキシャチホコ — Gonoclostera timoniorum (Bremer, 1861)
- ヒナシャチホコ — Micromelalopha troglodyta (Graeser, 1890)
- コフタオビシャチホコ — Gluphisia crenata crenata (Esper, 1785)
- ニセツマアカシャチホコ — Clostera albosigma curtuloides Erschoff, 1870
- ツマアカシャチホコ — Clostera anachoreta ([Denis & Schiffermüller], 1775)
- セグロシャチホコ — Clostera anastomosis (Linnaeus, 1758)

== Lymantriidae ==
- スギドクガ — Calliteara argentata (Butler, 1881)
- スズキドクガ — Calliteara conjuncta (Wileman, 1911)
- アカヒゲドクガ — Calliteara lunulata (Butler, 1877)
- リンゴドクガ — Calliteara pseudabietis Butler, 1885
- シタキドクガ — Calliteara taiwana aurifera (Scriba, 1919)
- ウスジロドクガ — Calliteara virginea (Oberthür, 1879)
- マメドクガ — Cifuna locuples confusa (Bremer, 1861)
- ブドウドクガ — Ilema eurydice (Butler, 1880)
- ナチキシタドクガ — Ilema nachiensis (Marumo, 1917)
- ダイセツドクガ — Gynaephora rossii daisetsuzana (Matsumura, 1928)
- アカモンドクガ — Telochurus recens approximans (Butler, 1881)
- コシロモンドクガ — Orgyia postica (Walker, 1855)
- ヒメシロモンドクガ — Orgyia thyellina Butler, 1881
- ヤクシマドクガ — Orgyia triangularis Nomura, 1938
- スゲドクガ — Laelia coenosa sangaica Moore, 1877
- スゲオオドクガ — Laelia gigantea Butler, 1885
- クニガミスゲドクガ — Laelia kunigamiensis Kishida, 1995
- ツシマシロドクガ — Arctornis album (Bremer, 1861)
- ヒメシロドクガ — Arctornis chichibense (Matsumura, 1921)
- ニワトコドクガ — Arctornis jonasii (Butler, 1877)
- ヒメスカシドクガ — Arctornis kanazawai Inoue, 1982
- スカシドクガ — Arctornis kumatai Inoue, 1956
- エルモンドクガ — Arctornis l-nigrum ussuricum Bytinski-Salz, 1939
- ブチヒゲヤナギドクガ — Leucoma candida (Staudinger, 1892)
- ヤナギドクガ — Leucoma salicis (Linnaeus, 1758)
- キアシドクガ — Ivela auripes (Butler, 1877)
- ヒメキアシドクガ — Ivela ochropoda (Eversmann, 1847)
- シロオビドクガ本土亜種 — Numenes albofascia albofascia (Leech, [1889])
- シロオビドクガ屋久島亜種 — Numenes albofascia yakushimana Nomura, 1938
- コシロオビドクガ — Numenes disparilis Staudinger, 1887
- シロシタマイマイ — Lymantria albescens Hori & Umeno, 1930
- バンタイマイマイ — Lymantria bantaizana Matsumura, 1933
- マイマイガ — Lymantria dispar japonica (Motschulsky, 1861)
- オキナワマイマイ — Lymantria flavida Pogue & Schaefer, 2007
- ハラアカマイマイ — Lymantria fumida Butler, 1877
- オオヤママイマイ — Lymantria lucescens (Butler, 1881)
- カシワマイマイ — Lymantria mathura aurora Butler, 1877
- ミノオマイマイ屋久島以北亜種 — Lymantria minomonis minomonis Matsumura, 1934
- ミノオマイマイ奄美以南亜種 — Lymantria minomonis okinawaensis Kishida, 1987
- ノンネマイマイ — Lymantria monacha (Linnaeus, 1758)
- コシロシタマイマイ — Lymantria postalba Inoue, 1956
- エゾマイマイ — Lymantria umbrosa (Butler, 1881)
- マエグロマイマイ本土・対馬亜種 — Lymantria xylina nobunaga Nagano, 1912
- マエグロマイマイ屋久島以南亜種 — Lymantria xylina xylina Swinhoe, 1903
- ウチジロマイマイ — Parocneria furva (Leech, [1889])
- クロモンドクガ — Pida niphonis (Butler, 1881)
- チャドクガ — Arna pseudoconspersa (Strand, 1914)
- オキナワドクガ — Somena okinawana (Matsumura, 1921)
- ゴマフリドクガ — Somena pulverea (Leech, [1889])
- タイワンキドクガ — Orvasca taiwana (Shiraki, 1913)
- モンシロドクガ — Sphrageidus similis (Fuessly, 1775)
- カンシキドクガ — Artaxa kanshireia (Wileman, 1911)
- サカグチキドクガ — Artaxa sakaguchii (Matsumura, 1927)
- ドクガ — Artaxa subflava (Bremer, 1864)
- マガリキドクガ — Nygmia curvata (Wileman, 1911)
- フタホシドクガ — Nygmia staudingeri (Leech, [1889])
- キドクガ — Euproctis piperita Oberthür, 1880
- トラサンドクガ — Euproctis torasan (Holland, 1889)
- スキバドクガ — Perina nuda (Fabricius, 1878)

== Arctiidae ==
- ネズミホソバ — Pelosia angusta (Staudinger, 1887)
- ホシホソバ — Pelosia muscerda tetrasticta Hampson, 1900
- クロスジホソバ — Pelosia noctis (Butler, 1881)
- ヒメクロスジホソバ — Pelosia obtusa sutschana (Staudinger, 1892)
- クロミャクホソバ — Pelosia ramosula (Staudinger, 1887)
- トカラホソバ — Pelosia tokaraensis Kishida, 1993
- キシタホソバ — Eilema aegrota (Butler, 1877)
- キムジホソバ — Eilema affineola (Bremer, 1864)
- ヒメキマエホソバ — Eilema coreana (Leech, [1889])
- ヒメキホソバ — Eilema cribrata (Staudinger, 1887)
- シロホソバ — Eilema degenerella (Walker, 1863)
- ムジホソバ — Eilema deplana pavescens (Butler, 1877)
- シタクロホソバ — Eilema flavociliata (Lederer, 1853)
- ヤネホソバ — Eilema fuscodorsalis (Matsumura, 1930)
- ウスキシタホソバ — Eilema griseola submontana Inoue, 1982
- キマエホソバ北海道亜種 — Eilema japonica ainonis (Matsumura, 1927)
- キマエホソバ本州以南亜種 — Eilema japonica japonica (Leech, [1889])
- ツマキホソバ — Eilema laevis (Butler, 1877)
- ヒメツマキホソバ — Eilema minor Okano, 1955
- ニセキマエホソバ — Eilema nankingica (Daniel, 1954)
- ミヤマキベリホソバ — Eilema okanoi Inoue, 1961
- アマミキホソバ — Brunia antica (Walker, 1854)
- ナガサキムジホソバ — Tigrioides immaculatus (Butler, 1880)
- リュウキュウムジホソバ — Tigrioides pallens Inoue, 1980
- ルリモンホソバ — Chrysaeglia magnifica taiwana Hampson, 1914
- キマエクロホソバ — Ghoria collitoides Butler, 1885
- キベリネズミホソバ伊豆諸島亜種 — Ghoria gigantea flavipennis (Inoue & Maenami, 1963)
- キベリネズミホソバ伊豆諸島以外亜種 — Ghoria gigantea gigantea (Oberthür, 1879)
- マエグロホソバ — Conilepia nigricosta (Leech, [1889])
- ヨツボシホソバ — Lithosia quadra (Linnaeus, 1758)
- モンシロホソバ — Vamuna alboluteora (Rothschild, 1912)
- クビワウスグロホソバ — Macrobrochis staudingeri staudingeri (Alphéraky, 1897)
- ゴマフオオホソバ — Agrisius fuliginosus japonicus Leech, [1889]
- アカスジシロコケガ伊豆諸島以外亜種 — Cyana hamata hamata (Walker, 1854)
- アカスジシロコケガ伊豆諸島亜種 — Cyana hamata maenamii (Inoue & Kobayashi, 1963)
- キスジシロコケガ — Cyana harterti (Elwes, 1890)
- ヒトテンアカスジコケガ — Cyana unipunctata (Elwes, 1890)
- ウスクロスジチビコケガ — Stictane obscura (Inoue, 1976)
- クロスジチビコケガ — Stictane rectilinea chinesica (Draudt, 1931)
- クロモンエグリホソバ — Garudinia simulana (Walker, 1863)
- シロオビクロコケガ — Siccia minuta (Butler, 1881)
- ウスグロコケガ — Siccia obscura (Leech, [1889])
- バイバラホシコケガ — Siccia sordida (Butler, 1877)
- ホシオビコケガ — Aemene altaica (Lederer, 1855)
- クロテンシロコケガ — Aemene fukudai (Inoue, 1965)
- オオベニヘリコケガ九州亜種 — Melanaema venata kyushuensis Inoue, 1982
- オオベニヘリコケガ四国亜種 — Melanaema venata shikokuensis Inoue, 1982
- オオベニヘリコケガ北海道・本州亜種 — Melanaema venata venata Butler, 1877
- クロスジコケガ — Thumatha muscula (Staudinger, 1887)
- クシヒゲコケガ奄美以南亜種 — Thumatha ochracea bani (Kishida & Mano, 1997)
- クシヒゲコケガ屋久島以北亜種 — Thumatha ochracea ochracea (Bremer, 1861)
- ムモンウスキコケガ — Neasura melanopyga (Hampson, 1918)
- ヤクシマコケガ — Lyclene alikangiae intermedia (Marumo, 1923)
- ヒメホシキコケガ屋久島以北亜種 — Lyclene dharma butleri (Leech, [1889])
- ヒメホシキコケガ奄美以南亜種 — Lyclene dharma dharma (Moore, 1879)
- マエベニコケガ — Nipponasura sanguinea Inoue, 1965
- チビコケガ — Mithuna fuscivena Hampson, 1896
- フタホシキコケガ — Nudina artaxidia (Butler, 1881)
- キベリチビコケガ — Diduga flavicostata (Snellen, 1878)
- フタオビコケガ — Eugoa basipuncta (Hampson, 1891)
- クロテンハイイロコケガ — Eugoa grisea Butler, 1877
- ハガタベニコケガ本州・四国・九州・屋久島亜種 — Barsine aberrans aberrans (Butler, 1877)
- ハガタベニコケガ北海道亜種 — Barsine aberrans askoldensis (Oberthür, 1880)
- ハガタベニコケガ奄美以南亜種 — Barsine aberrans okinawana (Matsumura, 1930)
- サキシマベニコケガ — Barsine expressa (Inoue, 1988)
- ゴマダラベニコケガ — Barsine pulchra leacrita (Swinhoe, 1894)
- スジベニコケガ伊豆諸島亜種 — Barsine striata hachijoensis (Inoue & Maenami, 1963)
- スジベニコケガ伊豆諸島以外亜種 — Barsine striata striata (Bremer & Grey, 1853)
- ハガタキコケガ — Miltochrista calamina Butler, 1877
- ベニヘリコケガ — Miltochrista miniata rosaria Butler, 1877
- アマミハガタベニコケガ — Miltochrista ziczac (Walker, 1856)
- スジマガリベニコケガ — Asuridia carnipicta (Butler, 1877)
- ゴマダラキコケガ — Stigmatophora leacrita (Swinhoe, 1894)
- モンクロベニコケガ — Stigmatophora rhodophila (Walker, 1865)
- チャオビチビコケガ — Philenora latifasciata Inoue & Kobayashi, 1963
- ウスバフタホシコケガ — Schistophleps bipuncta Hampson, 1891
- スカシコケガ — Nudaria ranruna Matsumura, 1927
- ウスバチビコケガ — Nudaria unifascia (Inoue, 1980)
- ツマキカノコ — Amata flava aritai Inoue, 1965
- カノコガ — Amata fortunei fortunei (Orza, 1869)
- キハダカノコ — Amata germana nigricauda (Miyake, 1907)
- ムラマツカノコ — Syntomoides imaon (Cramer, 1779)
- リシリヒトリ — Hyphoraia aulica rishiriensis Matsumura, 1927
- アマヒトリ北海道亜種 — Phragmatobia amurensis amurensis Seitz, 1910
- アマヒトリ本州以南亜種 — Phragmatobia amurensis japonica Rothschild, 1910
- フタスジヒトリ — Spilarctia bifasciata Butler, 1881
- セスジヒトリ — Spilarctia graminivora Inoue, 1988
- キバネモンヒトリ — Spilarctia lutea japonica (Rothschild, 1910)
- フトスジモンヒトリ — Spilarctia obliquizonata (Miyake, 1910)
- アトアカヒトリ — Spilarctia postrubida (Wileman, 1910)
- スジモンヒトリ琉球亜種 — Spilarctia seriatopunctata azumai (Inoue, 1982)
- スジモンヒトリ奄美亜種 — Spilarctia seriatopunctata nuda (Inoue, 1976)
- スジモンヒトリ本土・対馬・屋久島亜種 — Spilarctia seriatopunctata seriatopunctata (Motschulsky, [1861])
- スジモンヒトリ伊豆諸島亜種 — Spilarctia seriatopunctata suzukii (Inoue & Maenami, 1963)
- オビヒトリ — Spilarctia subcarnea (Walker, 1855)
- アカヒトリ — Lemyra flammeola (Moore, 1877)
- クワゴマダラヒトリ — Lemyra imparilis (Butler, 1877)
- カクモンヒトリ屋久島以北亜種 — Lemyra inaequalis inaequalis (Butler, 1879)
- カクモンヒトリ奄美以南亜種 — Lemyra inaequalis sakaguchii (Matsumura, 1930)
- クロバネヒトリ — Lemyra infernalis (Butler, 1877)
- クロフシロヒトリ — Eospilarctia lewisii (Butler, 1885)
- キハラゴマダラヒトリ — Spilosoma lubricipedum sangaicum Walker, [1865]
- アカハラゴマダラヒトリ — Spilosoma punctarium (Stoll, 1782)
- シロヒトリ — Chionarctia nivea (Ménétriès, 1859)
- キバラヒトリ — Epatolmis caesarea japonica (Walker, [1865])
- ゴマベニシタヒトリ — Rhyparia purpurata gerda Warnecke, 1918
- ホシベニシタヒトリ — Rhyparioides amurensis nipponensis Kishida & Inomata, 1981
- コベニシタヒトリ — Rhyparioides metelkana flavida (Bremer, 1861)
- ベニシタヒトリ — Rhyparioides nebulosa Butler, 1877
- ヒメベニシタヒトリ — Rhyparioides subvaria (Walker, 1855)
- モンヘリアカヒトリ — Diacrisia irene Butler, 1881
- アメリカシロヒトリ — Hyphantria cunea (Drury, 1773)
- マエアカヒトリ — Aloa lactinea (Cramer, 1777)
- クロスジヒトリ — Creatonotos gangis (Linnaeus, 1763)
- ハイイロヒトリ — Creatonotos transiens koni Miyake, 1909
- ダイセツヒトリ — Grammia quenseli daisetsuzana (Matsumura, 1927)
- ヒメキシタヒトリ北海道亜種 — Parasemia plantaginis jezoensis Inoue, 1976
- ヒメキシタヒトリ上信山地亜種 — Parasemia plantaginis macromera (Butler, 1881)
- ヒメキシタヒトリ赤石山脈亜種 — Parasemia plantaginis melanissima Inoue, 1976
- ヒメキシタヒトリ飛騨山脈亜種 — Parasemia plantaginis melanomera (Butler, 1881)
- ジョウザンヒトリ — Pericallia matronula helena Dubatolov & Kishida, 2004
- ヒトリガ — Arctia caja phaeosoma (Butler, 1877)
- トラフヒトリ — Aglaomorpha histrio histrio (Walker, 1855)
- トラガモドキ — Nikaea matsumurai Kishida, 1983
- タイワンベニゴマダラヒトリ — Utetheisa lotrix lotrix (Cramer, 1777)
- ベニゴマダラヒトリ小笠原ほか亜種 — Utetheisa pulchelloides umata Jordan, 1939
- ベニゴマダラヒトリ小笠原以外亜種 — Utetheisa pulchelloides vaga Jordan, 1939
- モンシロモドキ — Nyctemera adversata (Schaller, 1788)
- デバリモンシロモドキ — Nyctemera carissima (Swinhoe, 1908)
- キハラモンシロモドキ — Nyctemera cenis (Cramer, 1777)
- ネッタイモンシロモドキ — Nyctemera coleta coleta (Stoll, 1781)
- ツマキモンシロモドキ — Nyctemera lacticinia (Cramer, 1777)
- オキナワモンシロモドキ — Pitasila okinawensis (Inoue, 1982)
- キゴマダラヒトリ — Argina astrea (Drury, 1773)

== Nolidae ==
- コマバシロコブガ — Nolathripa lactaria (Graeser, 1892)
- モモタマナコブガ — Sarbena ustipennis (Hampson, 1895)
- カバイロコブガ — Nola aerugula atomosa (Bremer, 1861)
- ホソバネコブガ — Nola angustipennis Inoue, 1982
- ミヤラビコブガ — Nola ceylonica Hampson, 1893
- ヒメコブガ — Nola confusalis (Herrich-Schäffer, 1847)
- ウスカバスジコブガ — Nola ebatoi (Inoue, 1970)
- ツマカバコブガ — Nola emi (Inoue, 1956)
- フタモンコブガ — Nola exumbrata Inoue, 1976
- クロバネコブガ — Nola funesta Inoue, 1991
- ヒラノコブガ — Nola hiranoi Inoue, 1991
- シタジロコブガ — Nola infralba Inoue, 1976
- シタクロコブガ — Nola infranigra Inoue, 1976
- クロフマエモンコブガ — Nola innocua Butler, 1880
- マエモンコブガ — Nola japonibia (Strand, 1920)
- シロオビコブガ — Nola kanshireiensis (Wileman & South, 1916)
- カズナリコブガ — Nola kazunarii Inoue, 2005
- ヒルギコブガ — Nola komaii Inoue, 2001
- ミチノクコブガ — Nola michinoku Sasaki, 2003
- ツマグロコブガ — Nola minutalis Leech, [1889]
- ナミコブガ — Nola nami (Inoue, 1956)
- シロバネコブガ — Nola neglecta Inoue, 1991
- ソトグロコブガ — Nola okanoi (Inoue, 1958)
- ムラサキコブガ — Nola sakishimana Inoue, 2001
- ヤクシマヒメコブガ — Nola semiconfusa Inoue, 1976
- エゾシロオビコブガ — Nola shin Inoue, 1982
- クロスジシロコブガ — Nola taeniata Snellen, 1874
- マルバコブガ — Nola thyrophora (Hampson, 1914)
- ミスジコブガ — Nola trilinea Marumo, 1923
- チョウカイシロコブガ — Nola umetsui Sasaki, 1993
- スミコブガ — Manoba banghaasi sumi (Inoue, 1956)
- テンスジコブガ — Manoba brunellus (Hampson, 1893)
- ソトジロコブガ — Manoba fasciatus Hampson, 1894
- トビモンコブガ — Manoba major caesiopennis (Inoue, 1982)
- ヨシノコブガ — Manoba melancholica (Wileman & West, 1928)
- シロフチビコブガ — Manoba microphasma (Butler, 1885)
- トビモンシロコブガ奄美以南亜種 — Meganola albula formosana (Wileman & West, 1928)
- トビモンシロコブガ屋久島以北亜種 — Meganola albula pacifica (Inoue, 1958)
- トウホクチビコブガ — Meganola basisignata Inoue, 1991
- モトグロコブガ北海道亜種 — Meganola bryophilalis basifascia (Inoue, 1958)
- モトグロコブガ本州以南亜種 — Meganola bryophilalis hondoensis (Inoue, 1970)
- ヘリグロコブガ — Meganola costalis (Staudinger, 1887)
- クロスジコブガ — Meganola fumosa (Butler, 1878)
- オオマエモンコブガ — Meganola gigantoides (Inoue, 1961)
- オオコブガ — Meganola gigas (Butler, 1884)
- ナカグロコブガ — Meganola mediofascia (Inoue, 1958)
- ミカボコブガ — Meganola mikabo (Inoue, 1970)
- ニセオオコブガ — Meganola protogigas (Inoue, 1970)
- ツマモンコブガ — Meganola pulchella (Leech, [1889])
- シメキクロコブガ — Meganola shimekii (Inoue, 1970)
- エチゴチビコブガ — Meganola strigulosa satoi (Inoue, 1970)
- キタオオコブガ — Meganola subgigas Inoue, 1982
- イナズマコブガ — Meganola triangulalis (Leech, [1889])
- リンゴコブガ — Evonima mandschuriana (Oberthür, 1880)
- ミドリリンガ — Clethrophora distincta (Leech, [1889])
- ツクシアオリンガ — Hylophilodes tsukusensis Nagano, 1918
- アオスジアオリンガ — Pseudoips prasinanus (Linnaeus, 1758)
- アカスジアオリンガ — Pseudoips sylpha (Butler, 1879)
- リュウキュウコリンガ — Narangodes haemorranta Hampson, 1910
- サラサリンガ — Camptoloma interioratum (Walker, [1865])
- カバシタリンガ — Xenochroa internifusca (Hampson, 1912)
- オレクギリンガ — Parhylophila celsiana (Staudinger, 1887)
- カバイロリンガ — Hypocarea conspicua (Leech, 1900)
- ウスアオリンガ — Paracrama angulata Sugi, 1985
- トビイロリンガ — Siglophora ferreilutea Hampson, 1895
- ギンボシリンガ — Ariolica argentea (Butler, 1881)
- ハイイロリンガ — Gabala argentata Butler, 1878
- アミメリンガ — Sinna extrema (Walker, 1854)
- ナミスジキノカワガ — Gyrtothripa pusilla (Moore, 1888)
- ツマジロキノカワガ — Etanna breviuscula (Walker, 1863)
- ネスジキノカワガ — Garella ruficirra (Hampson, 1905)
- クロスジキノカワガ — Nycteola asiatica (Krulikowski, 1904)
- マエシロモンキノカワガ — Nycteola costalis Sugi, 1959
- ミヤマクロスジキノカワガ — Nycteola degenerana eurasiatica Dufay, 1961
- クロテンキノカワガ — Nycteola dufayi Sugi, 1982
- ヒロバキノカワガ — Giaura tortricoides (Walker, [1866])
- チャオビリンガ — Maurilia iconica (Walker, 1858)
- スカシチャオビリンガ — Maceda mansueta Walker, 1858
- アカオビリンガ — Gelastocera exusta Butler, 1877
- クロオビリンガ — Gelastocera kotschubeji Obraztsov, 1943
- 和名未定 — Gelastocera ochroleucana Staudinger, 1887
- クロモンオビリンガ — Gelastocera rubicundula (Wileman, 1911)
- カマフリンガ — Macrochthonia fervens Butler, 1881
- ハネモンリンガ — Kerala decipiens (Butler, 1879)
- マエキリンガ — Iragaodes nobilis (Staudinger, 1887)
- シロズリンガ — Westermannia elliptica Bryk, 1913
- マガタマリンガ — Miaromima kobesi (Sugi, 1991)
- アジアキノカワガ — Blenina quinaria Moore, 1882
- キノカワガ — Blenina senex (Butler, 1878)
- ミナミキノカワガ — Risoba basalis Moore, 1881
- リュウキュウキノカワガ — Risoba prominens Moore, 1881
- ワタリンガ — Earias cupreoviridis (Walker, 1862)
- モモブトアオリンガ — Earias dilatifemur Sugi, 1982
- ウスベニアオリンガ — Earias erubescens Staudinger, 1887
- ミスジアオリンガ — Earias insulana (Boisduval, 1833)
- アカマエアオリンガ — Earias pudicana Staudinger, 1887
- ベニモンアオリンガ — Earias roseifera Butler, 1881
- オオベニモンアオリンガ — Earias roseoviridis Sugi, 1982
- クサオビリンガ — Earias vittella (Fabricius, 1794)
- ネジロキノカワガ — Negritothripa hampsoni (Wileman, 1911)
- ヤエヤマキノカワガ — Iscadia pulchra (Butler, 1886)
- ナンキンキノカワガ — Gadirtha impingens Walker, [1858]
- シンジュキノカワガ — Eligma narcissus narcissus (Cramer, 1775)
- マルバネキノカワガ — Selepa celtis Moore, 1860
- ウズモンキノカワガ — Selepa molybdea Hampson, 1912
- ギンバネキノカワガ — Macrobarasa xantholopha (Hampson, 1896)

== Pantheidae ==
- マルバネキシタケンモン — Trisuloides rotundipennis Sugi, 1976
- ホリシャキシタケンモン — Trisuloides sericea Butler, 1881
- コウスベリケンモン — Anacronicta caliginea (Butler, 1881)
- ウスベリケンモン — Anacronicta nitida (Butler, 1878)
- オキナワウスベリケンモン — Anacronicta okinawensis Sugi, 1970
- ナマリケンモン — Anacronicta plumbea (Butler, 1881)
- ニセキバラケンモン — Trichosea ainu (Wileman, 1911)
- キバラケンモン — Trichosea champa (Moore, 1879)
- キタキバラケンモン — Trichosea ludifica (Linnaeus, 1758)
- カラフトゴマケンモン — Panthea coenobita idae Bryk, 1949
- ネグロケンモン — Colocasia jezoensis (Matsumura, 1931)
- ケブカネグロケンモン — Colocasia mus (Oberthür, 1884)
- ヒメネグロケンモン — Colocasia umbrosa (Wileman, 1911)

== Noctuidae ==
- キシタヒトリモドキ — Asota caricae (Fabricius, 1775)
- キイロヒトリモドキ — Asota egens confinis Rothschild, 1897
- イチジクヒトリモドキ — Asota ficus (Fabricius, 1775)
- シロスジヒトリモドキ — Asota heliconia riukiuana Rothschild, 1897
- ホシヒトリモドキ — Asota plana lacteata (Butler, 1881)
- ミナミヒトリモドキ — Euplocia membliaria (Cramer, 1780)
- クロジャノメアツバ — Bocana manifestalis Walker, 1859
- キマエアツバ — Adrapsa ablualis Walker, 1859
- フジロアツバ — Adrapsa notigera (Butler, 1879)
- シラナミクロアツバ — Adrapsa simplex (Butler, 1879)
- ニセフジロアツバ — Adrapsa subnotigera Owada, 1982
- ソトウスグロアツバ — Hydrillodes lentalis Guenée, 1854
- ヒロオビウスグロアツバ — Hydrillodes morosus (Butler, 1879)
- マルバネウスグロアツバ — Hydrillodes pacificus Owada, 1982
- ハネブタアツバ — Hydrillodes uenoi Owada, 1987
- マルシラホシアツバ — Edessena gentiusalis Walker, [1859]
- オオシラホシアツバ — Edessena hamada (Felder & Rogenhofer, 1874)
- ハナマガリアツバ — Hadennia incongruens (Butler, 1879)
- シロテンハナマガリアツバ — Hadennia mysalis (Walker, 1859)
- ヒメハナマガリアツバ — Hadennia nakatanii Owada, 1979
- ソトウスアツバ — Hadennia obliqua (Wileman, 1911)
- フサキバアツバ — Mosopia sordida (Butler, 1879)
- キスジハナオイアツバ — Cidariplura bilineata (Wileman & South, 1919)
- ハナオイアツバ — Cidariplura gladiata Butler, 1879
- カギモンハナオイアツバ — Cidariplura signata (Butler, 1879)
- シロホシクロアツバ — Idia curvipalpis (Butler, 1879)
- ツマジロクロアツバ — Idia fulvipicta (Butler, 1889)
- キモンクロアツバ — Idia quadra (Graeser, [1889])
- シロモンアツバ — Paracolax albinotata (Butler, 1879)
- ハグルマアツバ — Paracolax angulata (Wileman, 1915)
- ニセミスジアツバ — Paracolax bilineata (Wileman, 1915)
- ホソキモンアツバ — Paracolax contigua (Leech, 1900)
- オビアツバ — Paracolax fascialis (Leech, 1889)
- ホソナミアツバ — Paracolax fentoni (Butler, 1879)
- ヤマトアツバ — Paracolax japonica Owada, 1987
- クロキバアツバ — Paracolax pacifica Owada, 1982
- シロテンムラサキアツバ — Paracolax pryeri (Butler, 1879)
- ウスキモンアツバ — Paracolax sugii Owada, 1992
- ミスジアツバ — Paracolax trilinealis (Bremer, 1864)
- クルマアツバ — Paracolax tristalis (Fabricius, 1794)
- フタスジアツバ — Bertula bistrigata (Staudinger, 1888)
- ウチキアツバ — Bertula sinuosa (Leech, 1900)
- シロスジアツバ — Bertula spacoalis (Walker, 1859)
- ヒメヒゲブトクロアツバ — Nodaria externalis Guenée, 1854
- オガサワラヒゲブトクロアツバ — Nodaria ogasawarensis Owada, 1987
- ヒゲブトクロアツバ — Nodaria tristis (Butler, 1879)
- イワアツバ — Megaloctena buxivora Owada, 1991
- リュウキュウアカマエアツバ — Simplicia caeneusalis (Walker, [1859])
- シロヘリアツバ — Simplicia mistacalis (Guenée, 1854)
- オオアカマエアツバ — Simplicia niphona (Butler, 1878)
- アカマエアツバ — Simplicia rectalis (Eversmann, 1842)
- ニセアカマエアツバ — Simplicia xanthoma Prout, 1928
- オオキイロアツバ — Pseudalelimma miwai Inoue, 1965
- カシワアツバ — Pechipogo strigilata (Linnaeus, 1758)
- ナガキバアツバ — Polypogon gryphalis (Herrich-Schäffer, 1851)
- 和名未定 — Polypogon tentacularia (Linnaeus, 1758)
- ホンドコブヒゲアツバ — Zanclognatha curvilinea (Wileman & South, 1917)
- ウスグロアツバ — Zanclognatha fumosa (Butler, 1879)
- ツマオビアツバ — Zanclognatha griselda (Butler, 1879)
- キイロアツバ — Zanclognatha helva (Butler, 1879)
- ウスイロアツバ — Zanclognatha lilacina (Butler, 1879)
- コブヒゲアツバ — Zanclognatha lunalis (Scopoli, 1763)
- ハスオビアツバ — Zanclognatha obliqua Staudinger, 1892
- カサイヌマアツバ — Zanclognatha perfractralis Bryk, 1948
- アミメアツバ — Zanclognatha reticulatis (Leech, 1900)
- コウスグロアツバ — Zanclognatha southi Owada, 1982
- ヒメツマオビアツバ — Zanclognatha subgriselda Sugi, 1959
- ヒメコブヒゲアツバ — Zanclognatha tarsipennalis (Treitschke, 1835)
- ツマテンコブヒゲアツバ — Zanclognatha triplex (Leech, 1900)
- チョウセンコウスグロアツバ — Zanclognatha umbrosalis Staudinger, 1892
- ウラジロアツバ — Zanclognatha violacealis Staudinger, 1892
- ヤエヤマコブヒゲアツバ — Zanclognatha yaeyamalis Owada, 1977
- ヤクシマコブヒゲアツバ — Zanclognatha yakushimalis Sugi, 1959
- ウスキミスジアツバ — Herminia arenosa Butler, 1878
- フシキアツバ — Herminia dolosa Butler, 1879
- クロスジアツバ — Herminia grisealis ([Denis & Schiffermüller], 1775)
- シラナミアツバ — Herminia innocens Butler, 1879
- ヒメナミアツバ — Herminia kurokoi Owada, 1987
- ヨスジカバイロアツバ — Herminia robiginosa (Staudinger, 1888)
- フサハラアツバ — Herminia ryukyuensis Owada, 1982
- キタミスジアツバ — Herminia stramentacealis Bremer, 1864
- トビスジアツバ — Herminia tarsicrinalis (Knoch, 1782)
- タイワンシラナミアツバ — Herminia terminalis (Wileman, 1915)
- オオシラナミアツバ — Hipoepa fractalis (Guenée, 1854)
- ハネナガキイロアツバ — Stenhypena longipennis Owada, 1982
- ムモンキイロアツバ — Stenhypena nigripuncta (Wileman, 1911)
- ミツオビキンアツバ — Sinarella aegrota (Butler, 1879)
- シーモンアツバ — Sinarella c-album Owada, 1992
- ウスナミアツバ — Sinarella itoi Owada, 1987
- クロミツボシアツバ — Sinarella japonica (Butler, 1881)
- クロテンナミアツバ — Sinarella nigrisigna (Leech, 1900)
- ネグロアツバ — Sinarella punctalis (Herz, 1905)
- ヒメクロアツバ — Sinarella rotundipennis Owada, 1982
- オスグロナミアツバ — Progonia kurosawai Owada, 1987
- オキナワナミアツバ — Progonia oileusalis (Walker, 1859)
- マエキトガリアツバ — Anoratha costalis Moore, 1867
- テングアツバ — Latirostrum bisacutum Hampson, 1895
- トガリアツバ — Rhynchina cramboides (Butler, 1879)
- ナカジロアツバ — Harita belinda (Butler, 1879)
- サザナミアツバ — Hypena abducalis Walker, 1859
- クロキシタアツバ — Hypena amica (Butler, 1878)
- キシタアツバ — Hypena claripennis (Butler, 1878)
- ウスベリアツバ — Hypena conscitalis Walker, [1866]
- ソトムラサキアツバ — Hypena ella Butler, 1878
- ヒトスジクロアツバ — Hypena furva Wileman, 1911
- セクロモンアツバ — Hypena gonospilalis Walker, 1866
- 和名未定 — Hypena hokkaidalis (Wileman & West, 1930)
- トビモンアツバ — Hypena indicatalis Walker, 1859
- ウスチャモンアツバ — Hypena innocuoides Poole, 1989
- ソトウスナミガタアツバ — Hypena kengkalis Bremer, 1864
- ランタナアツバ — Hypena laceratalis Guenée, 1859
- 和名未定 — Hypena leechi Sugi, 1982
- オスグロホソバアツバ — Hypena lignealis Walker, 1866
- スジアツバ — Hypena masurialis masurialis Guenée, 1854
- ムラサキミツボシアツバ — Hypena narratalis Walker, 1859
- オオトビモンアツバ — Hypena occata Moore, 1882
- フタオビアツバ — Hypena proboscidalis (Linnaeus, 1758)
- コテングアツバ — Hypena pulverulenta Wileman, 1911
- モンクロキシタアツバ — Hypena sagitta (Fabricius, 1775)
- サツマアツバ — Hypena satsumalis Leech, 1889
- ナミガタアツバ — Hypena similalis Leech, [1889]
- フタコブスジアツバ — Hypena sinuosa Wileman, 1911
- ナミテンアツバ — Hypena strigatus minna Butler, 1879
- アオアツバ — Hypena subcyanea Butler, 1880
- 和名未定 — Hypena tamsi Filipjev, 1927
- ヒトスジアツバ — Hypena tatorhina Butler, 1879
- タイワンキシタアツバ — Hypena trigonalis (Guenée, 1854)
- ミツボシアツバ — Hypena tristalis Lederer, 1853
- ホソバアツバ — Hypena whitelyi (Butler, 1879)
- 和名未定 — Hypena yoshinalis (Wileman & West, 1930)
- ナカシロテンアツバ — Bomolocha albopunctalis (Leech, [1889])
- アマミヤマガタアツバ — Bomolocha amamiensis Sugi, 1982
- シモフリヤマガタアツバ — Bomolocha benepartita Sugi, 1982
- マルモンウスヅマアツバ — Bomolocha bicoloralis Graeser, 1889
- エゾソトジロアツバ — Bomolocha bipartita Staudinger, 1892
- マガリウスヅマアツバ — Bomolocha mandarina (Leech, 1900)
- ムラクモアツバ — Bomolocha melanica Sugi, 1959
- ホシムラサキアツバ — Bomolocha nigrobasalis Herz, 1905
- ウスヅマアツバ — Bomolocha perspicua (Leech, 1900)
- アイモンアツバ — Bomolocha rivuligera (Butler, 1881)
- ミヤマソトジロアツバ — Bomolocha semialbata Sugi, 1982
- ハングロアツバ — Bomolocha squalida (Butler, 1879)
- ヤマガタアツバ — Bomolocha stygiana (Butler, 1878)
- シラクモアツバ — Bomolocha zilla (Butler, 1879)
- シラフアカガネアツバ — Rivula albipunctata Yoshimoto, 1996
- ネグロアトキリアツバ — Rivula basalis Hampson, 1891
- アトキリアツバ — Rivula cognata Hampson, 1912
- マエシロモンアツバ — Rivula curvifera Walker, 1862
- トビイロフタテンアツバ — Rivula errabunda Wileman, 1911
- フタテンアツバ — Rivula inconspicua (Butler, 1881)
- タケアツバ — Rivula leucanioides (Walker, [1863])
- クリイロアツバ — Rivula plumipars Hampson, 1907
- テンクロアツバ — Rivula sericealis (Scopoli, 1763)
- キクビムモンアツバ — Rivula unctalis Staudinger, 1892
- ナカジロフサヤガ — Penicillaria jocosatrix Guenée, 1852
- オビナカジロフサヤガ — Penicillaria maculata Butler, 1889
- シロモンフサヤガ — Phalga clarirena (Sugi, 1982)
- コフサヤガ — Eutelia adulatricoides (Mell, 1943)
- キマダラフサヤガ — Eutelia cuneades (Draudt, 1950)
- フサヤガ — Eutelia geyeri (Felder & Rogenhofer, 1874)
- ニッコウフサヤガ — Atacira grabczewskii (Püngeler, 1903)
- ウスイロフサヤガ — Atacira melanephra (Hampson, 1912)
- カドジロフサヤガ — Anigraea albomaculata Hampson, 1894
- ノコバフサヤガ — Anuga japonica (Leech, [1889])
- ヒメネグロフサヤガ — Targalla delatrix (Guenée, 1852)
- マンゴーフサヤガ — Chlumetia brevisigna Holloway, 1985
- スカシホソヤガ — Stictoptera cucullioides Guenée, 1852
- ソリバネホソヤガ — Aegilia describens (Walker, [1858])
- アオフホソヤガ — Lophoptera acuda (Swinhoe, 1906)
- チャマダラホソヤガ — Lophoptera anthyalus (Hampson, 1894)
- ヤマトホソヤガ — Lophoptera hayesi Sugi, 1982
- ネグロホソヤガ — Lophoptera phaeobasis Hampson, 1905
- シロスジクロホソヤガ — Lophoptera squammigera Guenée, 1852
- クロシタホソヤガ — Odontodes uniformis Berio, 1957
- マガリミジンアツバ — Hypenodes curvilineus Sugi, 1982
- ミジンアツバ — Hypenodes rectifascia Sugi, 1982
- ハスジミジンアツバ — Hypenodes turfosalis (Wocke, 1850)
- キマダラチビアツバ — Protoschrankia ijimai Sugi, 1979
- キオビマダラチビアツバ — Protoschrankia minuta Sugi, 1985
- ウスマダラチビアツバ — Protoschrankia murakii Sugi, 1979
- クロスジヒメアツバ — Schrankia costaestrigalis (Stephens, 1834)
- メスグロヒメアツバ — Schrankia dimorpha Inoue, 1979
- マルモンヒメアツバ — Schrankia kogii Inoue, 1979
- ウスオビヒメアツバ — Schrankia masuii Inoue, 1979
- アマミヒメアツバ — Schrankia seinoi Inoue, 1979
- ハスオビヒメアツバ — Schrankia separatalis (Herz, 1905)
- チビアツバ — Luceria fletcheri Inoue, 1958
- ミナミチビアツバ — Luceria oculalis (Moore, 1877)
- ウスイロアカキリバ — Anomis figlina Butler, 1889
- ワタアカキリバ — Cosmophila flava flava (Fabricius, 1775)
- コアカキリバ — Cosmophila lyona (Swinhoe, 1919)
- ヒメアカキリバ — Gonitis involuta (Walker, 1858)
- アカキリバ — Gonitis mesogona (Walker, 1858)
- オキナワオオアカキリバ — Rusicada albitibia (Walker, [1857-1858])
- カバイロオオアカキリバ — Rusicada fulvida (Guenée, 1852)
- ムラサキオオアカキリバ — Rusicada leucolopha Prout, 1928
- オオアカキリバ — Rusicada privata (Walker, 1865)
- ハガタキリバ — Scoliopteryx libatrix (Linnaeus, 1758)
- プライヤキリバ — Goniocraspidum pryeri (Leech, [1889])
- ハイイロオオエグリバ — Calyptra albivirgata (Hampson, 1926)
- オオエグリバ — Calyptra gruesa (Draudt, 1950)
- キタエグリバ — Calyptra hokkaida (Wileman, 1922)
- キンイロエグリバ — Calyptra lata (Butler, 1881)
- ミナミエグリバ — Calyptra minuticornis minuticornis (Guenée, 1852)
- マエスジエグリバ — Calyptra orthograpta (Butler, 1886)
- ウスエグリバ — Calyptra thalictri (Borkhausen, 1790)
- ギンスジエグリバ — Oraesia argyrosticta Moore, 1884
- ヒメエグリバ — Oraesia emarginata (Fabricius, 1794)
- アカエグリバ — Oraesia excavata (Butler, 1878)
- マダラエグリバ — Plusiodonta casta (Butler, 1878)
- キンモンエグリバ — Plusiodonta coelonota (Kollar, [1844])
- ミドリモンコノハ — Eudocima homaena (Hübner, [1823])
- ヒメアケビコノハ — Eudocima phalonia (Linnaeus, [1763])
- キマエコノハ — Eudocima salaminia (Cramer, 1777)
- アケビコノハ — Eudocima tyrannus (Guenée, 1852)
- ドウブトクチバ — Platyja umminia (Cramer, [1780])
- コシロシタバ — Catocala actaea Felder & Rogenhofer, 1874
- ハイモンキシタバ — Catocala agitatrix mabella Holland, 1889
- ノコメキシタバ — Catocala bella Butler, 1877
- ナマリキシタバ — Catocala columbina yoshihikoi Ishizuka, 2002
- ヨシノキシタバ — Catocala connexa Butler, 1881
- ケンモンキシタバ — Catocala deuteronympha omphale Butler, 1881
- エゾシロシタバ — Catocala dissimilis Bremer, 1861
- オニベニシタバ — Catocala dula dula Bremer, 1861
- マメキシタバ — Catocala duplicata Butler, 1885
- ベニシタバ — Catocala electa zalmunna Butler, 1877
- ミヤマキシタバ — Catocala ella Butler, 1877
- ムラサキシタバ — Catocala fraxini jezoensis Matsumura, 1931
- ワモンキシタバ — Catocala fulminea xarippe Butler, 1877
- アミメキシタバ — Catocala hyperconnexa Sugi, 1965
- ウスイロキシタバ — Catocala intacta intacta Leech, [1889]
- ジョナスキシタバ — Catocala jonasii Butler, 1877
- アズミキシタバ — Catocala koreana Staudinger, 1892
- クロシオキシタバ — Catocala kuangtungensis sugii Ishizuka, 2002
- オオシロシタバ — Catocala lara lara Bremer, 1861
- アマミキシタバ — Catocala macula (Hampson, 1891)
- カバフキシタバ — Catocala mirifica Butler, 1877
- ヒメシロシタバ — Catocala nagioides Wileman, 1924
- シロシタバ — Catocala nivea nivea Butler, 1877
- ゴマシオキシタバ — Catocala nubila Butler, 1881
- エゾベニシタバ — Catocala nupta nozawae Matsumura, 1911
- キシタバ — Catocala patala Felder & Rogenhofer, 1874
- コガタキシタバ — Catocala praegnax praegnax Walker, [1858]
- フシキキシタバ — Catocala separans Leech, [1889]
- アサマキシタバ — Catocala streckeri Staudinger, 1888
- ヤクシマヒメキシタバ — Catocala tokui tokui Sugi, 1976
- ヒロオビクロモンシタバ — Ophiusa disjungens indiscriminata (Hampson, 1893)
- コクロモンシタバ — Ophiusa microtirhaca Sugi, 1990
- コヘリグロクチバ — Ophiusa olista (Swinhoe, 1893)
- クロモンシタバ — Ophiusa tirhaca (Cramer, 1777)
- キバネヘリグロクチバ — Ophiusa trapezium (Guenée, 1852)
- ヘリグロクチバ — Ophiusa triphaenoides (Walker, 1858)
- キモンクチバ — Ophisma gravata Guenée, 1852
- シラホシアシブトクチバ — Achaea janata (Linnaeus, 1758)
- オオシラホシアシブトクチバ — Achaea serva (Fabricius, 1775)
- タイリクアシブトクチバ — Dysgonia mandschurica (Staudinger, 1892)
- アシブトクチバ — Dysgonia stuposa (Fabricius, 1794)
- オキナワアシブトクチバ — Bastilla arcuata (Moore, 1887)
- キオビアシブトクチバ — Bastilla fulvotaenia (Guenée, 1852)
- ナタモンアシブトクチバ — Bastilla joviana (Stoll, 1782)
- ムラサキアシブトクチバ — Bastilla maturata (Walker, 1858)
- ホソオビアシブトクチバ — Parallelia arctotaenia (Guenée, 1852)
- ヒメアシブトクチバ — Parallelia dulcis (Butler, 1878)
- ツマムラサキクチバ — Pindara illibata (Fabricius, 1775)
- ババアシブトクチバ — Buzara onelia (Guenée, 1852)
- シロモンアシブトクチバ — Macaldenia palumba (Guenée, 1852)
- ナカグロクチバ — Grammodes geometrica (Fabricius, 1775)
- スジボソサンカククチバ — Chalciope mygdon (Cramer, 1777)
- ツメクサキシタバ — Euclidia dentata Staudinger, 1871
- ニセウンモンクチバ — Mocis ancilla (Warren, 1913)
- ウンモンクチバ — Mocis annetta (Butler, 1878)
- ヒメウンモンクチバ — Mocis dolosa (Butler, 1880)
- ウスオビクチバ — Mocis frugalis (Fabricius, 1775)
- オオウンモンクチバ — Mocis undata (Fabricius, 1775)
- サンカククチバ — Trigonodes hyppasia hyppasia (Cramer, 1779)
- フタクロオビクチバ — Melapia bifasciata (Inoue & Sugi, 1961)
- ユミモンクチバ — Melapia electaria (Bremer, 1864)
- クロスジユミモンクチバ — Melapia japonica (Ogata, 1961)
- ヤエヤマサンカククチバ — Melapia kishidai Sugi, 1968
- チズモンクチバ — Avatha discolor (Fabricius, 1794)
- シラホシモクメクチバ — Ercheia dubia (Butler, 1874)
- モンシロムラサキクチバ — Ercheia niveostrigata Warren, 1913
- モンムラサキクチバ — Ercheia umbrosa Butler, 1881
- シロオビクチバ — Cortyta grisea (Leech, 1900)
- ベニモンコノハ — Phyllodes consobrinus Westwood, 1848
- キシタアシブトクチバ — Thyas coronata (Fabricius, 1775)
- シタベニコノハ — Thyas honesta Hübner, [1824]
- ムクゲコノハ — Thyas juno (Dalman, 1823)
- Tochara creberrima (Walker, 1858)
- ツキワクチバ — Artena dotata (Fabricius, 1794)
- フクラスズメ — Arcte coerula (Guenée, 1852)
- オオムラサキクチバ — Anisoneura aluco (Fabricius, 1775)
- ヤエナミクチバ — Anisoneura salebrosa (Guenée, 1852)
- ホウオウボククチバ — Pericyma cruegeri (Butler, 1886)
- カキバトモエ — Hypopyra vespertilio (Fabricius, 1787)
- ハグルマトモエ — Spirama helicina (Hübner, [1831])
- オスグロトモエ — Spirama retorta (Clerck, 1759)
- オオトモエ — Erebus ephesperis (Hübner, [1823])
- ヨコヅナトモエ — Erebus macrops (Linnaeus, 1768)
- シロスジトモエ — Metopta rectifasciata (Ménétriès, 1863)
- モクメクチバ — Perinaenia accipiter (Felder & Rogenhofer, 1874)
- ハイマダラクチバ — Autophila inconspicua (Butler, 1881)
- ツマキオオクチバ — Hulodes caranea (Cramer, 1780)
- ハイイロクビグロクチバ — Lygephila craccae ([Denis & Schiffermüller], 1775)
- ナニワクビグロクチバ — Lygephila lilacina (Butler, 1878)
- クビグロクチバ — Lygephila maxima (Bremer, 1861)
- スミレクビグロクチバ — Lygephila nigricostata (Graeser, 1890)
- エゾクビグロクチバ — Lygephila pastinum (Treitschke, 1826)
- ヒメクビグロクチバ — Lygephila recta (Bremer, 1864)
- キタヒメクビグロクチバ — Lygephila subrecta Sugi, 1982
- ウスクビグロクチバ — Lygephila viciae (Hübner, [1822])
- アサマクビグロクチバ — Lygephila vulcanea (Butler, 1881)
- ヒロオビキシタクチバ — Hypocala biarcuata Walker, 1858
- ムーアキシタクチバ — Hypocala deflorata deflorata (Fabricius, 1794)
- インドキシタクチバ — Hypocala rostrata (Fabricius, 1794)
- タイワンキシタクチバ — Hypocala subsatura Guenée, 1852
- ヘリボシキシタクチバ — Hypocala violacea Butler, 1879
- サビモンルリオビクチバ — Ischyja ferrifracta Walker, 1864
- オオルリオビクチバ — Ischyja manlia (Cramer, 1776)
- コルリモンクチバ — Lacera noctilio (Fabricius, 1794)
- ルリモンクチバ — Lacera procellosa Butler, 1879
- アカテンクチバ — Erygia apicalis Guenée, 1852
- ネジロフトクチバ — Serrodes campanus Guenée, 1852
- クロミミモンクチバ — Oxyodes scrobiculatus scrobiculatus (Fabricius, 1775)
- クロシラフクチバ — Sypnoides fumosus (Butler, 1877)
- アヤシラフクチバ — Sypnoides hercules (Butler, 1881)
- シラフクチバ — Sypnoides picta (Butler, 1877)
- シロテンクチバ — Hypersypnoides astrigera (Butler, 1885)
- オオシロテンクチバ — Hypersypnoides submarginata (Walker, 1865)
- ハガタクチバ — Daddala lucilla (Butler, 1881)
- サザナミクチバ — Polydesma boarmoides Guenée, 1852
- ホラズミクチバ — Speiredonia inocellata Sugi, 1996
- ヤエヤマウスムラサキクチバ — Ericeia inangulata (Guenée, 1852)
- ウスムラサキクチバ — Ericeia pertendens (Walker, 1858)
- ホソバウスムラサキクチバ — Ericeia subcinerea (Snellen, 1880)
- ハイイロクチバ — Pandesma quenavadi Guenée, 1852
- クロモンハイイロクチバ — Bamra albicola (Walker, 1858)
- クロエリクチバ — Pantydia metaspila (Walker, 1858)
- ゴマコウンモンクチバ — Blasticorhinus rivulosa (Walker, 1865)
- コウンモンクチバ — Blasticorhinus ussuriensis (Bremer, 1861)
- クマモトナカジロシタバ — Aedia kumamotonis (Matsumura, 1926)
- ナカジロシタバ — Aedia leucomelas (Linnaeus, 1758)
- ヒメナカジロシタバ — Ecpatia longinquua (Swinhoe, 1890)
- カクモンキシタバ — Chrysorithrum amatum (Bremer & Grey, 1853)
- ウンモンキシタバ — Chrysorithrum flavomaculatum (Bremer, 1861)
- ツマグロクチバ — Borsippa diffusa (Swinhoe, 1890)
- マルモンクチバ — Bocula caradrinoides Guenée, 1852
- ウスヅマクチバ — Dinumma deponens Walker, 1858
- ヒメウスヅマクチバ — Dinumma placens Walker, 1858
- ミミモンクチバ — Anticarsia irrorata (Fabricius, 1781)
- カバフキリバ — Episparis okinawensis Sugi, 1982
- ハナジロクチバ — Hypospila bolinoides Guenée, 1852
- ウスズミクチバ — Hyposemansis singha Guenée, 1852
- オオトウウスグロクチバ — Avitta fasciosa Moore, 1882
- ウスグロクチバ — Avitta puncta Wileman, 1911
- イナズマヒメクチバ — Mecodina albodentata (Swinhoe, 1895)
- カバフヒメクチバ — Mecodina cineracea (Butler, 1879)
- フトオビシャクドウクチバ — Mecodina fasciata Sugi, 1982
- オキナワマエモンヒメクチバ — Mecodina kurosawai Sugi, 1982
- シャクドウクチバ — Mecodina nubiferalis (Leech, 1889)
- ムラサキヒメクチバ — Mecodina subviolacea (Butler, 1881)
- アマミシャクドウクチバ — Mecodina sugii Seino, 2003
- ヒゲナガヒメクチバ — Seneratia praecipua (Walker, 1865)
- ソトジロツマキリクチバ — Arytrura musculus (Ménétriès, 1859)
- チョウセンツマキリアツバ — Tamba corealis (Leech, 1889)
- ウスベニツマキリアツバ — Tamba gensanalis (Leech, 1889)
- カザリツマキリアツバ — Tamba igniflua (Wileman & South, 1917)
- トウカイツマキリアツバ — Tamba roseopurpurea Sugi, 1982
- 和名未定 — Tamba suffusa Wileman, 1911
- ウスモモイロアツバ — Olulis ayumiae Sugi, 1982
- ツマムラサキアツバ — Olulis japonica Sugi, 1982
- ソトハガタアツバ — Olulis puncticinctalis Walker, 1863
- ツマエビイロアツバ — Olulis shigakii Sugi, 1982
- ソトウスベニアツバ — Sarcopteron fasciatum (Wileman & South, 1917)
- クロシモフリアツバ — Atuntsea kogii (Sugi, 1977)
- マエホシツマキリアツバ — Tipasa renalis (Moore, [1885])
- マエモンツマキリアツバ — Pangrapta costinotata (Butler, 1881)
- ムラサキツマキリアツバ — Pangrapta curtalis (Walker, [1866])
- ナカグロツマキリアツバ — Pangrapta disruptalis (Walker, [1855])
- キモンツマキリアツバ — Pangrapta flavomacula Staudinger, 1888
- ツマジロツマキリアツバ — Pangrapta lunulata (Sterz, 1915)
- アサマツマキリアツバ — Pangrapta minor Sugi, 1982
- リンゴツマキリアツバ — Pangrapta obscurata (Butler, 1879)
- ウンモンツマキリアツバ — Pangrapta perturbans (Walker, 1858)
- シロツマキリアツバ — Pangrapta porphyrea (Butler, 1879)
- ウゴウンモンツマキリアツバ — Pangrapta suaveola Staudinger, 1888
- ツシマツマキリアツバ — Pangrapta trilineata (Leech, 1900)
- シロモンツマキリアツバ — Pangrapta umbrosa (Leech, 1900)
- ミツボシツマキリアツバ — Pangrapta vasava (Butler, 1881)
- ヨシノツマキリアツバ — Pangrapta yoshinensis Wileman & West, 1928
- マンレイツマキリアツバ — Polysciera manleyi (Leech, 1900)
- ホソツマキリアツバ — Stenograpta stenoptera Sugi, 1959
- シロテンツマキリアツバ — Amphitrogia amphidecta (Butler, 1879)
- ホソキバツマキリアツバ — Cultripalpa partita Guenée, 1852
- マエベニモンツマキリアツバ — Ectogoniella insularis Sugi, 1982
- ツマグロエグリアツバ — Nagadeba indecoralis Walker, [1866]
- ウラモンシロクチバ — Masca abactalis Walker, [1859]
- アトホシボシアツバ — Caduca albopunctata (Walker, [1858])
- アトエグリアツバ — Arsacia rectalis (Walker, 1863)
- マノアツバ — Goniocraspedon manoi Yoshimoto, 1993
- ミカドアツバ — Lophomilia flaviplaga (Warren, 1912)
- キマダラアツバ — Lophomilia polybapta (Butler, 1879)
- ニセミカドアツバ — Lophomilia takao Sugi, 1962
- ヒメエグリアツバ — Euwilemania angulata (Wileman, 1911)
- シロテンアツバ — Stenbergmania albomaculalis (Bremer, 1864)
- フタスジエグリアツバ — Gonepatica opalina (Butler, 1879)
- シマアツバ — Hepatica linealis (Leech, 1889)
- ナンキシマアツバ — Hepatica nakatanii Sugi, 1982
- ヤエヤマシマアツバ — Hepatica seinoi Sugi, 1982
- ナミグルマアツバ — Anatatha lignea (Butler, 1879)
- ヒメナミグルマアツバ — Anatatha misae Sugi, 1982
- クロオビアツバ — Anatatha wilemani (Sugi, 1958)
- ムラサキアツバ — Diomea cremata (Butler, 1878)
- ヨツモンムラサキアツバ — Diomea discisigna Sugi, 1963
- ミナミマエヘリモンアツバ — Diomea insulana Yoshimoto, 2001
- マエヘリモンアツバ — Diomea jankowskii (Oberthür, 1880)
- マエジロアツバ — Hypostrotia cinerea (Butler, 1878)
- ウスマダラアツバ — Scedopla diffusa Sugi, 1959
- アマミソトグロアツバ — Scedopla inouei Sugi, 1982
- キヅマアツバ — Scedopla regalis Butler, 1878
- トビフタスジアツバ — Leiostola mollis (Butler, 1879)
- ムスジアツバ — Loxioda parva Sugi, 1982
- キイロソトオビアツバ — Draganodes coronata Sugi, 1982
- ベニトガリアツバ — Naganoella timandra (Alphéraky, 1897)
- コハイイロアツバ — Gesonia obeditalis Walker, 1859
- ベニスジアツバ — Phytometra amata (Butler, 1879)
- 和名未定 — Phytometra hebescens (Butler, 1879)
- 和名未定 — Phytometra pryeri (Wileman & South, 1917)
- ダルマアツバ — Daona bilinealis (Leech, 1900)
- リュウキュウダルマアツバ — Daona mansueta Walker, 1864
- ニジオビベニアツバ — Homodes vivida Guenée, 1852
- オビマダラアツバ — Raparna roseata Wileman & South, 1917
- 和名未定 — Raparna transversa Moore, 1882
- ソトキイロアツバ — Oglasa bifidalis (Leech, 1889)
- チャイロアツバ — Britha inambitiosa (Leech, 1900)
- キンスジアツバ — Colobochyla salicalis ([Denis & Schiffermüller], 1775)
- ヒメエビイロアツバ — Maguda suffusa (Walker, 1863)
- マエクロモンアツバ — Panilla costipunctata Leech, 1900
- オオトウアツバ — Panilla petrina (Butler, 1879)
- マエテンアツバ — Rhesala imparata Walker, 1858
- カギアツバ — Laspeyria flexula ([Denis & Schiffermüller], 1775)
- キボシアツバ — Paragabara flavomacula (Oberthür, 1880)
- チャバネキボシアツバ — Paragabara ochreipennis Sugi, 1962
- セニジモンアツバ — Paragona cleorides Wileman, 1911
- ウスグロセニジモンアツバ — Paragona inchoata (Wileman, 1911)
- ヨコハマセニジモンアツバ — Paragona multisignata (Christoph, 1888)
- アトヘリヒトホシアツバ — Hemipsectra fallax (Butler, 1879)
- スジモンアツバ — Microxyla confusa (Wileman, 1911)
- マエフタモンアツバ — Prolophota trigonifera Hampson, 1896
- コウスクモチビアツバ — Micreremites azumai Sugi, 1982
- ウスクモチビアツバ — Micreremites japonica Sugi, 1982
- ニセウスクモチビアツバ — Micreremites pallens Sugi, 1987
- ウラモンチビアツバ — Micreremites pyraloides Sugi, 1982
- ミスジチャイロアツバ — Dunira diplogramma (Hampson, 1912)
- チャバネクチバ — Condate orsilla (Swinhoe, 1897)
- スソミダレアツバ — Pilipectus prunifera (Hampson, 1894)
- クロクモアツバ — Acantholipes trajectus (Walker, 1865)
- アマミカバアツバ — Anachrostis amamiana Sugi, 1982
- ホソバカバアツバ — Anachrostis minutissima Sugi, 1982
- クロテンカバアツバ — Anachrostis nigripunctalis (Wileman, 1911)
- フタテンチビアツバ — Neachrostia bipuncta Sugi, 1982
- キイロチビアツバ — Neachrostia purpureoflava Sugi, 1982
- ウスオビチビアツバ — Mimachrostia fasciata Sugi, 1982
- キテンチビアツバ — Mimachrostia owadai Sugi, 1982
- シロズアツバ — Ectogonia butleri (Leech, 1900)
- ヒロバチビトガリアツバ — Hypenomorpha calamina (Butler, 1879)
- チビトガリアツバ — Hypenomorpha falcipennis (Inoue, 1958)
- アヤナミアツバ — Zekelita plusioides (Butler, 1879)
- フタキボシアツバ — Gynaephila maculifera Staudinger, 1892
- ミナミフタキボシアツバ — Gynaephila punctirena Sugi, 1982
- エダヒゲキボシアツバ — Naarda pectinata Sugi, 1982
- チビクロアツバ — Chibidokuga hypenodes Inoue, 1979
- ユミガタマダラウワバ — Abrostola abrostolina (Butler, 1879)
- 和名未定 — Abrostola korbi Dufay, 1958
- オオマダラウワバ — Abrostola major Dufay, 1957
- ミヤママダラウワバ — Abrostola pacifica Dufay, 1960
- ウスグロマダラウワバ — Abrostola sugii Dufay, 1960
- イラクサマダラウワバ — Abrostola triplasia (Linnaeus, 1758)
- エゾマダラウワバ — Abrostola ussuriensis Dufay, 1958
- エゾキンウワバ — Euchalcia sergia (Oberthür, 1884)
- アカキンウワバ — Polychrysia aurata (Staudinger, 1888)
- マダラキンウワバ — Polychrysia splendida (Butler, 1878)
- シーモンキンウワバ — Lamprotes mikadina (Butler, 1878)
- ムラサキウワバ — Plusidia cheiranthi (Tauscher, 1809)
- キクギンウワバ — Macdunnoughia confusa (Stephens, 1850)
- オオキクギンウワバ — Macdunnoughia crassisigna (Warren, 1913)
- 和名未定 — Macdunnoughia hybrida Ronkay, 1986
- ギンモンシロウワバ — Macdunnoughia purissima (Butler, 1878)
- ワイギンモンウワバ — Sclerogenia jessica (Butler, 1878)
- ギンボシキンウワバ — Antoculeora locuples (Oberthür, 1880)
- セアカキンウワバ — Erythroplusia pyropia (Butler, 1879)
- ギンスジキンウワバ — Erythroplusia rutilifrons (Walker, 1858)
- キシタギンウワバ — Syngrapha ain (Hochenwarth, 1785)
- ホクトギンウワバ — Syngrapha interrogationis (Linnaeus, 1758)
- アルプスギンウワバ — Syngrapha ottolenguii (Dyar, 1903)
- オオムラサキキンウワバ — Autographa amurica (Staudinger, 1892)
- ムラサキキンウワバ — Autographa buraetica (Staudinger, 1892)
- タンポキンウワバ — Autographa excelsa (Kretschmar, 1862)
- ガマキンウワバ — Autographa gamma (Linnaeus, 1758)
- ケイギンモンウワバ — Autographa mandarina (Freyer, 1846)
- タマナギンウワバ — Autographa nigrisigna (Walker, 1858)
- エゾムラサキキンウワバ — Autographa urupina (Bryk, 1942)
- イネキンウワバ — Plusia festucae (Linnaeus, 1758)
- 和名未定 — Plusia putnami festata Graeser, 1889
- ニセマガリキンウワバ — Diachrysia bieti (Oberthür, 1884)
- エゾヒサゴキンウワバ — Diachrysia chrysitis (Linnaeus, 1758)
- オオキンウワバ — Diachrysia chryson (Esper, 1789)
- リョクモンオオキンウワバ — Diachrysia coreae (Bryk, 1949)
- マガリキンウワバ — Diachrysia leonina (Oberthür, 1884)
- コヒサゴキンウワバ — Diachrysia nadeja (Oberthür, 1880)
- オオヒサゴキンウワバ — Diachrysia stenochrysis (Warren, 1913)
- シロスジキンウワバ — Diachrysia zosimi (Hübner, [1822])
- アミメギンウワバ — Trichoplusia daubei (Boisduval, 1840)
- ハスモンキンウワバ — Trichoplusia lectula (Walker, 1858)
- イラクサギンウワバ — Trichoplusia ni (Hübner, [1803])
- キクキンウワバ — Thysanoplusia intermixta (Warren, 1913)
- ネッタイキクキンウワバ — Thysanoplusia orichalcea (Fabricius, 1775)
- クロガネキンウワバ — Scriptoplusia nigriluna (Walker, [1858])
- コセアカキンウワバ — Zonoplusia ochreata (Walker, 1865)
- ミツモンキンウワバ — Ctenoplusia agnata (Staudinger, 1892)
- エゾギクキンウワバ — Ctenoplusia albostriata (Bremer & Grey, 1853)
- ニシキキンウワバ — Ctenoplusia ichinosei (Dufay, 1965)
- ドウガネキンウワバ — Ctenoplusia placida (Moore, 1884)
- ホソバネキンウワバ — Chrysodeixis acuta (Walker, 1853)
- イチジクキンウワバ — Chrysodeixis eriosoma (Doubleday, 1843)
- イブシギンウワバ — Chrysodeixis heberachis (Strand, 1920)
- ヒメクロキンウワバ — Chrysodeixis minutus Dufay, 1970
- ヒゴキンウワバ — Chrysodeixis taiwani Dufay, 1974
- モモイロキンウワバ — Anadevidia hebetata (Butler, 1889)
- ウリキンウワバ — Anadevidia peponis (Fabricius, 1775)
- ハナダカキンウワバ — Plusiopalpa adrasta (Felder & Rogenhofer, 1874)
- コモンキンウワバ — Dactyloplusia impulsa (Walker, 1865)
- サザナミキンウワバ — Dactyloplusia mutans (Walker, 1865)
- シラホシコヤガ — Enispa bimaculata (Staudinger, 1892)
- キスジコヤガ — Enispa lutefascialis (Leech, 1889)
- サザナミコヤガ — Enispa masuii Sugi, 1982
- ミジンベニコヤガ — Ectoblemma rosella Sugi, 1982
- ソトオビヒメコヤガ — Acidaliodes perstriata (Hampson, 1907)
- ミナミハイイロコヤガ — Mataeomera biangulata (Wileman, 1915)
- ハイイロコヤガ — Mataeomera obliquisigna (Hampson, 1894)
- クロハナコヤガ — Aventiola pusilla (Butler, 1879)
- イガコヤガ — Manoblemma cryptica Yoshimoto, 1999
- カバイロシマコヤガ — Corgatha argillacea (Butler, 1879)
- モモイロシマコヤガ — Corgatha costimacula (Staudinger, 1892)
- シロスジシマコヤガ — Corgatha dictaria (Walker, 1861)
- ハイイロシマコヤガ — Corgatha fusca Tanaka, 1973
- ヨツテンシマコヤガ — Corgatha fusciceps Sugi, 1982
- フタスジシマコヤガ — Corgatha marumoi Sugi, 1982
- シマフコヤガ — Corgatha nitens (Butler, 1879)
- ツマベニシマコヤガ — Corgatha obsoleta Marumo, 1932
- ベニシマコヤガ — Corgatha pygmaea Wileman, 1911
- マエグロシマコヤガ — Corgatha semiobsoleta Yoshimoto, 1999
- ヒメシロスジシマコヤガ — Corgatha zonalis Walker, [1859]
- ハスオビトガリコヤガ — Parasada carnosa (Hampson, 1893)
- ウスベニエグリコヤガ — Holocryptis erubescens (Hampson, 1893)
- ベニエグリコヤガ — Holocryptis nymphula (Rebel, 1909)
- シロエグリコヤガ — Holocryptis ussuriensis (Rebel, 1901)
- アヤホソコヤガ — Araeopteron amoenum Inoue, 1958
- シロホソコヤガ — Araeopteron flaccidum Inoue, 1958
- マダラホソコヤガ — Araeopteron fragmentum Inoue, 1965
- クロモンホソコヤガ — Araeopteron kurokoi Inoue, 1958
- ウスグロホソコヤガ — Araeopteron nebulosum Inoue, 1965
- ウラモンエグリコヤガ — Decticryptis deleta (Moore, 1885)
- ベニミスジコヤガ — Autoba trilinea (de Joannis, 1909)
- ツマトビコヤガ — Autoba tristalis (Leech, 1889)
- ベニチラシコヤガ — Eublemma amasina (Eversmann, 1842)
- ソトベニコヤガ — Eublemma anachoresis (Wallengren, 1863)
- ヨスジコヤガ — Eublemma baccalix (Swinhoe, 1886)
- シラホシベニコヤガ — Eublemma cochylioides (Guenée, 1852)
- ベニスジコヤガ — Eublemma dimidialis (Fabricius, 1794)
- ハイマダラコヤガ — Eublemma miasma (Hampson, 1891)
- セブトコヤガ — Eublemma quadrapex (Hampson, 1891)
- ナカオビシロコヤガ — Eublemma rivula (Moore, 1882)
- ツマテンコヤガ — Honeyania ragusana (Freyer, 1844)
- テンモンシマコヤガ — Sophta ruficeps (Walker, 1864)
- ウスベニコヤガ — Sophta subrosea (Butler, 1881)
- ヤマトコヤガ — Arasada ornata (Wileman, 1911)
- チャイロコヤガ — Carmara subcervina Walker, 1863
- ウスキツマキリコヤガ — Lophoruza lunifera (Moore, 1885)
- モモイロツマキリコヤガ — Lophoruza pulcherrima (Butler, 1879)
- ウスキコヤガ — Oruza brunnea (Leech, 1900)
- ヒメクルマコヤガ — Oruza divisa (Walker, 1862)
- モンシロクルマコヤガ — Oruza glaucotorna Hampson, 1910
- アトキスジクルマコヤガ — Oruza mira (Butler, 1879)
- リュウキュウクルマコヤガ — Oruza obliquaria Marumo, 1932
- マダラクルマコヤガ — Oruza stragulata (Pagenstecher, 1900)
- アトテンクルマコヤガ — Oruza submira Sugi, 1982
- ヨシノクルマコヤガ — Oruza yoshinoensis (Wileman, 1911)
- シロオビクルマコヤガ — Trisateles emortualis ([Denis & Schiffermüller], 1775)
- マエウストガリコヤガ — Hyposada hirashimai Sugi, 1982
- ソトキボシコヤガ — Niaccaba sumptualis Walker, 1866
- ヒメゴマフコヤガ — Metaemene atrigutta maculata (Leech, [1889])
- アトジロコヤガ — Metaemene hampsoni Wileman, 1914
- ヒメオビコヤガ — Maliattha arefacta (Butler, 1879)
- ソトムラサキコヤガ — Maliattha bella (Staudinger, 1888)
- ネジロコヤガ — Maliattha chalcogramma (Bryk, 1949)
- ナカウスキコヤガ — Maliattha khasanica Zolotarenko & Dubatolov, 1995
- ベニモンコヤガ — Maliattha rosacea (Leech, [1889])
- ハスオビコヤガ — Maliattha separata Walker, 1863
- ヒメネジロコヤガ — Maliattha signifera (Walker, 1858)
- フタスジコヤガ — Deltote bankiana amurula (Staudinger, 1892)
- マダラコヤガ — Deltote nemorum (Oberthür, 1880)
- スジコヤガ — Deltote uncula (Clerck, 1759)
- シロヒシモンコヤガ — Micardia argentata Butler, 1878
- フタホシコヤガ — Micardia pulchra Butler, 1878
- シロマダラコヤガ — Protodeltote distinguenda (Staudinger, 1888)
- ニセシロマダラコヤガ — Protodeltote inexpectata Ueda, 1987
- シロフコヤガ — Protodeltote pygarga (Hufnagel, 1766)
- マガリスジコヤガ — Protodeltote wiscotti (Staudinger, 1888)
- トビモンコヤガ — Pseudodeltote brunnea (Leech, [1889])
- スジシロコヤガ — Koyaga falsa (Butler, 1885)
- キモンコヤガ — Koyaga numisma (Staudinger, 1888)
- クロモンコヤガ — Koyaga senex (Butler, 1881)
- ミドリシロモンコヤガ — Koyaga virescens (Sugi, 1958)
- キバネシロフコヤガ — Sugia elaeostygia (Sugi, 1982)
- ニセシロフコヤガ — Sugia erastroides (Draudt, 1950)
- ネモンシロフコヤガ — Sugia idiostygia (Sugi, 1958)
- ウスシロフコヤガ — Sugia stygia (Butler, 1878)
- シロモンコヤガ — Erastroides fentoni (Butler, 1881)
- 和名未定 — Lithacodia squalida (Leech, [1889])
- ミスズコヤガ — Paraphyllophila confusa Kononenko, 1985
- ビロードコヤガ — Anterastria atrata (Butler, 1881)
- アオスジコヤガ — Inabaia culta (Butler, 1879)
- ウチジロコヤガ — Neustrotia albicincta (Hampson, 1898)
- ウスチャマエモンコヤガ — Neustrotia costimacula (Oberthür, 1880)
- マエモンコヤガ — Neustrotia japonica (Warren, 1912)
- エゾコヤガ — Neustrotia noloides (Butler, 1879)
- ナカキマエモンコヤガ — Neustrotia sugii (Tanaka, 1973)
- ミイロコヤガ — Shiraia tripartita (Leech, 1900)
- ナカクロモンコヤガ — Pseudeustrotia bipartita (Wileman, 1914)
- タデコヤガ — Pseudeustrotia candidula ([Denis & Schiffermüller], 1775)
- シラクモコヤガ — Hapalotis venustula (Hübner, 1790)
- ウスアオモンコヤガ — Bryophilina mollicula (Graeser, 1889)
- オキナワウスイロコヤガ — Azumaia micardiopsis Sugi, 1982
- モンキコヤガ — Hyperstrotia flavipuncta (Leech, [1889])
- シロフタオビコヤガ — Eulocastra excisa (Swinhoe, 1885)
- シラユキコヤガ — Eulocastra sasakii Sugi, 1985
- モトグロコヤガ — Xanthograpta basinigra Sugi, 1982
- ヨモギコヤガ — Phyllophila obliterata cretacea Butler, 1879
- ウスベニホシコヤガ — Ozarba brunnea (Leech, 1900)
- ホシコヤガ — Ozarba punctigera Walker, 1865
- ヤジリモンコヤガ — Ozana chinensis (Leech, 1900)
- フタオビコヤガ — Naranga aenescens Moore, 1881
- フタイロコヤガ — Acontia bicolora Leech, 1889
- ウスキマダラコヤガ — Acontia marmoralis (Fabricius, 1794)
- セマルモンコヤガ — Acontia olivacea (Hampson, 1891)
- キマダラコヤガ — Emmelia trabealis (Scopoli, 1763)
- ノシメコヤガ — Sinocharis korbae Püngeler, 1912
- ヒメシロテンコヤガ — Amyna axis Guenée, 1852
- マドバネサビイロコヤガ — Amyna natalis (Walker, 1859)
- クロコサビイロコヤガ — Amyna punctum (Fabricius, 1794)
- サビイロコヤガ — Amyna stellata Butler, 1878
- トビイロトラガ — Sarbanissa subflava (Moore, 1877)
- ベニモントラガ — Sarbanissa venusta (Leech, [1889])
- ツリフネソウトラガ — Sarbanissa yunnana (Mell, 1936)
- マイコトラガ本土亜種 — Maikona jezoensis jezoensis Matsumura, 1928
- マイコトラガ屋久島亜種 — Maikona jezoensis tenebricosa Inoue, 1982
- ヒメトラガ — Asteropetes noctuina (Butler, 1878)
- コトラガ — Mimeusemia persimilis Butler, 1875
- トラガ — Chelonomorpha japana japana Motschulsky, 1861
- アオモンギンセダカモクメ — Cucullia argentea (Hufnagel, 1766)
- トカチセダカモクメ — Cucullia artemisiae perspicua Warnecke, 1919
- タカネキクセダカモクメ — Cucullia elongata Butler, 1880
- ホソバセダカモクメ — Cucullia fraterna Butler, 1878
- ホシヒメセダカモクメ — Cucullia fraudatrix Eversmann, 1837
- ギンモンセダカモクメ — Cucullia jankowskii Oberthür, 1884
- キクセダカモクメ — Cucullia kurilullia kurilullia Bryk, 1942
- ミヤマセダカモクメ — Cucullia lucifuga ([Denis & Schiffermüller], 1775)
- ハイイロセダカモクメ — Cucullia maculosa Staudinger, 1888
- ダイセンセダカモクメ — Cucullia mandschuriae Oberthür, 1884
- セダカモクメ — Cucullia perforata Bremer, 1861
- ハマセダカモクメ — Cucullia scopariae Dorfmeister, 1853
- クビジロツメヨトウ — Oncocnemis campicola Lederer, 1853
- シレトコツメヨトウ — Oncocnemis senica (Eversmann, 1856)
- クロダケタカネヨトウ — Sympistis funebris kurodakeana Matsumura, 1927
- タカネヨトウ — Sympistis heliophila (Paykull, 1793)
- タカセモクメキリガ — Brachionycha albicilia Sugi, 1970
- エゾモクメキリガ — Brachionycha nubeculosa jezoensis Matsumura, 1928
- タニガワモクメキリガ — Brachionycha permixta Sugi, 1970
- ミヤマゴマキリガ上信以外山地亜種 — Feralia sauberi montana (Sugi, 1968)
- ミヤマゴマキリガ上信山地亜種 — Feralia sauberi pernigra Sugi, 1982
- ケンモンミドリキリガ — Daseochaeta viridis (Leech, [1889])
- オオウスヅマカラスヨトウ — Amphipyra erebina Butler, 1878
- ナンカイカラスヨトウ — Amphipyra horiei Owada, 1996
- カラスヨトウ — Amphipyra livida corvina Motschulsky, 1866
- オオシマカラスヨトウ — Amphipyra monolitha surnia Felder & Rogenhofer, 1874
- クロシマカラスヨトウ — Amphipyra okinawensis Sugi, 1982
- ムラマツカラスヨトウ — Amphipyra perflua (Fabricius, 1787)
- シマカラスヨトウ — Amphipyra pyramidea yama Swinhoe, 1918
- ツマジロカラスヨトウ — Amphipyra schrenckii Ménétriès, 1859
- ユワンカラスヨトウ — Amphipyra sublivida Owada, 1988
- ヤヒコカラスヨトウ — Amphipyra subrigua Bremer & Grey, 1853
- シロスジカラスヨトウ — Amphipyra tripartita Butler, 1878
- ミツモンケンモン — Cymatophoropsis trimaculata (Bremer, 1861)
- ホソバミツモンケンモン — Cymatophoropsis unca (Houlbert, 1921)
- アオケンモン — Belciades niveola (Motschulsky, 1866)
- キシタアオバケンモン — Euromoia subpulchra (Alphéraky, 1897)
- ゴマケンモン — Moma alpium (Osbeck, 1778)
- キクビゴマケンモン — Moma kolthoffi Bryk, 1948
- ツシマゴマケンモン — Moma tsushimana Sugi, 1982
- ニッコウアオケンモン — Nacna malachitis (Oberthür, 1880)
- スギタニアオケンモン — Nacna sugitanii (Nagano, 1918)
- スギタニゴマケンモン — Harrisimemna marmorata Hampson, 1908
- ヒメケンモン — Gerbathodes angusta (Butler, 1879)
- シロフヒメケンモン — Gerbathodes paupera (Staudinger, 1892)
- オオケンモン — Acronicta major (Bremer, 1861)
- シロケンモン — Acronicta vulpina leporella Staudinger, 1888
- サクラケンモン — Hyboma adaucta (Warren, 1909)
- ジョウザンケンモン — Hyboma jozana (Matsumura, 1926)
- エゾサクラケンモン — Hyboma strigosa sachalinensis (Matsumura, 1925)
- オオモリケンモン — Molybdonycta omorii (Matsumura, 1926)
- シロモンケンモン — Plataplecta albistigma (Hampson, 1909)
- アサケンモン — Plataplecta pruinosa (Guenée, 1852)
- シロハラケンモン — Plataplecta pulverosa (Hampson, 1909)
- ハイイロケンモン — Plataplecta tegminalis (Sugi, 1979)
- オオホソバケンモン — Triaena cuspis (Hübner, [1813])
- リンゴケンモン — Triaena intermedia (Warren, 1909)
- ゴマシオケンモン — Triaena isocuspis (Sugi, 1968)
- キハダケンモン本州以南亜種 — Triaena leucocuspis leucocuspis (Butler, 1878)
- キハダケンモン北海道亜種 — Triaena leucocuspis sapporensis (Matsumura, 1926)
- ウスムラサキケンモン — Triaena subpurpurea (Matsumura, 1926)
- ヒメリンゴケンモン — Triaena sugii Kinoshita, 1990
- ハンノケンモン — Jocheaera alni (Linnaeus, 1758)
- ウスズミケンモン — Hylonycta carbonaria (Graeser, 1889)
- キシタケンモン — Hylonycta catocaloida (Graeser, 1889)
- シロシタケンモン — Hylonycta hercules (Felder & Rogenhofer, 1874)
- マダラウスズミケンモン — Hylonycta subornata (Leech, [1889])
- シベチャケンモン — Subacronicta concerpta (Draudt, 1937)
- クビグロケンモン — Viminia digna (Butler, 1881)
- ウスジロケンモン — Viminia lutea leucoptera (Butler, 1881)
- ナシケンモン — Viminia rumicis (Linnaeus, 1758)
- タテスジケンモン — Simyra albovenosa (Goeze, 1781)
- ウスハイイロケンモン — Subleuconycta palshkovi (Filipjev, 1937)
- シマケンモン — Craniophora fasciata (Moore, 1884)
- タカオケンモン — Craniophora harmandi (Poujade, 1898)
- クロフケンモン — Craniophora jankowskii (Oberthür, 1880)
- イボタケンモン — Craniophora ligustri ([Denis & Schiffermüller], 1775)
- ネジロシマケンモン — Craniophora oda (Lattin, 1949)
- クシロツマジロケンモン — Craniophora pacifica Filipjev, 1927
- ニッコウケンモン — Craniophora praeclara (Graeser, 1890)
- ウスイロケンモン — Thalatha japonica Sugi, 1982
- シロフクロケンモン — Narcotica niveosparsa (Matsumura, 1926)
- アミメケンモン — Lophonycta confusa (Leech, [1889])
- ムラサキアミメケンモン — Lophonycta nigropurpurata Sugi, 1985
- マルモンキノコヨトウ — Bryomoia melachlora (Staudinger, 1892)
- イチモジキノコヨトウ — Bryophila granitalis (Butler, 1881)
- シレトコキノコヨトウ — Bryophila orthogramma (Boursin, 1954)
- コイチモジキノコヨトウ — Bryophila parva Sugi, 1980
- エゾキノコヨトウ — Cryphia bryophasma Boursin, 1951
- ハイイロキノコヨトウ — Cryphia griseola (Nagano, 1918)
- ミナミキノコヨトウ — Cryphia maritima Sugi, 1980
- スジキノコヨトウ — Cryphia mediofusca Sugi, 1959
- ヒメスジキノコヨトウ — Cryphia minutissima (Draudt, 1950)
- キノコヨトウ — Cryphia mitsuhashi (Marumo, 1917)
- マダラキノコヨトウ — Cryphia sugitanii Boursin, 1961
- スズキキノコヨトウ — Cryphia suzukiella (Matsumura, 1931)
- アオキノコヨトウ — Stenoloba assimilis assimilis (Warren, 1909)
- ウスアオキノコヨトウ — Stenoloba clara (Leech, [1889])
- シロスジキノコヨトウ — Stenoloba jankowskii (Oberthür, 1885)
- ウンモンキノコヨトウ本土亜種 — Stenoloba manleyi manleyi (Leech, [1889])
- ウンモンキノコヨトウ奄美以南亜種 — Stenoloba manleyi ryukyuensis Kononenko & Ronkay, 2000
- ヘリボシキノコヨトウ — Stenoloba oculata Draudt, 1950
- アオイガ — Xanthodes albago (Fabricius, 1794)
- ヒトトガリコヤガ — Xanthodes intersepta Guenée, 1852
- フタトガリコヤガ — Xanthodes transversa Guenée, 1852
- コマルモンシロガ — Sphragifera biplaga (Walker, 1858)
- マルモンシロガ — Sphragifera sigillata (Ménétriès, 1859)
- シロガ — Chasmina candida (Walker, 1865)
- オガサワラシロガ — Chasmina takakuwai Kishida, 2006
- ツマモンキリガ — Imosca coreana (Matsumura, 1926)
- フタクロアツバ — Brevipecten consanguis Leech, 1900
- チャバネシロホシクロヨトウ — Condica albigutta (Wileman, 1912)
- マルデオオホシミミヨトウ — Condica aroana (Bethune-Baker, 1906)
- セブトシロホシクロヨトウ — Condica dolorosa (Walker, 1865)
- マエテンヨトウ — Condica fuliginosa (Leech, 1900)
- オオホシミミヨトウ — Condica illecta (Walker, 1865)
- ヘリグロヒメヨトウ — Condica illustrata (Staudinger, 1888)
- ウスホシミミヨトウ — Condica pallescens (Sugi, 1970)
- ヒメホシミミヨトウ — Condica serva (Walker, 1858)
- シロテンクロヨトウ — Prospalta cyclica (Hampson, 1908)
- オオタバコガ — Helicoverpa armigera armigera (Hübner, [1808])
- タバコガ — Helicoverpa assulta assulta (Guenée, 1852)
- クロタバコガ — Helicoverpa sugii Yoshimatsu, 2004
- ヨモギガ — Schinia scutosa ([Denis & Schiffermüller], 1775)
- ギンスジアカヤガ — Heliothis bivittata (Walker, 1856)
- トガリウスアカヤガ — Heliothis cruentana (Moore, 1881)
- ツメクサガ — Heliothis maritima adaucta Butler, 1878
- ニセタバコガ — Heliocheilus fervens (Butler, 1881)
- ウスオビヤガ — Pyrrhia bifasciata (Staudinger, 1888)
- キタバコガ — Pyrrhia umbra (Hufnagel, 1766)
- アカヘリヤガ — Adisura atkinsoni Moore, 1881
- アミメツマキリヨトウ — Callopistria aethiops Butler, 1878
- シロスジツマキリヨトウ — Callopistria albolineola (Graeser, 1889)
- ギンツマキリヨトウ — Callopistria argyrosticta (Butler, 1881)
- ヒメツマキリヨトウ — Callopistria duplicans Walker, 1858
- ネボシツマキリヨトウ — Callopistria guttulalis Hampson, 1896
- キスジツマキリヨトウ — Callopistria japonibia Inoue & Sugi, 1958
- ムラサキツマキリヨトウ — Callopistria juventina (Stoll, 1782)
- ナカウスツマキリヨトウ — Callopistria maillardi maillardi (Guenée, 1862)
- ミナミツマキリヨトウ — Callopistria nobilior Eda, 2000
- アヤナミツマキリヨトウ — Callopistria placodoides (Guenée, 1852)
- コガタツマキリヨトウ — Callopistria pulchrilinea (Walker, 1862)
- マダラツマキリヨトウ — Callopistria repleta Walker, 1858
- クロキスジツマキリヨトウ — Callopistria rivularis Walker, 1858
- ツマナミツマキリヨトウ — Data clava (Leech, 1900)
- シロアミメヨトウ — Pseuderiopus albiscriptus (Hampson, 1898)
- オオチャイロヨトウ — Polia bombycina grisea (Butler, 1878)
- オオシモフリヨトウ — Polia goliath (Oberthür, 1880)
- クロヨトウ — Polia mortua (Staudinger, 1888)
- オオシラホシヨトウ — Polia nebulosa (Hufnagel, 1766)
- シラホシヨトウ — Melanchra persicariae (Linnaeus, 1761)
- マメヨトウ — Melanchra pisi nyiwonis (Matsumura, 1925)
- アトジロシラホシヨトウ — Melanchra postalba Sugi, 1982
- ヨトウガ — Mamestra brassicae (Linnaeus, 1758)
- オイワケクロヨトウ — Lacanobia aliena amurensis (Staudinger, 1901)
- ムラサキヨトウ — Lacanobia contigua ([Denis & Schiffermüller], 1775)
- ミヤマヨトウ — Lacanobia contrastata (Bryk, 1942)
- シロスジヨトウ — Lacanobia oleracea (Linnaeus, 1758)
- エゾチャイロヨトウ — Lacanobia splendens (Hübner, [1808])
- タカネハイイロヨトウ — Papestra biren (Goeze, 1781)
- シロシタヨトウ — Sarcopolia illoba (Butler, 1878)
- キミャクヨトウ — Dictyestra dissecta (Walker, 1865)
- オーロラヨトウ — Lasionycta skraelingia (Herrich-Schäffer, 1852)
- コイズミヨトウ — Hadula melanopa koizumidakeana (Matsumura, 1927)
- キタダケヨトウ — Hadula odontites (Boisduval, 1829)
- タイリクウスイロヨトウ — Hadula trifolii (Hufnagel, 1766)
- ダイセツキシタヨトウ — Coranarta carbonaria (Christoph, 1893)
- フサクビヨトウ — Sideridis honeyi honeyi (Yoshimoto, 1989)
- アサギリヨトウ — Sideridis incommoda (Staudinger, 1888)
- モモイロフサクビヨトウ — Sideridis mandarina (Leech, 1900)
- フジシロミャクヨトウ — Sideridis texturata (Alphéraky, 1892)
- ヒメムラサキヨトウ — Sideridis unica (Leech, [1889])
- コハイイロヨトウ — Hadena aberrans (Eversmann, 1856)
- シロオビヨトウ — Hadena compta ([Denis & Schiffermüller], 1775)
- ヒメハイイロヨトウ — Hadena corrupta (Herz, 1898)
- コグレヨトウ北海道亜種 — Hadena variolata dealbata (Staudinger, 1892)
- コグレヨトウ本州以南亜種 — Hadena variolata kogurei Sugi, 1958
- フタスジヨトウ — Protomiselia bilinea (Hampson, 1905)
- クロスジキリガ奄美亜種 — Xylopolia bella amamiensis (Kishida & Yoshimoto, 1979)
- クロスジキリガ屋久島以北亜種 — Xylopolia bella bella (Butler, 1881)
- ケンモンキリガ — Egira saxea (Leech, [1889])
- マツキリガ — Panolis japonica Draudt, 1935
- アズサキリガ — Pseudopanolis azusa Sugi, 1968
- タカオキリガ — Pseudopanolis takao Inaba, 1927
- キンイロキリガ — Clavipalpula aurariae (Oberthür, 1880)
- シベチャキリガ — Perigrapha circumducta (Lederer, 1855)
- スギタニキリガ — Perigrapha hoenei Püngeler, 1914
- ホソバキリガ — Anorthoa angustipennis (Matsumura, 1926)
- スモモキリガ — Anorthoa munda ([Denis & Schiffermüller], 1775)
- アオヤマキリガ — Orthosia aoyamensis (Matsumura, 1926)
- アカバキリガ — Orthosia carnipennis (Butler, 1878)
- ウスベニキリガ — Orthosia cedermarki (Bryk, 1949)
- ゴマフキリガ — Orthosia coniortota (Filipjev, 1927)
- ヨモギキリガ — Orthosia ella (Butler, 1878)
- カバキリガ — Orthosia evanida (Butler, 1879)
- クロテンキリガ — Orthosia fausta Leech, [1889]
- カシワキリガ — Orthosia gothica jezoensis (Matsumura, 1926)
- イイジマキリガ — Orthosia ijimai Sugi, 1955
- ミヤマカバキリガ — Orthosia incerta incognita Sugi, 1955
- シロヘリキリガ — Orthosia limbata (Butler, 1879)
- クロミミキリガ — Orthosia lizetta Butler, 1878
- カギモンキリガ — Orthosia nigromaculata (Höne, 1917)
- チャイロキリガ — Orthosia odiosa (Butler, 1878)
- ブナキリガ — Orthosia paromoea (Hampson, 1905)
- ナマリキリガ — Orthosia satoi Sugi, 1960
- ヒゴキリガ — Orthosia yoshizakii Sugi & Ohtsuka, 1984
- アトジロキリガ — Dioszeghyana mirabilis (Sugi, 1955)
- オオノコバヨトウ — Tiracola aureata Holloway, 1989
- ノコバヨトウ — Tiracola plagiata (Walker, 1857)
- ミカワキヨトウ — Mythimna bani (Sugi, 1977)
- クロテンキヨトウ — Mythimna chosenicola (Bryk, 1949)
- アトジロキヨトウ — Mythimna compta (Moore, 1881)
- シロテンキヨトウ — Mythimna conigera ([Denis & Schiffermüller], 1775)
- ウスアカキヨトウ — Mythimna curvilinea (Hampson, 1891)
- コウラギンキヨトウ — Mythimna decisissima (Walker, 1865)
- ナガフタオビキヨトウ — Mythimna divergens Butler, 1878
- ナカスジキヨトウ — Mythimna flammea (Curtis, 1828)
- マダラキヨトウ — Mythimna flavostigma (Bremer, 1861)
- オキナワマダラキヨトウ — Mythimna formosana (Butler, 1880)
- オオフタオビキヨトウ — Mythimna grandis Butler, 1878
- ウラギンキヨトウ — Mythimna hamifera (Walker, 1862)
- ヨシノキヨトウ — Mythimna impura (Hübner, [1808])
- ウスイロキヨトウ — Mythimna inanis (Oberthür, 1880)
- ツマアカキヨトウ — Mythimna inornata (Leech, [1889])
- アマミキヨトウ — Mythimna inouei (Sugi, 1965)
- カバイロキヨトウ — Mythimna iodochra (Sugi, 1982)
- コガタキヨトウ — Mythimna irrorata (Moore, 1881)
- クジュウキヨトウ — Mythimna lineatipes (Moore, 1881)
- クサシロキヨトウ — Mythimna loreyi (Duponchel, 1827)
- ミヤマフタオビキヨトウ — Mythimna matsumuriana (Bryk, 1949)
- スジグロキヨトウ — Mythimna nigrilinea (Leech, [1889])
- ノヒラキヨトウ — Mythimna obsoleta (Hübner, [1803])
- ヤエヤマナカオビキヨトウ — Mythimna opada (Calora, 1966)
- タンポキヨトウ — Mythimna pallens (Linnaeus, 1758)
- マエジロアカフキヨトウ — Mythimna pallidicosta (Hampson, 1894)
- ブンゴキヨトウ — Mythimna percussa (Butler, 1880)
- クロシタキヨトウ — Mythimna placida Butler, 1878
- ニセスジシロキヨトウ — Mythimna polysticha (Turner, 1902)
- アカスジキヨトウ — Mythimna postica (Hampson, 1905)
- ウスベニキヨトウ — Mythimna pudorina subrosea (Matsumura, 1926)
- フタテンキヨトウ — Mythimna radiata (Bremer, 1861)
- アカバキヨトウ — Mythimna rufipennis Butler, 1878
- カバフクロテンキヨトウ — Mythimna salebrosa (Butler, 1878)
- アワヨトウ — Mythimna separata (Walker, 1865)
- リュウキュウアカスジキヨトウ — Mythimna simillima (Walker, 1862)
- ツマグロキヨトウ — Mythimna simplex japonica Yoshimatsu, 1994
- 和名未定 — Mythimna snelleni Hreblay, [1997]
- ヒメクサシロキヨトウ — Mythimna stenographa (Lower, 1900)
- マメチャイロキヨトウ — Mythimna stolida (Leech, [1889])
- スジシロキヨトウ — Mythimna striata (Leech, 1900)
- フタオビキヨトウ — Mythimna turca (Linnaeus, 1761)
- クニガミキヨトウ — Mythimna uruma Sugi, 1970
- ユーウスイロキヨトウ — Mythimna yu (Guenée, 1852)
- ヌカビラネジロキリガ — Brachylomia viminalis (Fabricius, 1777)
- ホソバオビキリガ — Dryobotodes angusta Sugi, 1980
- ナカオビキリガ — Dryobotodes intermissa (Butler, 1886)
- プライヤオビキリガ — Dryobotodes pryeri (Leech, 1900)
- オガサワラヒゲヨトウ — Dasypolia fani Staudinger, 1892
- ヒロバモクメキリガ — Xylena changi Horie, 1993
- キバラモクメキリガ — Xylena formosa (Butler, 1878)
- アヤモクメキリガ — Xylena fumosa (Butler, 1878)
- ハネナガモクメキリガ — Xylena nihonica Höne, 1917
- シロスジキリガ — Lithomoia solidaginis (Hübner, [1803])
- シロクビキリガ — Lithophane consocia (Borkhausen, 1792)
- クモガタキリガ — Lithophane lamda (Fabricius, 1787)
- コケイロホソキリガ — Lithophane nagaii Sugi, 1958
- モンハイイロキリガ — Lithophane plumbealis (Matsumura, 1926)
- カシワキボシキリガ — Lithophane pruinosa (Butler, 1878)
- アメイロホソキリガ — Lithophane remota Hreblay & Ronkay, 1998
- カタハリキリガ — Lithophane rosinae (Püngeler, 1906)
- ナカグロホソキリガ — Lithophane socia (Hufnagel, 1766)
- ハンノキリガ — Lithophane ustulata (Butler, 1878)
- ウスアオキリガ — Lithophane venusta (Leech, [1889])
- サヌキキリガ — Elwesia sugii Yoshimoto, 1994
- カバイロミツボシキリガ — Eupsilia boursini Sugi, 1958
- ウスミミモンキリガ — Eupsilia contracta (Butler, 1878)
- ヒダカミツボシキリガ — Eupsilia hidakaensis Sugi, 1987
- ヨスジノコメキリガ — Eupsilia quadrilinea (Leech, [1889])
- ヨスジキリガ — Eupsilia strigifera Butler, 1879
- エゾミツボシキリガ — Eupsilia transversa (Hufnagel, 1766)
- ミツボシキリガ — Eupsilia tripunctata Butler, 1878
- ムラサキミツボシキリガ — Eupsilia unipuncta Scriba, 1919
- クロチャマダラキリガ — Rhynchaglaea fuscipennis Sugi, 1958
- チャマダラキリガ — Rhynchaglaea scitula (Butler, 1879)
- ヤクシマキリガ — Mesorhynchaglaea pacifica Sugi, 1980
- キマエキリガ — Hemiglaea costalis (Butler, 1879)
- エグリキリガ — Teratoglaea pacifica Sugi, 1958
- スミレモンキリガ — Sugitania akirai Sugi, 1990
- ヤマノモンキリガ — Sugitania clara Sugi, 1990
- スギタニモンキリガ — Sugitania lepida (Butler, 1879)
- フサヒゲオビキリガ — Agrochola evelina (Butler, 1879)
- イセキリガ — Agrochola sakabei Sugi, 1980
- ツチイロキリガ — Agrochola vulpecula (Lederer, 1853)
- ホシオビキリガ — Conistra albipuncta (Leech, 1889)
- カシワオビキリガ — Conistra ardescens (Butler, 1879)
- ゴマダラキリガ — Conistra castaneofasciata (Motschulsky, 1861)
- テンスジキリガ — Conistra fletcheri Sugi, 1958
- ミヤマオビキリガ — Conistra grisescens Draudt, 1950
- ナワキリガ — Conistra nawae Matsumura, 1926
- イチゴキリガ — Orbona fragariae pallidior Warren, 1910
- モンキキリガ — Xanthia icteritia (Hufnagel, 1766)
- キイロキリガ — Xanthia togata (Esper, 1788)
- オオモンキキリガ — Xanthia tunicata Graeser, 1889
- エゾキイロキリガ — Tiliacea japonago (Wileman & West, 1929)
- ミスジキリガ — Jodia sericea (Butler, 1878)
- ウスキトガリキリガ — Telorta acuminata (Butler, 1878)
- ノコメトガリキリガ — Telorta divergens (Butler, 1879)
- キトガリキリガ — Telorta edentata (Leech, [1889])
- アオバハガタヨトウ — Antivaleria viridimacula (Graeser, 1889)
- ヘーネアオハガタヨトウ — Nyctycia hoenei (Boursin, 1958)
- ヤマトハガタヨトウ — Nyctycia stenoptera (Sugi, 1959)
- ヒマラヤハガタヨトウ — Nyctycia strigidisca owadai (Yoshimoto, 1988)
- ムラサキハガタヨトウ本州以南亜種 — Blepharita amica amica (Treitschke, 1825)
- ムラサキハガタヨトウ北海道亜種 — Blepharita amica ussuriensis Sheljuzhko, 1919
- ミヤマハガタヨトウ — Mniotype bathensis (Lutzau, 1901)
- オオハガタヨトウ — Mniotype melanodonta (Hampson, 1906)
- ハイイロハガタヨトウ — Meganephria cinerea (Butler, 1881)
- ミドリハガタヨトウ — Meganephria extensa (Butler, 1879)
- ホソバハガタヨトウ — Meganephria funesta (Leech, [1889])
- クロビロードヨトウ — Sidemia bremeri (Erschoff, 1867)
- コケイロビロードヨトウ — Sidemia spilogramma (Rambur, 1871)
- キタノハマヨトウ — Apamea anceps maritima Sugi, 1994
- アカモクメヨトウ — Apamea aquila oriens (Warren, 1911)
- ヒメハガタヨトウ — Apamea commixta (Butler, 1881)
- カドモンヨトウ — Apamea crenata (Hufnagel, 1766)
- ネスジシラクモヨトウ — Apamea hampsoni Sugi, 1963
- オオアカヨトウ — Apamea lateritia (Hufnagel, 1766)
- ユーラシアオホーツクヨトウ — Apamea monoglypha (Hufnagel, 1766)
- イシカリヨトウ — Apamea oblonga (Haworth, 1809)
- オンタケクロヨトウ — Apamea ontakensis Sugi, 1982
- マツバラシラクモヨトウ — Apamea remissa (Hübner, [1809])
- アルプスクロヨトウ — Apamea rubrirena pacifica Sugi, 1982
- セスジヨトウ — Apamea scolopacina subbrunnea (Warren, 1911)
- チャイロカドモンヨトウ — Apamea sodalis (Butler, 1878)
- シロミミハイイロヨトウ — Apamea sordens basistriga (Staudinger, 1892)
- スジアカヨトウ — Apamea striata Haruta, 1958
- エゾヘリグロヨトウ — Apamea veterina haelsseni (Graeser, 1889)
- イイデクロヨトウ — Apamea wasedana Sugi, 1982
- ウスクモヨトウ — Eremobina pabulatricula fraudulenta (Staudinger, 1888)
- コマエアカシロヨトウ — Leucapamea askoldis (Oberthür, 1880)
- クロコシロヨトウ — Leucapamea hikosana (Sugi, 1958)
- マエアカシロヨトウ — Leucapamea kawadai (Sugi, 1955)
- キュウシュウマエアカシロヨトウ — Leucapamea kyushuensis (Sugi, 1958)
- アオフシラクモヨトウ — Antapamea conciliata (Butler, 1878)
- オキナワシラクモヨトウ — Antapamea okinawensis (Sugi, 1968)
- セアカヨトウ — Oligia fodinae (Oberthür, 1880)
- シロミミチビヨトウ — Oligia leuconephra Hampson, 1908
- クサビヨトウ — Oligia ophiogramma (Esper, 1794)
- ウスキモンヨトウ — Photedes fluxa rufata (Kardakoff, 1928)
- ヨコスジヨトウ — Mesoligia furuncula ([Denis & Schiffermüller], 1775)
- ハイイロヨトウ — Parastichtis suspecta (Hübner, [1817])
- ホシミミヨトウ — Mesapamea concinnata Heinicke, 1959
- ミヤマチャイロヨトウ北海道亜種 — Mesapamea hedeni hedeni (Graeser, [1889])
- ミヤマチャイロヨトウ本州以南亜種 — Mesapamea hedeni takanensis (Marumo, 1932)
- サッポロチャイロヨトウ — Sapporia repetita (Butler, 1885)
- マダラヨトウ — Xenapamea pacifica Sugi, 1970
- ヒコサンコアカヨトウ — Anapamea apameoides (Draudt, 1950)
- カバマダラヨトウ — Anapamea cuneatoides Poole, 1989
- ヒメキイロヨトウ — Anapamea incerta (Staudinger, 1892)
- ハジマヨトウ — Bambusiphila vulgaris (Butler, 1886)
- ナカグロアカガネヨトウ — Atrachea japonica (Leech, [1889])
- ミヤケジマヨトウ伊豆諸島以外亜種 — Atrachea miyakensis contaminata Sugi, 1982
- ミヤケジマヨトウ伊豆諸島亜種 — Atrachea miyakensis miyakensis Sugi, 1963
- ギシギシヨトウ — Atrachea nitens (Butler, 1878)
- イチモジヒメヨトウ — Xylomoia fusei Sugi, 1976
- クシロモクメヨトウ — Xylomoia graminea (Graeser, 1889)
- コンゴウミドリヨトウ — Staurophora celsia (Linnaeus, 1758)
- フキヨトウ — Hydraecia amurensis Staudinger, 1892
- スギキタヨトウ — Hydraecia mongoliensis Urbahn, 1967
- キタヨトウ — Hydraecia ultima Holst, 1965
- タカネショウブヨトウ — Amphipoea asiatica (Burrows, 1912)
- ミヤマショウブヨトウ — Amphipoea burrowsi (Chapman, 1912)
- キタショウブヨトウ — Amphipoea fucosa (Freyer, 1830)
- エゾショウブヨトウ — Amphipoea lucens (Freyer, 1845)
- ショウブヨトウ — Amphipoea ussuriensis (Petersen, 1914)
- ショウブオオヨトウ — Celaena leucostigma (Hübner, [1808])
- ヒメトガリヨトウ — Gortyna basalipunctata Graeser, 1889
- ゴボウトガリヨトウ — Gortyna fortis (Butler, 1878)
- オオチャバネヨトウ — Nonagria puengeleri (Schawerda, 1923)
- ガマヨトウ — Archanara aerata (Butler, 1878)
- ハガタウスキヨトウ — Archanara resoluta Hampson, 1910
- キスジウスキヨトウ — Archanara sparganii (Esper, 1790)
- テンスジウスキヨトウ — Coenobia orientalis Sugi, 1982
- ヌマベウスキヨトウ — Chilodes pacificus Sugi, 1982
- キュウシュウスジヨトウ — Doerriesa coenosa Sugi, 1982
- エゾスジヨトウ — Doerriesa striata (Staudinger, 1900)
- ヨシヨトウ — Rhizedra lutosa griseata Warren, 1911
- スジグロウスキヨトウ — Chortodes brevilineus (Fenn, 1864)
- ホソバウスキヨトウ — Chortodes elymi (Treitschke, 1825)
- クシヒゲウスキヨトウ — Ctenostola sparganoides (Bang-Haas, 1927)
- テンモントガリヨトウ — Sedina buettneri moltrechti (Bang-Haas, 1927)
- チビウスキヨトウ — Sesamia azumai (Sugi, 1970)
- カバイロウスキヨトウ — Sesamia confusa (Sugi, 1982)
- イネヨトウ — Sesamia inferens (Walker, 1856)
- テンオビヨトウ — Sesamia turpis (Butler, 1879)
- クマソオオヨトウ — Kumasia kumaso (Sugi, 1963)
- エチゴハガタヨトウ伊豆諸島以外亜種 — Asidemia inexpecta inexpecta (Sugi, 1963)
- エチゴハガタヨトウ伊豆諸島亜種 — Asidemia inexpecta insulicola (Sugi, 1963)
- ウスキシタヨトウ — Triphaenopsis cinerescens Butler, 1885
- エゾキシタヨトウ — Triphaenopsis jezoensis Sugi, 1962
- シロホシキシタヨトウ — Triphaenopsis lucilla Butler, 1878
- ナカジロキシタヨトウ — Triphaenopsis postflava (Leech, 1900)
- ツシマキシタヨトウ — Olivenebula oberthueri (Staudinger, 1892)
- ウスアオヨトウ — Polyphaenis subviridis (Butler, 1878)
- コマルバヨトウ — Hemictenophora euplexiodes euplexiodes Sugi, 1970
- ソトシロフヨトウ — Colocasidia albifera Sugi, 1982
- トビイロアカガネヨトウ — Euplexia albilineola (Wileman & South, 1918)
- ムラサキアカガネヨトウ — Euplexia koreaeplexia Bryk, 1949
- アカガネヨトウ — Euplexia lucipara (Linnaeus, 1758)
- ホソバミドリヨトウ — Euplexidia angusta Yoshimoto, 1987
- マエグロシラオビアカガネヨトウ — Phlogophora albovittata (Moore, 1867)
- モンキアカガネヨトウ — Phlogophora aureopuncta (Hampson, 1908)
- キグチヨトウ — Phlogophora beatrix Butler, 1878
- シラオビアカガネヨトウ — Phlogophora illustrata (Graeser, [1889])
- コゴマヨトウ — Chandata bella (Butler, 1881)
- シロモンアカガネヨトウ — Valeria dilutiapicana splendida (Sugi, 1958)
- シロフアオヨトウ — Xenotrachea niphonica Kishida & Yoshimoto, 1979
- カラフトシロスジヨトウ — Hyppa rectilinea (Esper, 1788)
- セブトモクメヨトウ — Auchmis saga (Butler, 1878)
- コモクメヨトウ — Actinotia intermediata (Bremer, 1861)
- ヒメモクメヨトウ — Actinotia polyodon (Clerck, 1759)
- スジクロモクメヨトウ — Dypterygia andreji Kardakoff, 1928
- クロモクメヨトウ — Dypterygia caliginosa (Walker, 1858)
- モクメヨトウ — Axylia putris (Linnaeus, 1761)
- ミヨタトラヨトウ — Oxytrypia orbiculosa ussurica Schawerda, 1923
- シロスジアオヨトウ — Trachea atriplicis gnoma (Butler, 1878)
- ヒメシロテンアオヨトウ — Trachea melanospila Kollar, [1844]
- オオシロテンアオヨトウ — Trachea punkikonis lucilla Sugi, 1982
- ハガタアオヨトウ — Trachea tokiensis (Butler, 1884)
- ミツボシヨトウ — Feliniopsis indistans (Guenée, 1852)
- カラカネヨトウ屋久島以北亜種 — Karana hoenei hoenei (Bang-Haas, 1927)
- カラカネヨトウ奄美以南亜種 — Karana hoenei inornata Sugi, 1991
- アオアカガネヨトウ — Karana laetevirens (Oberthür, 1884)
- ウスクロモクメヨトウ — Dipterygina cupreotincta Sugi, 1954
- コクロモクメヨトウ — Dipterygina japonica (Leech, [1889])
- ホソバヨトウ — Sasunaga longiplaga Warren, 1912
- ヨスジアカヨトウ — Pygopteryx suava Staudinger, 1887
- キイロトガリヨトウ — Brachyxanthia zelotypa (Lederer, 1853)
- クシナシスジキリヨトウ — Spodoptera cilium Guenée, 1852
- スジキリヨトウ — Spodoptera depravata (Butler, 1879)
- アフリカシロナヨトウ — Spodoptera exempta (Walker, 1857)
- シロイチモジヨトウ — Spodoptera exigua (Hübner, [1808])
- ハスモンヨトウ — Spodoptera litura (Fabricius, 1775)
- シロナヨトウ — Spodoptera mauritia acronyctoides Guenée, 1852
- クシヒゲスジキリヨトウ — Spodoptera pecten Guenée, 1852
- アカマダラヨトウ — Spodoptera picta (Guérin-Méneville, 1838)
- シロテンウスグロヨトウ — Athetis albisignata (Oberthür, 1879)
- クロテンヨトウ — Athetis cinerascens (Motschulsky, 1861)
- エゾウスイロヨトウ — Athetis correpta (Püngeler, 1907)
- ミツボシモンオビヨトウ — Athetis costiloba Sugi, 1982
- テンウスイロヨトウ — Athetis dissimilis (Hampson, 1909)
- ウスグロヨトウ — Athetis funesta (Staudinger, 1888)
- オビウスイロヨトウ — Athetis furvula lentina (Staudinger, 1888)
- ヒメオビウスイロヨトウ — Athetis gluteosa (Treitschke, 1835)
- ヒメウスグロヨトウ — Athetis lapidea Wileman, 1911
- コウスイロヨトウ — Athetis lepigone (Möschler, 1860)
- シロモンオビヨトウ — Athetis lineosa (Moore, 1881)
- ヒメシロモンオビヨトウ — Athetis lineosella Sugi, 1982
- キバネシロテンウスグロヨトウ — Athetis pallidipennis Sugi, 1982
- リュウキュウウスイロヨトウ — Athetis placida (Moore, 1884)
- ヒメサビスジヨトウ — Athetis stellata (Moore, 1882)
- スジウスイロヨトウ — Athetis striolata (Butler, 1886)
- オスキバネヨトウ — Athetis thoracica (Moore, 1884)
- フタホシヨトウ — Hoplodrina euryptera Boursin, 1937
- ウグイスセダカヨトウ — Mormo cyanea Sugi, 1982
- アオバセダカヨトウ — Mormo muscivirens Butler, 1878
- ノコメセダカヨトウ — Orthogonia sera Felder & Felder, 1862
- アマミノコメセダカヨトウ — Orthogonia sugii Seino, 1992
- ツクシカラスヨトウ — Callyna contracta Warren, 1913
- アコウツマジロヨトウ — Callyna monoleuca Walker, 1858
- ハイイロモクメヨトウ — Antha grata (Butler, 1881)
- ハグルマヨトウ — Apsarasa radians (Westwood, 1848)
- フタスジキリガ — Enargia flavata Wileman & West, 1930
- ウスシタキリガ — Enargia paleacea (Esper, 1788)
- シマキリガ — Cosmia achatina Butler, 1879
- ニレキリガ — Cosmia affinis (Linnaeus, 1767)
- シラオビキリガ — Cosmia camptostigma (Ménétriès, 1859)
- ミカヅキキリガ — Cosmia cara (Butler, 1881)
- ツマグロキリガ — Cosmia inconspicua (Draudt, 1950)
- ミチノクキリガ — Cosmia mali Sugi, 1982
- キシタキリガ — Cosmia moderata (Staudinger, 1888)
- ナシキリガ — Cosmia pyralina ([Denis & Schiffermüller], 1775)
- シラホシキリガ — Cosmia restituta picta (Staudinger, 1888)
- ヒイロキリガ — Cosmia sanguinea Sugi, 1955
- ヒメミカヅキキリガ — Cosmia spurcopyga trapezinula (Filipjev, 1927)
- イタヤキリガ — Cosmia trapezina exigua (Butler, 1881)
- ミヤマキリガ — Cosmia unicolor (Staudinger, 1892)
- ヤンコウスキーキリガ — Xanthocosmia jankowskii (Oberthür, 1884)
- マダラキボシキリガ — Dimorphicosmia variegata (Oberthür, 1879)
- ヤナギキリガ — Ipimorpha retusa (Linnaeus, 1761)
- ドロキリガ — Ipimorpha subtusa ([Denis & Schiffermüller], 1775)
- アイノクロハナギンガ — Chasminodes aino Sugi, 1956
- ハルタギンガ — Chasminodes albonitens (Bremer, 1861)
- エゾクロギンガ — Chasminodes atratus (Butler, 1884)
- ニセハルタギンガ — Chasminodes bremeri Sugi & Kononenko, 1981
- ウススジギンガ — Chasminodes cilia (Staudinger, 1888)
- ヤマトギンガ — Chasminodes japonicus Sugi, 1955
- ウラギンガ — Chasminodes nervosus (Butler, 1881)
- ヒロオビクロギンガ — Chasminodes nigrilineus (Leech, [1889])
- ムジギンガ — Chasminodes pseudalbonitens Sugi, 1955
- クロハナギンガ — Chasminodes sugii Kononenko, 1981
- ヒメギンガ — Chasminodes unipunctus Sugi, 1955
- ネグロヨトウ — Chytonix albonotata (Staudinger, 1892)
- ホソバネグロヨトウ — Chytonix subalbonotata Sugi, 1959
- チャオビヨトウ — Niphonyx segregata (Butler, 1878)
- ベニモンヨトウ — Oligonyx vulnerata (Butler, 1878)
- マエホシヨトウ — Pyrrhidivalva sordida (Butler, 1881)
- ヒトテンヨトウ — Chalconyx ypsilon (Butler, 1879)
- マダラムラサキヨトウ — Eucarta amethystina (Hübner, [1803])
- ウスグロシマヨトウ — Eucarta arcta (Lederer, 1853)
- ヒメシマヨトウ — Eucarta arctides (Staudinger, 1888)
- シマヨトウ — Eucarta fasciata (Butler, 1878)
- ウスムラサキヨトウ — Eucarta virgo (Treitschke, 1835)
- マルシロホシヒメヨトウ — Dysmilichia fukudai Sugi, 1963
- モンオビヒメヨトウ — Dysmilichia gemella (Leech, [1889])
- フタテンヒメヨトウ — Hadjina biguttula (Motschulsky, 1866)
- サビイロヒメヨトウ — Hadjina chinensis (Wallengren, 1860)
- シロマダラヒメヨトウ — Iambia japonica Sugi, 1958
- アミメヒメヨトウ — Iambia transversa (Moore, 1882)
- キクビヒメヨトウ — Prometopus flavicollis (Leech, [1889])
- ニセトガリヨトウ — Virgo confusa Kishida & Yoshimoto, 1991
- トガリヨトウ — Virgo datanidia (Butler, 1885)
- ナナメヒメヨトウ — Balsa leodura (Staudinger, 1887)
- ギンモンアカヨトウ — Plusilla rosalia Staudinger, 1892
- ハマオモトヨトウ — Brithys crini crini (Fabricius, 1775)
- オオクロバヤガ — Euxoa adumbrata (Eversmann, 1842)
- ムギヤガ — Euxoa karschi (Graeser, 1889)
- クロヤガ — Euxoa nigrata Matsumura, 1925
- クモマウスグロヤガ — Euxoa ochrogaster rossica (Staudinger, 1881)
- ウスグロヤガ — Euxoa sibirica (Boisduval, 1832)
- ポロシリモンヤガ — Protexarnis balanistis (Grote, 1873)
- センモンヤガ — Agrotis exclamationis informis Leech, [1889]
- タマナヤガ — Agrotis ipsilon (Hufnagel, 1766)
- フルショウヤガ — Agrotis militaris Staudinger, 1888
- ハマヤガ — Agrotis ripae albovenosa Tschetverikow, 1925
- ホッキョクモンヤガ — Agrotis ruta Eversmann, 1851
- マエグロヤガ — Agrotis scotacra (Filipjev, 1927)
- カブラヤガ — Agrotis segetum ([Denis & Schiffermüller], 1775)
- ベルイマンヤガ — Agrotis stenibergmani (Bryk, 1941)
- オオカブラヤガ — Agrotis tokionis Butler, 1881
- アトウスヤガ — Actebia fennica (Tauscher, 1806)
- ホソアオバヤガ — Actebia praecox flavomaculata (Graeser, [1889])
- オオホソアオバヤガ — Actebia praecurrens (Staudinger, 1888)
- コキマエヤガ — Albocosta triangularis (Moore, 1867)
- マエジロヤガ — Ochropleura plecta glaucimacula (Graeser, 1889)
- ナカトビヤガ — Chersotis cuprea japonica (Warnecke, 1940)
- ヒメカクモンヤガ — Chersotis deplanata (Eversmann, 1843)
- ホシボシヤガ — Hermonassa arenosa (Butler, 1881)
- クロクモヤガ — Hermonassa cecilia Butler, 1878
- シロオビハイイロヤガ — Spaelotis lucens Butler, 1881
- アカマエヤガ — Spaelotis nipona (Felder & Rogenhofer, 1874)
- ヒメアカマエヤガ — Spaelotis ravida ([Denis & Schiffermüller], 1775)
- キタウスグロヤガ — Spaelotis suecica (Aurivillius, 1890)
- 和名未定 — Graphiphora augur (Fabricius, 1781)
- キタミモンヤガ — Pseudohermonassa melancholica (Lederer, 1853)
- マエウスヤガ — Eugraphe sigma ([Denis & Schiffermüller], 1775)
- ノコスジモンヤガ — Coenophila subrosea (Stephens, 1829)
- ウスイロカバスジヤガ — Sineugraphe bipartita (Graeser, [1889])
- カバスジヤガ — Sineugraphe exusta (Butler, 1878)
- オオカバスジヤガ — Sineugraphe oceanica (Kardakoff, 1928)
- ナカオビチャイロヤガ — Paradiarsia punicea (Hübner, [1803])
- クシヒゲモンヤガ — Lycophotia cissigma (Ménétriès, 1859)
- エゾクシヒゲモンヤガ — Lycophotia velata (Staudinger, 1888)
- ニセタマナヤガ — Peridroma saucia (Hübner, [1808])
- ウスアカヤガ — Diarsia albipennis (Butler, 1889)
- ミヤマアカヤガ — Diarsia brunnea ([Denis & Schiffermüller], 1775)
- オオバコヤガ — Diarsia canescens (Butler, 1878)
- エゾオオバコヤガ — Diarsia dahlii (Hübner, [1813])
- コウスチャヤガ — Diarsia deparca (Butler, 1879)
- モンキヤガ — Diarsia dewitzi (Graeser, 1889)
- ヤマトウスチャヤガ — Diarsia nipponica Ogata, 1957
- アカフヤガ — Diarsia pacifica Boursin, 1943
- ウスイロアカフヤガ — Diarsia ruficauda (Warren, 1909)
- ダイセツヤガ — Xestia albuncula (Eversmann, 1851)
- シロモンヤガ — Xestia c-nigrum (Linnaeus, 1758)
- アサマウスモンヤガ — Xestia descripta (Bremer, 1861)
- ウスチャヤガ — Xestia dilatata (Butler, 1879)
- タンポヤガ — Xestia ditrapezium orientalis (Strand, 1916)
- キシタミドリヤガ — Xestia efflorescens (Butler, 1879)
- クロフトビイロヤガ — Xestia fuscostigma (Bremer, 1861)
- ハコベヤガ — Xestia kollari plumbata (Butler, 1881)
- ハイイロキシタヤガ — Xestia semiherbida decorata (Butler, 1879)
- アトジロアルプスヤガ — Xestia sincera (Herrich-Schäffer, 1851)
- アルプスヤガ — Xestia speciosa (Hübner, [1813])
- マエキヤガ — Xestia stupenda (Butler, 1878)
- キミミヤガ — Xestia tabida (Butler, 1878)
- ナカグロヤガ — Xestia undosa (Leech, [1889])
- タカネモンヤガ — Xestia wockei tundrana (Bang-Haas, 1912)
- ヤツガダケヤガ — Xestia yatsugadakeana (Matsumura, 1926)
- クロギシギシヤガ — Naenia contaminata (Walker, 1865)
- オオシラホシヤガ — Eurois occulta (Linnaeus, 1758)
- アオバヤガ — Anaplectoides prasinus ([Denis & Schiffermüller], 1775)
- オオアオバヤガ — Anaplectoides virens (Butler, 1878)
- ムラサキウスモンヤガ — Cerastis leucographa ([Denis & Schiffermüller], 1775)
- カギモンヤガ — Cerastis pallescens (Butler, 1878)
- ネムロウスモンヤガ — Cerastis rubricosa ([Denis & Schiffermüller], 1775)
