= Stenograpta =

Scientific classification
- Kingdom: Animalia
- Phylum: Arthropoda
- Clade: Pancrustacea
- Class: Insecta
- Order: Lepidoptera
- Superfamily: Noctuoidea
- Family: Erebidae
- Subfamily: Calpinae
- Genus: Stenograpta; Sugi, 1959
- Species: S. stenoptera

Binomial name
- Stenograpta stenoptera Sugi, 1959

Genus of moths

Stenograpta is a monotypic moth genus of the family Erebidae. Its only species, Stenograpta stenoptera, is found in Japan. Both the genus and species were first described by Shigero Sugi in 1959.
