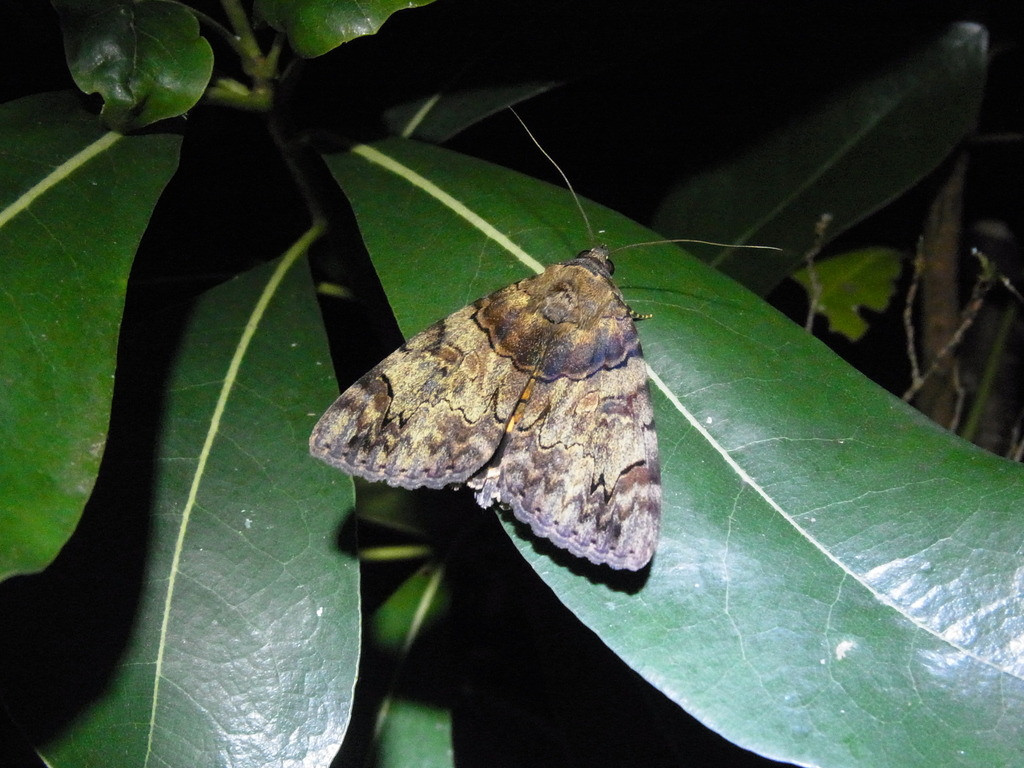

Scientific classification
- Kingdom: Animalia
- Phylum: Arthropoda
- Class: Insecta
- Order: Lepidoptera
- Superfamily: Noctuoidea
- Family: Erebidae
- Genus: Catocala
- Species: C. patala

Binomial name
- Catocala patala Felder & Rogenhofer, 1874

Synonyms
- Catocala volcanica Butler, 1877

= Catocala patala =

Species of moth

Catocala patala is a moth in the family Erebidae first described by Felder and Rogenhofer in 1874. It is found in northern India, China, Korea and Japan (Honshu, Shikoku, Kyushu, Tsushima).
