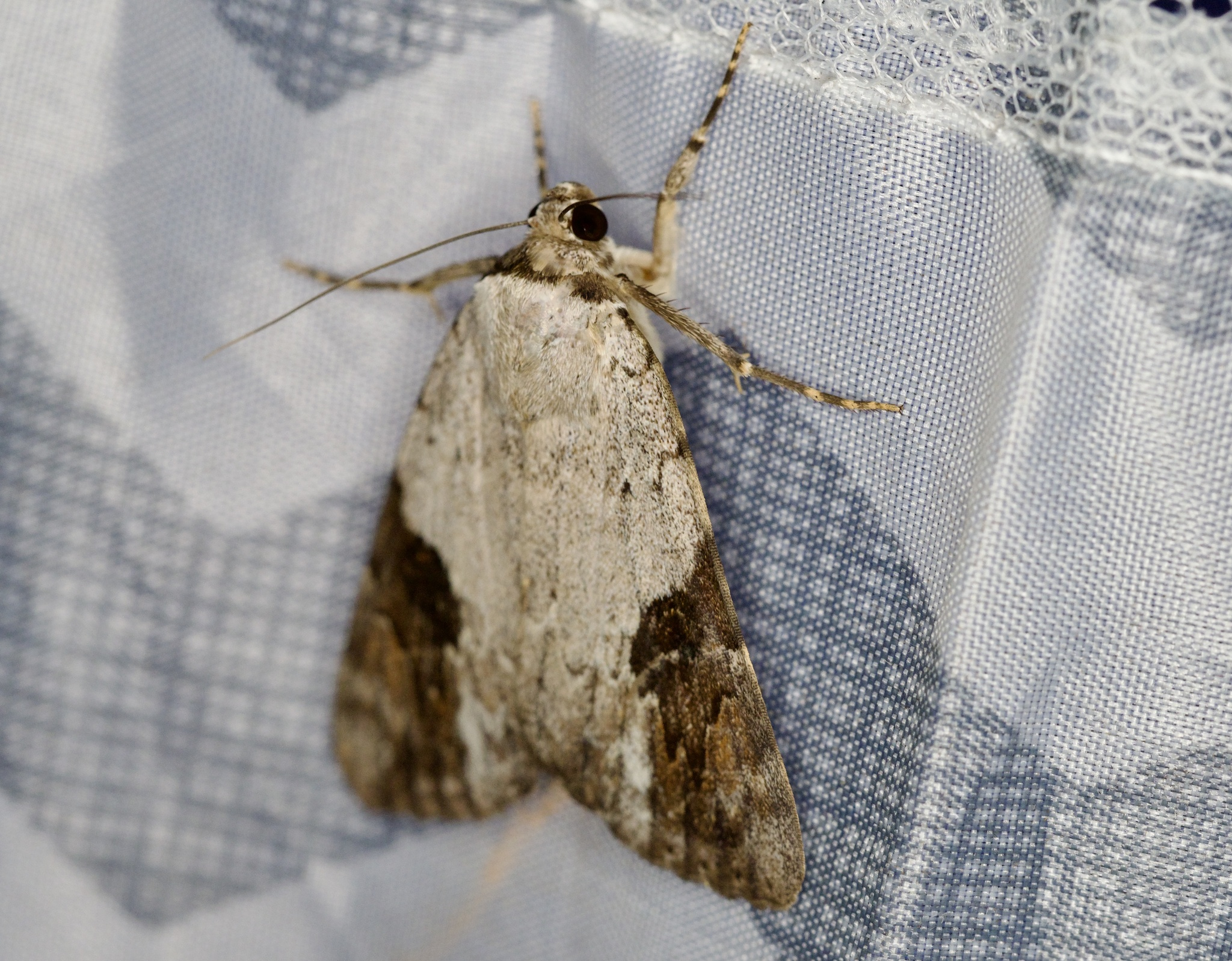

Scientific classification
- Kingdom: Animalia
- Phylum: Arthropoda
- Class: Insecta
- Order: Lepidoptera
- Superfamily: Noctuoidea
- Family: Erebidae
- Genus: Catocala
- Species: C. mirifica

Binomial name
- Catocala mirifica Butler, 1877

= Catocala mirifica =

Species of moth

Catocala mirifica is a species of moth in the family Erebidae that was first described by Arthur Gardiner Butler in 1877. It is found in Japan.
