= Melanaema venata =

Scientific classification
- Domain: Eukaryota
- Kingdom: Animalia
- Phylum: Arthropoda
- Class: Insecta
- Order: Lepidoptera
- Superfamily: Noctuoidea
- Family: Erebidae
- Subfamily: Arctiinae
- Genus: Melanaema
- Species: M. venata

Binomial name
- Melanaema venata Butler, 1877

Synonyms
- Melanaema venata kyushuensis Inoue, 1982; Melanaema venata shikokuensis Inoue, 1982

Species of moth

Melanaema venata is a moth in the family Erebidae. It was described by Arthur Gardiner Butler in 1877. It is found in the Russian Far East (Middle Amur, Primorye, Sakhalin, Kunashir, Shikotan), China (Heilongjiang, Liaonin, Jiangxi), Korea and Japan.
