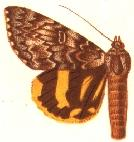

Scientific classification
- Kingdom: Animalia
- Phylum: Arthropoda
- Class: Insecta
- Order: Lepidoptera
- Superfamily: Noctuoidea
- Family: Erebidae
- Genus: Catocala
- Species: C. connexa

Binomial name
- Catocala connexa Butler, 1881

Synonyms
- Ephesia connexa; Catocala rutha Wileman, 1911

= Catocala connexa =

Species of moth

Catocala connexa is a moth of the family Erebidae. It is found in Japan.

The wingspan is 50–57 mm.
