= Amphitrogia =

Scientific classification
- Kingdom: Animalia
- Phylum: Arthropoda
- Class: Insecta
- Order: Lepidoptera
- Superfamily: Noctuoidea
- Family: Noctuidae (?)
- Subfamily: Catocalinae
- Genus: Amphitrogia; Hampson, 1926
- Species: A. amphidecta

Binomial name
- Amphitrogia amphidecta (Butler, 1879)

Genus of moths

Amphitrogia is a monotypic moth genus of the family Noctuidae erected by George Hampson in 1926. Its only species, Amphitrogia amphidecta, was first described by Arthur Gardiner Butler in 1879. The species is found in Japan.
