= Hypostrotia =

Scientific classification
- Kingdom: Animalia
- Phylum: Arthropoda
- Class: Insecta
- Order: Lepidoptera
- Superfamily: Noctuoidea
- Family: Erebidae
- Subfamily: Calpinae
- Genus: Hypostrotia; Hampson, 1926
- Species: H. cinerea

Binomial name
- Hypostrotia cinerea (Butler, 1878)

Synonyms
- Capnodes cinerea Butler, 1878

Genus of moths

Hypostrotia is a monotypic moth genus of the family Erebidae erected by George Hampson in 1926. Its only species, Hypostrotia cinerea, was first described by Arthur Gardiner Butler in 1878. The species is found in Japan, Korea and Russia.
