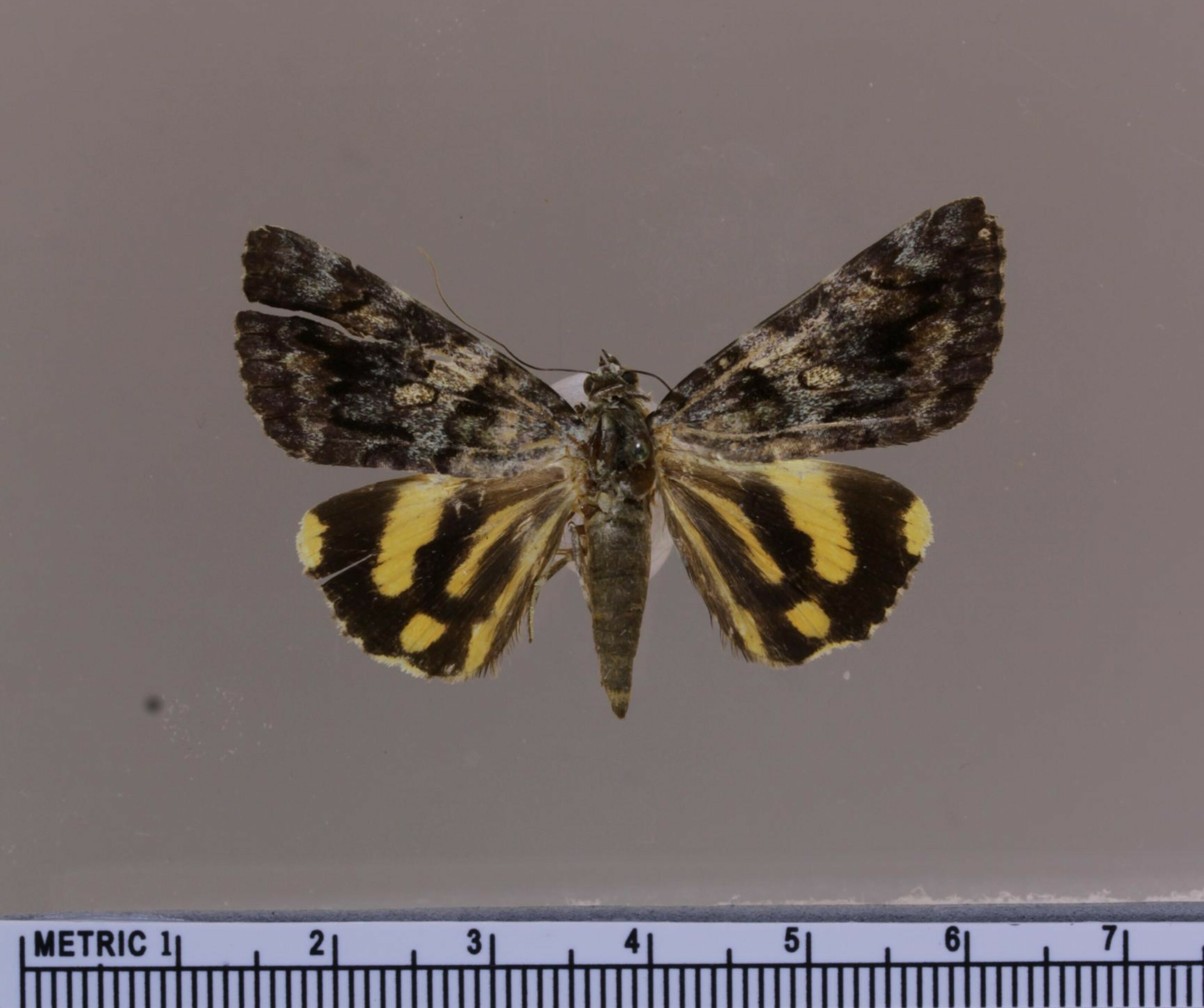

Scientific classification
- Kingdom: Animalia
- Phylum: Arthropoda
- Class: Insecta
- Order: Lepidoptera
- Superfamily: Noctuoidea
- Family: Erebidae
- Genus: Catocala
- Species: C. hyperconnexa

Binomial name
- Catocala hyperconnexa Sugi, 1965

= Catocala hyperconnexa =

Species of moth

Catocala hyperconnexa is a moth in the family Erebidae first described by Shigero Sugi in 1965. It is found in Japan.
