= Catocala jonasii =

Scientific classification
- Kingdom: Animalia
- Phylum: Arthropoda
- Class: Insecta
- Order: Lepidoptera
- Superfamily: Noctuoidea
- Family: Erebidae
- Genus: Catocala
- Species: C. jonasii

Binomial name
- Catocala jonasii Butler, 1877

Species of moth

Catocala jonasii is a moth in the family Erebidae first described by Arthur Gardiner Butler in 1877. It is found in Japan.
