= Draganodes =

Scientific classification
- Kingdom: Animalia
- Phylum: Arthropoda
- Clade: Pancrustacea
- Class: Insecta
- Order: Lepidoptera
- Superfamily: Noctuoidea
- Family: Erebidae
- Subfamily: Calpinae
- Genus: Draganodes; Sugi, 1982
- Species: D. coronata

Binomial name
- Draganodes coronata Sugi, 1982

Genus of moths

Draganodes is a monotypic moth genus of the family Erebidae. Its only species, Draganodes coronata, is found in Japan. Both the genus and the species were first described by Shigero Sugi in 1982.
