= Leiostola =

Scientific classification
- Kingdom: Animalia
- Phylum: Arthropoda
- Class: Insecta
- Order: Lepidoptera
- Superfamily: Noctuoidea
- Family: Erebidae
- Subfamily: Calpinae
- Genus: Leiostola; Hampson, 1926
- Species: L. mollis

Binomial name
- Leiostola mollis (Butler, 1879)

Synonyms
- Poaphila mollis Butler, 1879

Genus of moth

Leiostola is a monotypic moth genus of the family Erebidae erected by George Hampson in 1926. Its only species, Leiostola mollis, was first described by Arthur Gardiner Butler in 1879. It is found in Japan.
