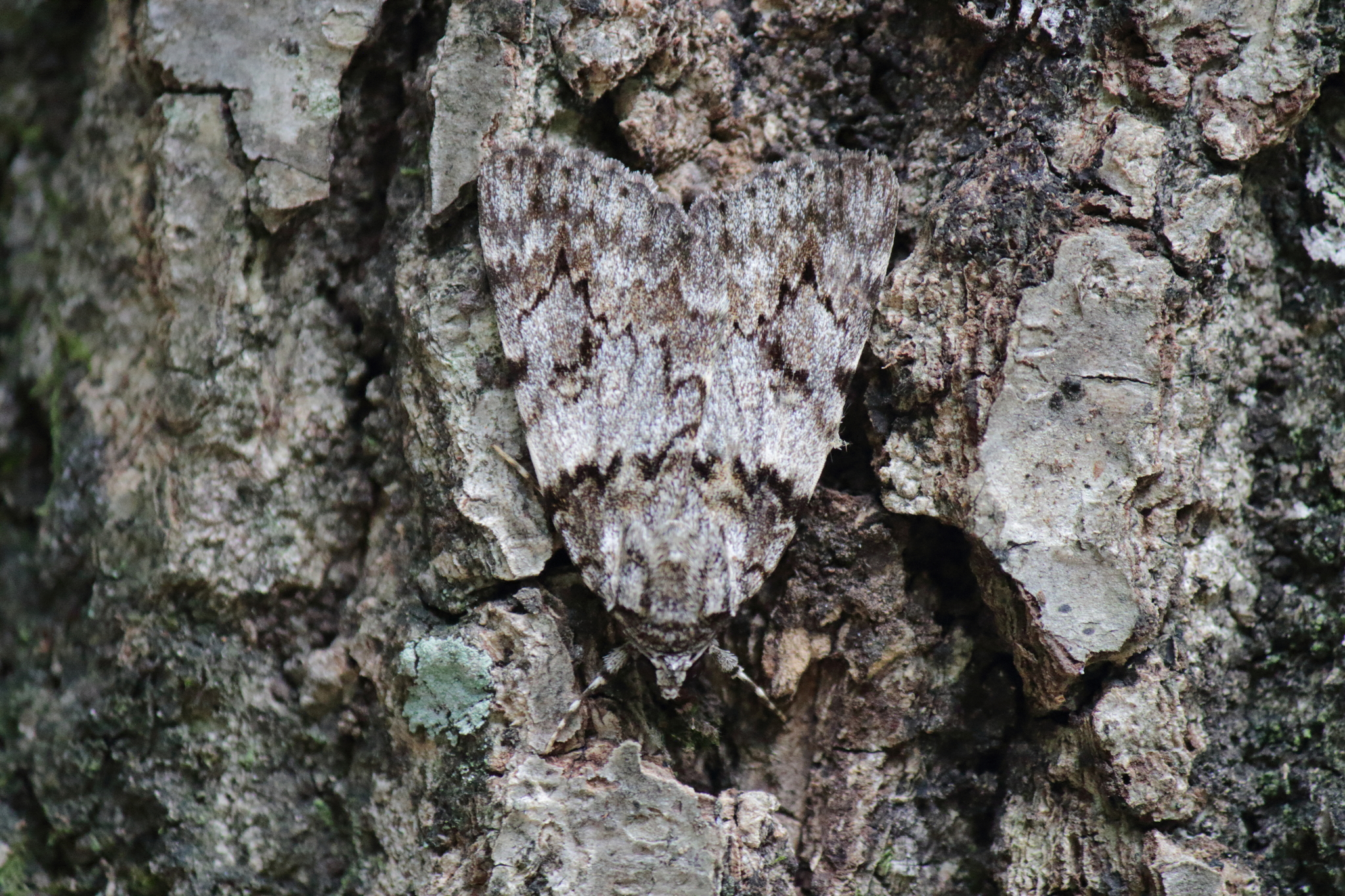
- Catocala duplicata

Scientific classification
- Domain: Eukaryota
- Kingdom: Animalia
- Phylum: Arthropoda
- Class: Insecta
- Order: Lepidoptera
- Superfamily: Noctuoidea
- Family: Erebidae
- Genus: Catocala
- Species: C. duplicata

Binomial name
- Catocala duplicata Butler, 1885

Synonyms
- Catocala suzukii Matsumura 1911

= Catocala duplicata =

Species of moth

Catocala duplicata is a moth of the family Erebidae. It is found in Korea and Japan (Hokkaido, Honshu, Shikoku, and Kyushu).

The wingspan is about 47 mm.
