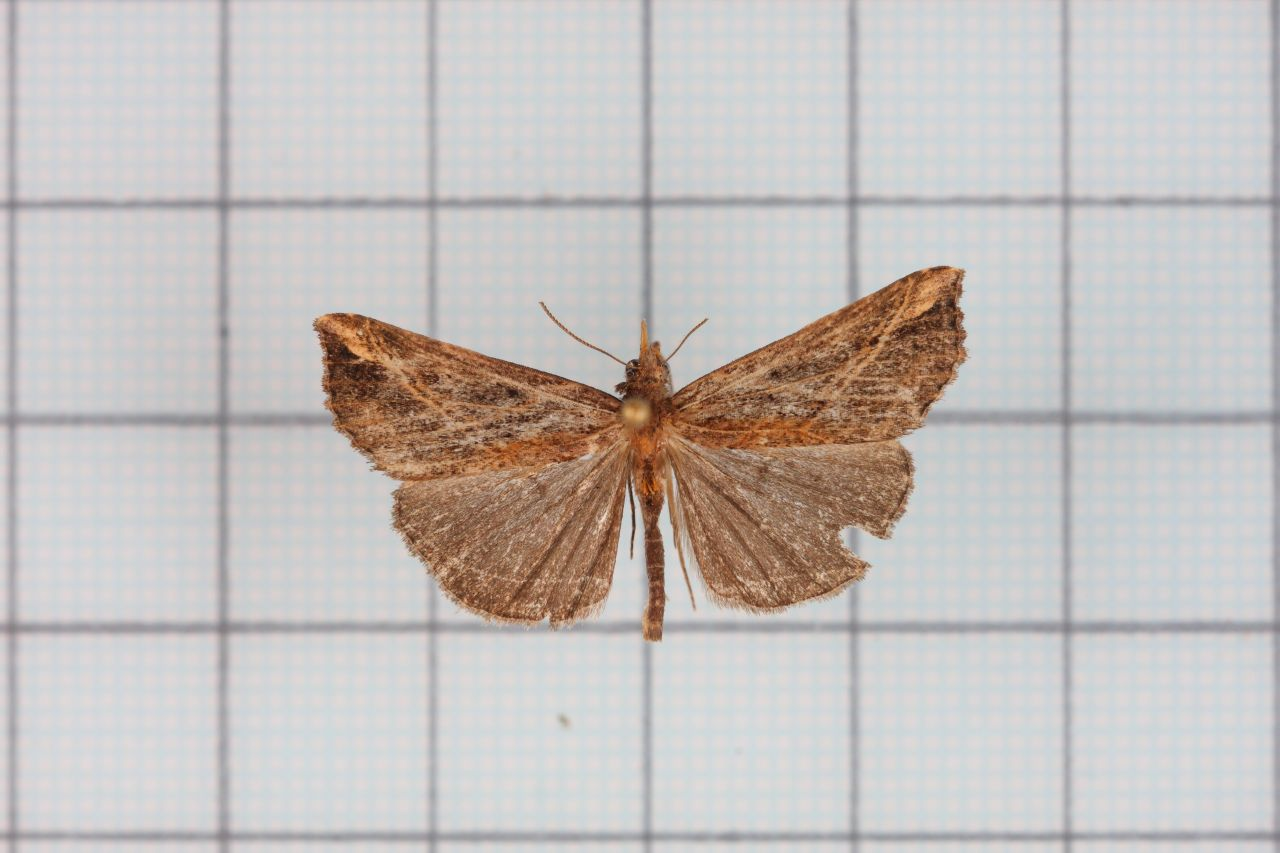

Scientific classification
- Kingdom: Animalia
- Phylum: Arthropoda
- Class: Insecta
- Order: Lepidoptera
- Superfamily: Noctuoidea
- Family: Erebidae
- Genus: Hypena
- Species: H. lignealis

Binomial name
- Hypena lignealis Walker, 1866

= Hypena lignealis =

Species of moth

Hypena lignealis is a moth in the family Noctuidae described by Francis Walker in 1866. It is found in Sri Lanka, Taiwan and Japan.

== Description ==
Its wingspan is about 32 mm. The forewings are much broader. The outer margin less oblique. Raised tufts are slight. Head and thorax reddish brown. Abdomen fuscous. Forewings reddish brown, where the inner area suffused with bluish grey, which is narrowest at middle. Some black spots found in and below cell. There is an indistinct highly angled postmedial line with a black spot on it below cell. The curved apical streak very long and prominent, with two black spots above it. An indistinct submarginal black specks series can be seen. Hindwings fuscous. Ventral side of forewings with black and white subapical speck.
