= Hypena obsoleta =

Scientific classification
- Domain: Eukaryota
- Kingdom: Animalia
- Phylum: Arthropoda
- Class: Insecta
- Order: Lepidoptera
- Superfamily: Noctuoidea
- Family: Erebidae
- Genus: Hypena
- Species: H. obsoleta

Binomial name
- Hypena obsoleta Butler, 1877

Synonyms
- Hypena insignis Butler, 1877; Nesamiptis obsoleta

Species of moth

Hypena obsoleta is a moth of the family Erebidae. It was first described by Arthur Gardiner Butler in 1877. It is endemic to the Hawaiian islands of Kauai, Oahu, Molokai, Maui, Lanai and Hawaii.

It is one of the most variable of all Hawaiian insects.

The larvae feed on Paspalum conjugatum and other grasses in the mountains
