= Hypena extensa =

Scientific classification
- Kingdom: Animalia
- Phylum: Arthropoda
- Class: Insecta
- Order: Lepidoptera
- Superfamily: Noctuoidea
- Family: Erebidae
- Genus: Hypena
- Species: H. extensa

Binomial name
- Hypena extensa Walker, [1866]

Species of moth

Hypena extensa, is a moth of the family Erebidae first described by Francis Walker in 1866. It is found in India and Sri Lanka.
