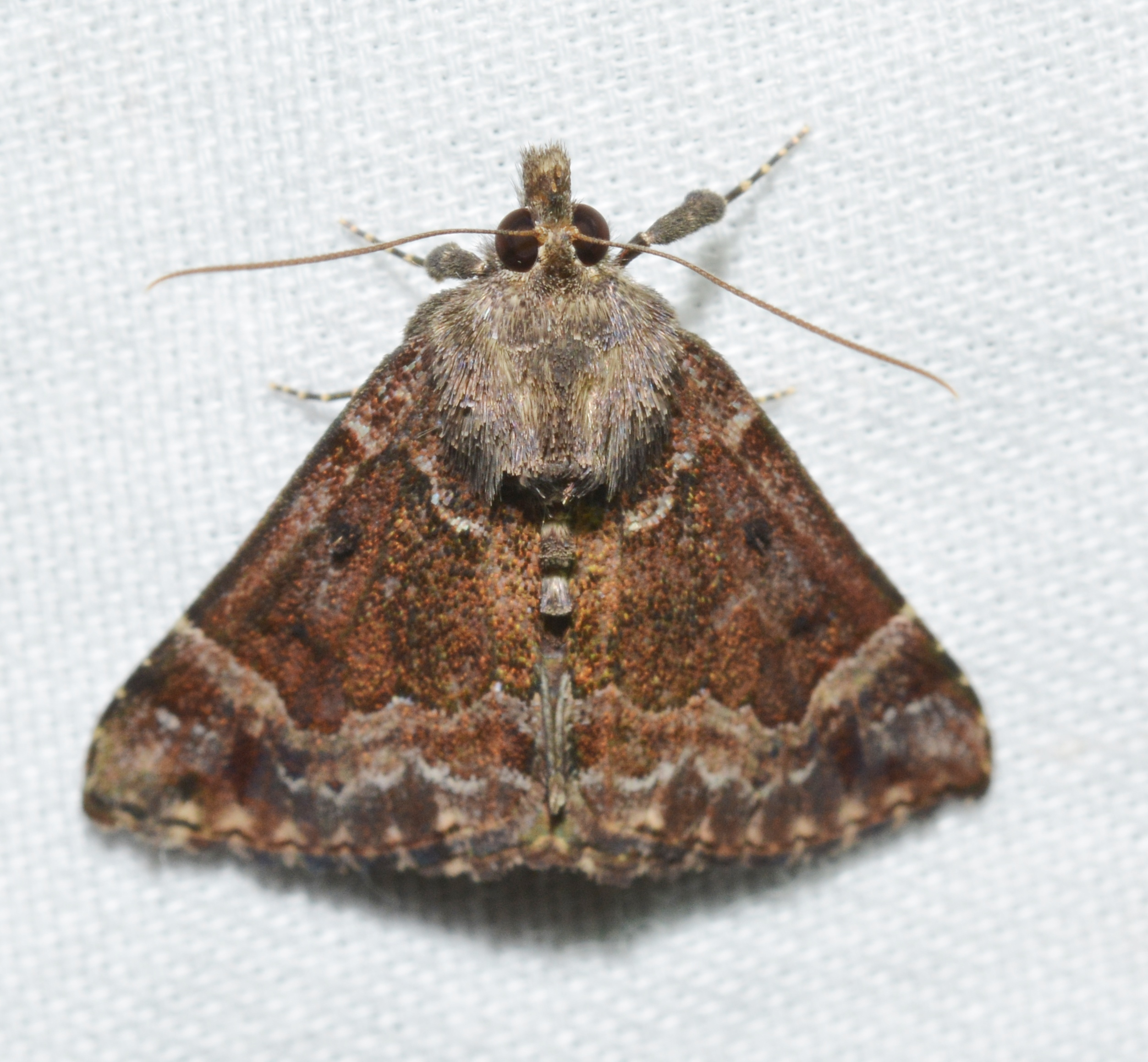

Scientific classification
- Kingdom: Animalia
- Phylum: Arthropoda
- Class: Insecta
- Order: Lepidoptera
- Superfamily: Noctuoidea
- Family: Erebidae
- Genus: Hypena
- Species: H. palparia

Binomial name
- Hypena palparia Walker, 1861

Synonyms
- Bomolocha palparia; Bomolocha scutellaris

= Hypena palparia =

Species of moth

Hypena palparia, the variegated snout-moth or mottled bomolocha, is a moth of the family Erebidae. The species was first described by Francis Walker in 1861. It is found in North America from Nova Scotia west across southern Canada to British Columbia, and south to Alabama and Texas.

The wingspan is 27–33 mm. The moth flies from June to July depending on the location. There are at least two generations over much of east.

The larvae feed on the leaves of Ostrya virginiana and Corylus species.
