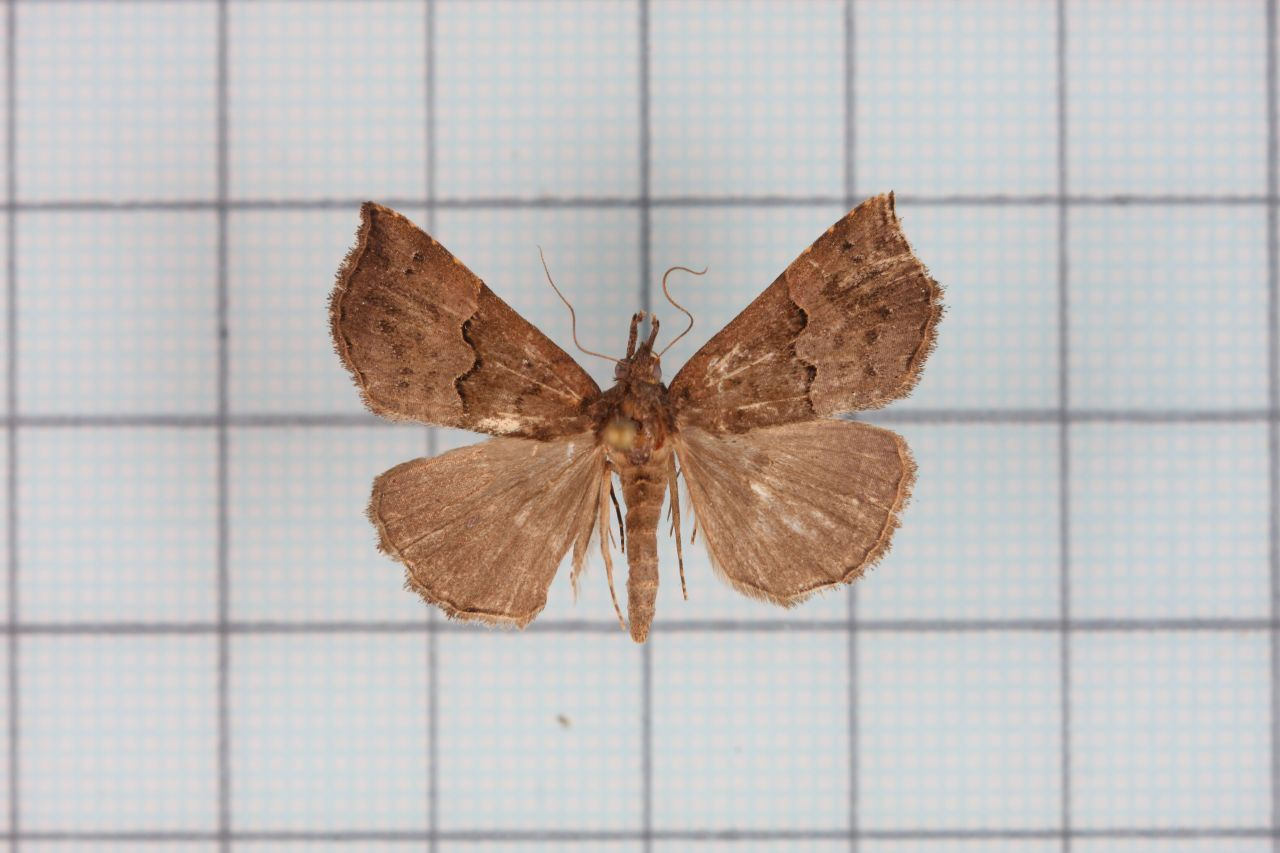

Scientific classification
- Domain: Eukaryota
- Kingdom: Animalia
- Phylum: Arthropoda
- Class: Insecta
- Order: Lepidoptera
- Superfamily: Noctuoidea
- Family: Erebidae
- Genus: Hypena
- Species: H. ophiusoides

Binomial name
- Hypena ophiusoides Moore, 1882

= Hypena ophiusoides =

Species of moth

Hypena ophiusoides is a moth in the family Erebidae first described by Frederic Moore in 1882. It is found in Taiwan.
