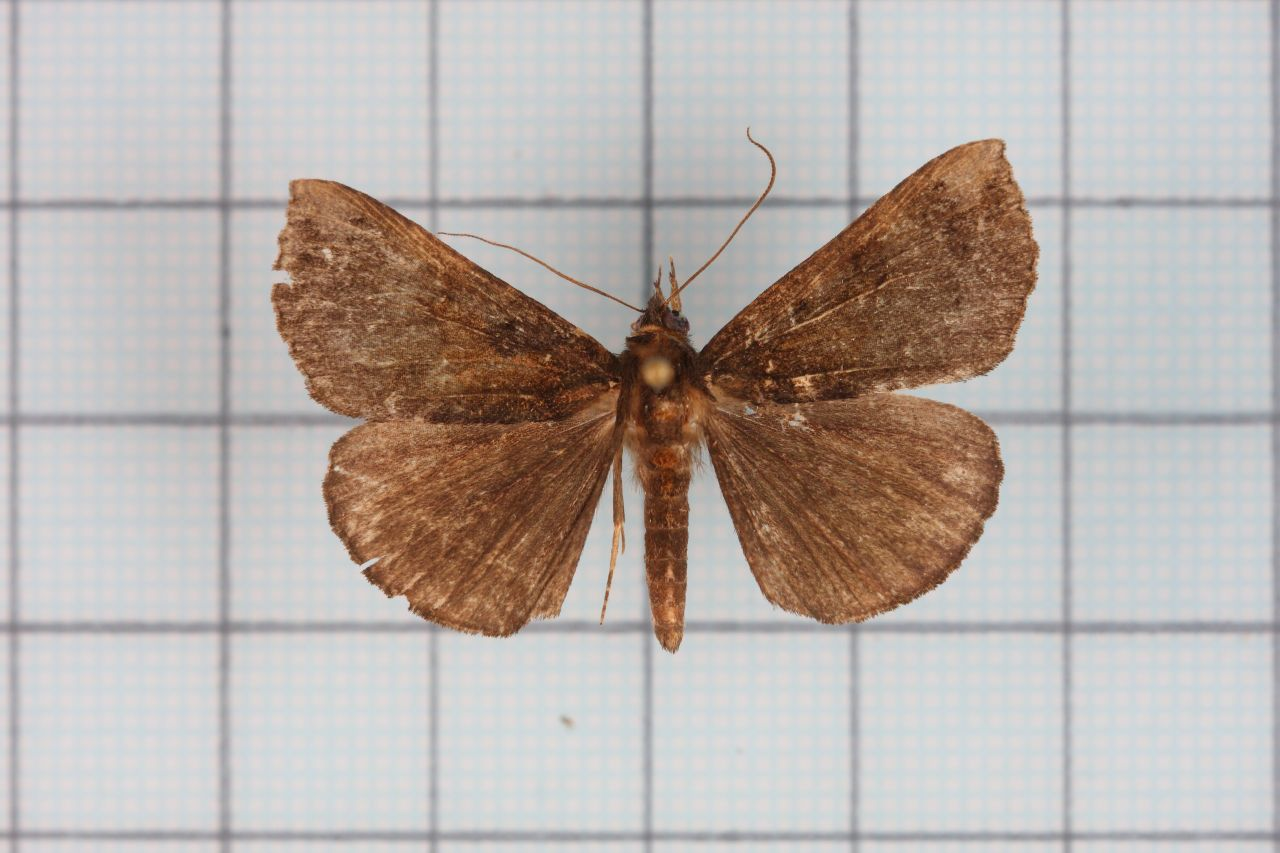

Scientific classification
- Kingdom: Animalia
- Phylum: Arthropoda
- Class: Insecta
- Order: Lepidoptera
- Superfamily: Noctuoidea
- Family: Erebidae
- Genus: Hypena
- Species: H. iconicalis

Binomial name
- Hypena iconicalis Walker, 1859

Synonyms
- Hypena apicipuncta Strand, 1920; Hypena belindana Strand, 1920; Hypena chosokeiana Strand, 1922; Bomolocha herpa Swinhoe, 1901; Hypena similata Moore, 1882; Hypena subnotalis Walker, 1866; Hypena sulalis Walker, 1866

= Hypena iconicalis =

Species of moth

Hypena iconicalis is a moth in the family Noctuidae first described by Francis Walker in 1859. It is found in India, Sri Lanka, Taiwan, Papua New Guinea and Fiji.

== Description ==
Its wingspan is about 30–32 mm. The forewings are much broader. The outer margin is less oblique. Raised tufts are slight. Body reddish-grey brown. Forewings slightly irrorated (sprinkled) with dark specks. There is an indistinct sinuous antemedial line present. A black speck in cell. A medial, straight, almost erect, dark line found with some bluish grey on the outer edge, and often with the area beyond it grey. A more or less developed sinuous submarginal series of black and white specks. Hindwings fuscous. Ventral side with subapical black and white specks to forewing, and indistinct cell spot and postmedial line to hindwing. The males have short palpi and more broadly scaled. Frontal tufts very thick. Some specimens have whitish costa on forewings.

The larvae have been recorded feeding on Moghania macrophylla.
