= Hypena abyssinialis =

Scientific classification
- Kingdom: Animalia
- Phylum: Arthropoda
- Class: Insecta
- Order: Lepidoptera
- Superfamily: Noctuoidea
- Family: Erebidae
- Genus: Hypena
- Species: H. abyssinialis

Binomial name
- Hypena abyssinialis Guenée, 1854

Synonyms
- Hypena dispunctalis Walker, [1866]

Species of moth

Hypena abyssinialis, the streaked snout, is a moth of the family Erebidae. The species was first described by Achille Guenée in 1854. It is found in many African and South Asian countries.

Larval host plants are Lantana camara and Lantana indica.
