= Hypena umbralis =

Scientific classification
- Domain: Eukaryota
- Kingdom: Animalia
- Phylum: Arthropoda
- Class: Insecta
- Order: Lepidoptera
- Superfamily: Noctuoidea
- Family: Erebidae
- Genus: Hypena
- Species: H. umbralis

Binomial name
- Hypena umbralis (Smith, 1884)

Species of moth

Hypena umbralis, the banded bomolocha moth, is a species of moth in the family Erebidae.

The MONA or Hodges number for Hypena umbralis is 8453.
