= Hypena malagasy =

Scientific classification
- Kingdom: Animalia
- Phylum: Arthropoda
- Class: Insecta
- Order: Lepidoptera
- Superfamily: Noctuoidea
- Family: Erebidae
- Genus: Hypena
- Species: H. malagasy

Binomial name
- Hypena malagasy (Viette, 1968)

Synonyms
- Sarmatia malagasy Viette, 1968

Species of moth

Hypena malagasy is a moth of the family Erebidae first described by Pierre Viette in 1968. It is native to central eastern Madagascar.

This species has a wingspan of 34 mm. The basic colour of its wings is violet brown or chocolate brown.
