= Hypena vega =

Scientific classification
- Domain: Eukaryota
- Kingdom: Animalia
- Phylum: Arthropoda
- Class: Insecta
- Order: Lepidoptera
- Superfamily: Noctuoidea
- Family: Erebidae
- Genus: Hypena
- Species: H. vega

Binomial name
- Hypena vega (Smith, 1900)

Species of moth

Hypena vega is a species of moth in the family Erebidae.

The MONA or Hodges number for Hypena vega is 8451.
