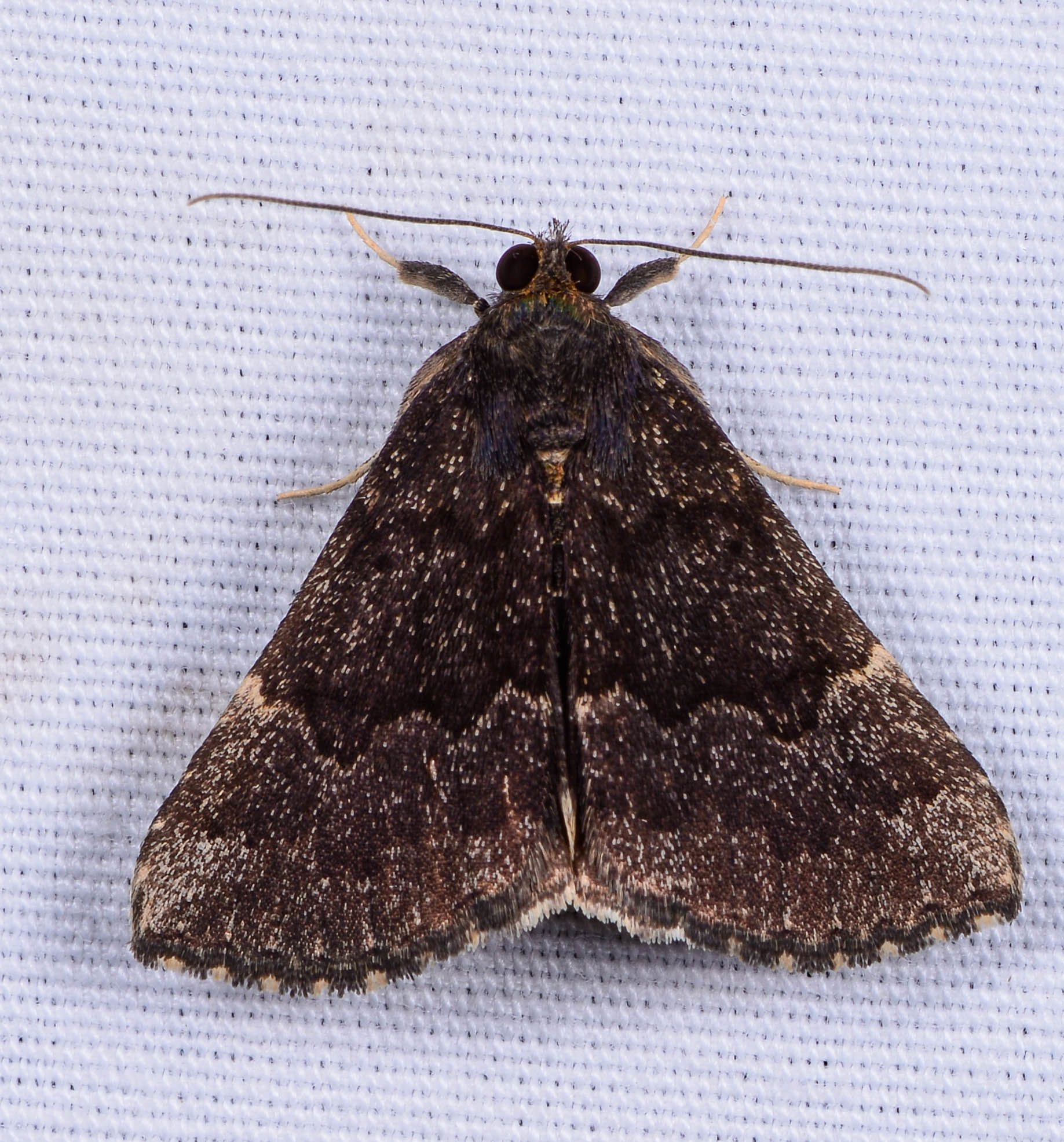

Scientific classification
- Kingdom: Animalia
- Phylum: Arthropoda
- Class: Insecta
- Order: Lepidoptera
- Superfamily: Noctuoidea
- Family: Erebidae
- Genus: Hypena
- Species: H. sordidula

Binomial name
- Hypena sordidula Grote, 1872

Synonyms
- Bomolocha sordidula (Grote, 1872)

= Hypena sordidula =

Species of moth

Hypena sordidula, the sordid hypena or sordid bomolocha moth, is a moth of the family Erebidae. The species was first described by Augustus Radcliffe Grote in 1872. It is found in North America from Quebec and Maine south to northern Florida and Texas, west to Louisiana and Kansas, north to Manitoba.

The wingspan is 24–30 mm. The moth flies from May to August. There are two generations per year.

The larvae feed on Laportea species. Two reported hosts, alder and butternut, are incorrect.
