= Hypena heuloa =

Scientific classification
- Domain: Eukaryota
- Kingdom: Animalia
- Phylum: Arthropoda
- Class: Insecta
- Order: Lepidoptera
- Superfamily: Noctuoidea
- Family: Erebidae
- Genus: Hypena
- Species: H. heuloa

Binomial name
- Hypena heuloa (Smith, 1905)

Species of moth

Hypena heuloa is a species of moth in the family Erebidae. It is found in North America.

The MONA or Hodges number for Hypena heuloa is 8449.
