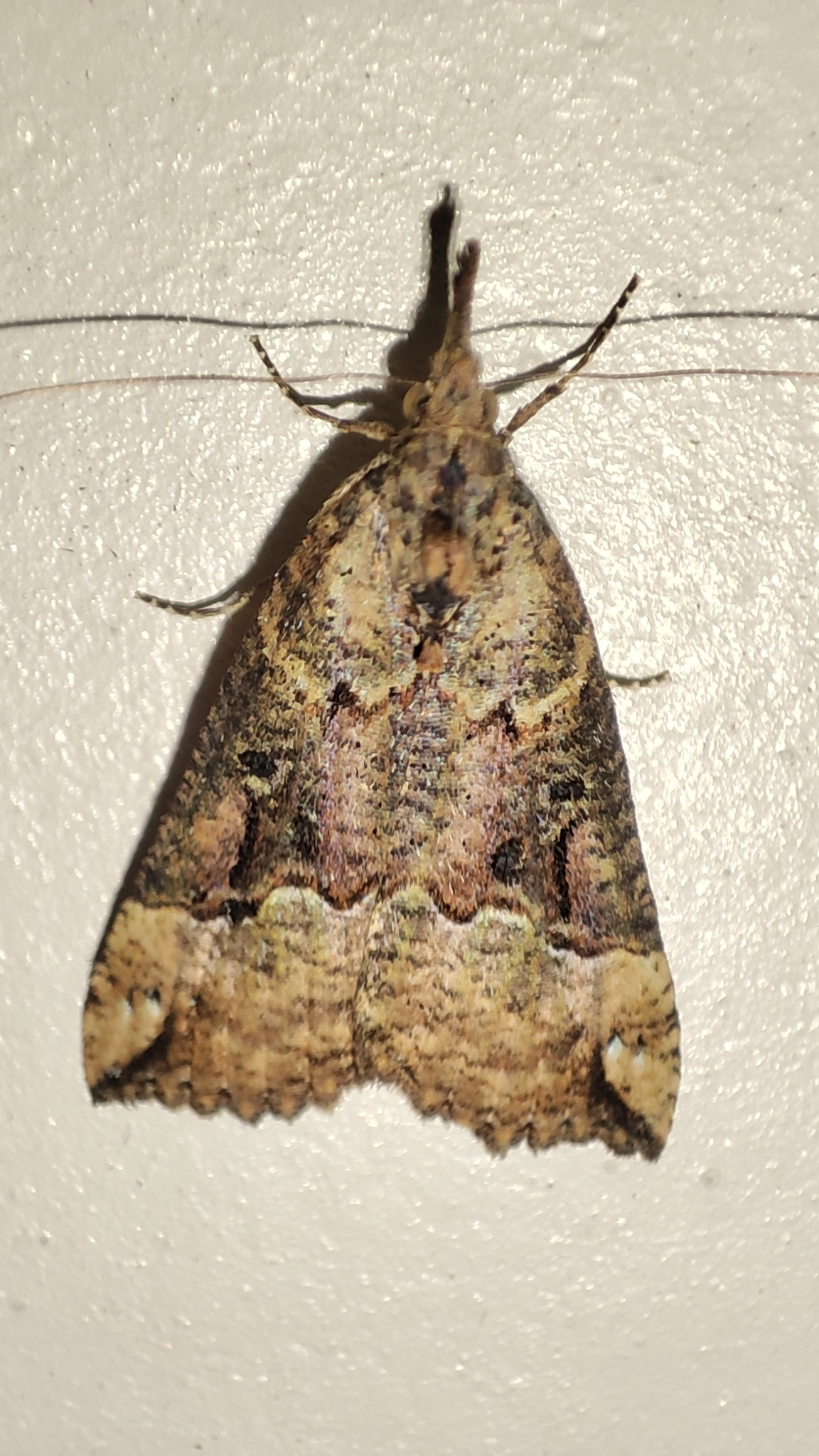

Scientific classification
- Kingdom: Animalia
- Phylum: Arthropoda
- Class: Insecta
- Order: Lepidoptera
- Superfamily: Noctuoidea
- Family: Erebidae
- Genus: Hypena
- Species: H. decorata

Binomial name
- Hypena decorata Smith, 1884

= Hypena decorata =

Species of moth

Hypena decorata, the decorated hypena, is a species of moth in the family Erebidae. It is found in North America.

The MONA or Hodges number for Hypena decorata is 8463.
