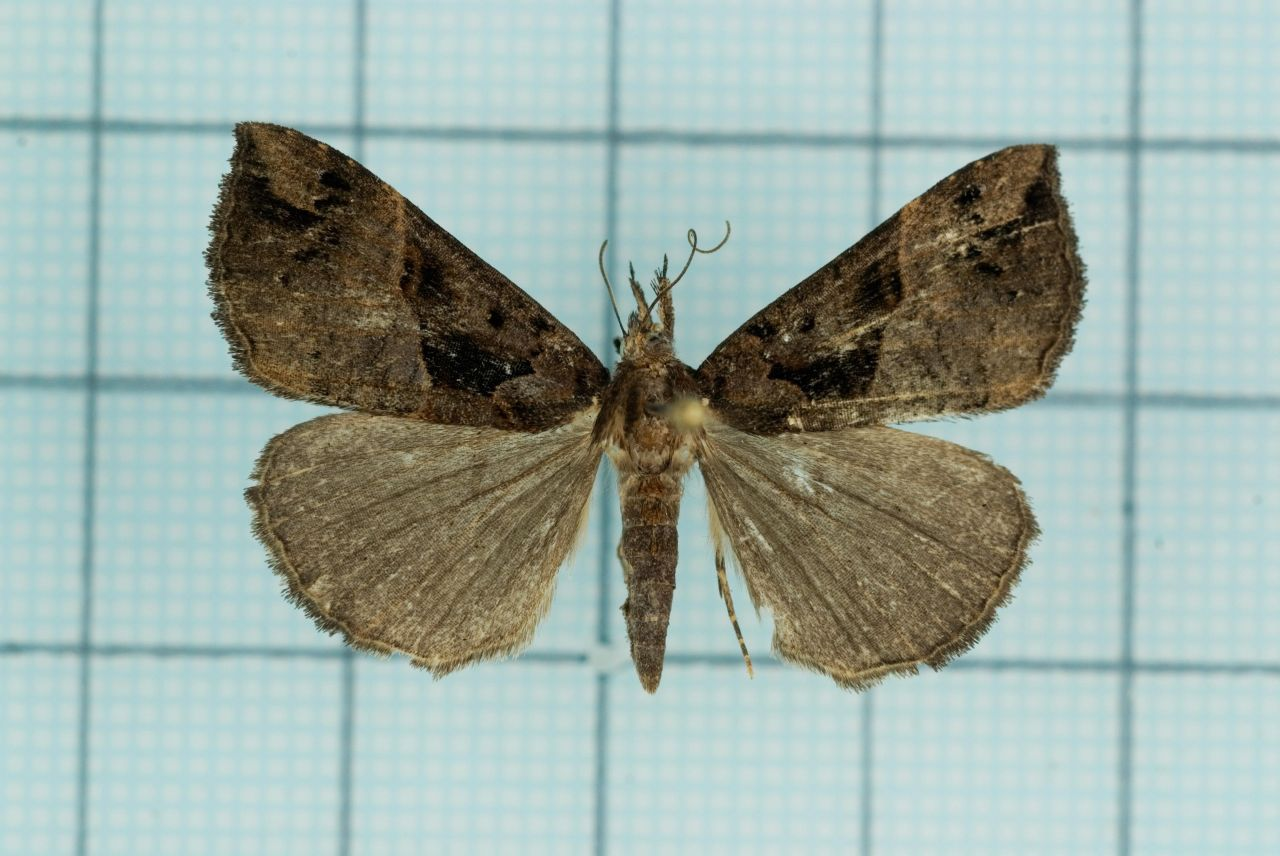
- Female
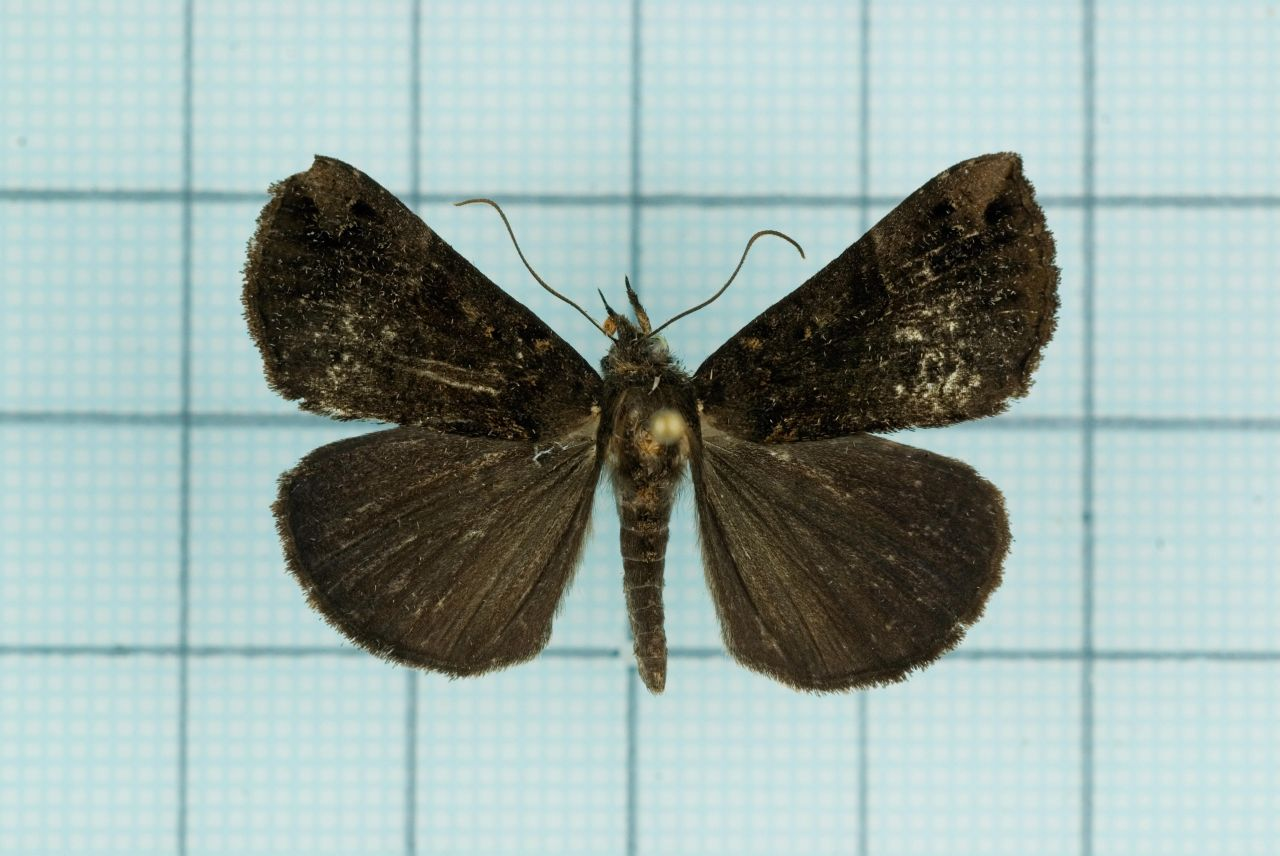
- Male

Scientific classification
- Domain: Eukaryota
- Kingdom: Animalia
- Phylum: Arthropoda
- Class: Insecta
- Order: Lepidoptera
- Superfamily: Noctuoidea
- Family: Erebidae
- Genus: Hypena
- Species: H. tenebralis

Binomial name
- Hypena tenebralis Moore, 1867

= Hypena tenebralis =

Species of moth

Hypena tenebralis is a species of moth in the family Erebidae first described by Frederic Moore in 1867. It is found in Taiwan.
