= Hypena modestoides =

Scientific classification
- Kingdom: Animalia
- Phylum: Arthropoda
- Clade: Pancrustacea
- Class: Insecta
- Order: Lepidoptera
- Superfamily: Noctuoidea
- Family: Erebidae
- Genus: Hypena
- Species: H. modestoides

Binomial name
- Hypena modestoides Poole, 1989

Species of moth

Hypena modestoides is a species of moth in the family Erebidae. It is found in North America.

The MONA or Hodges number for Hypena modestoides is 8464.
