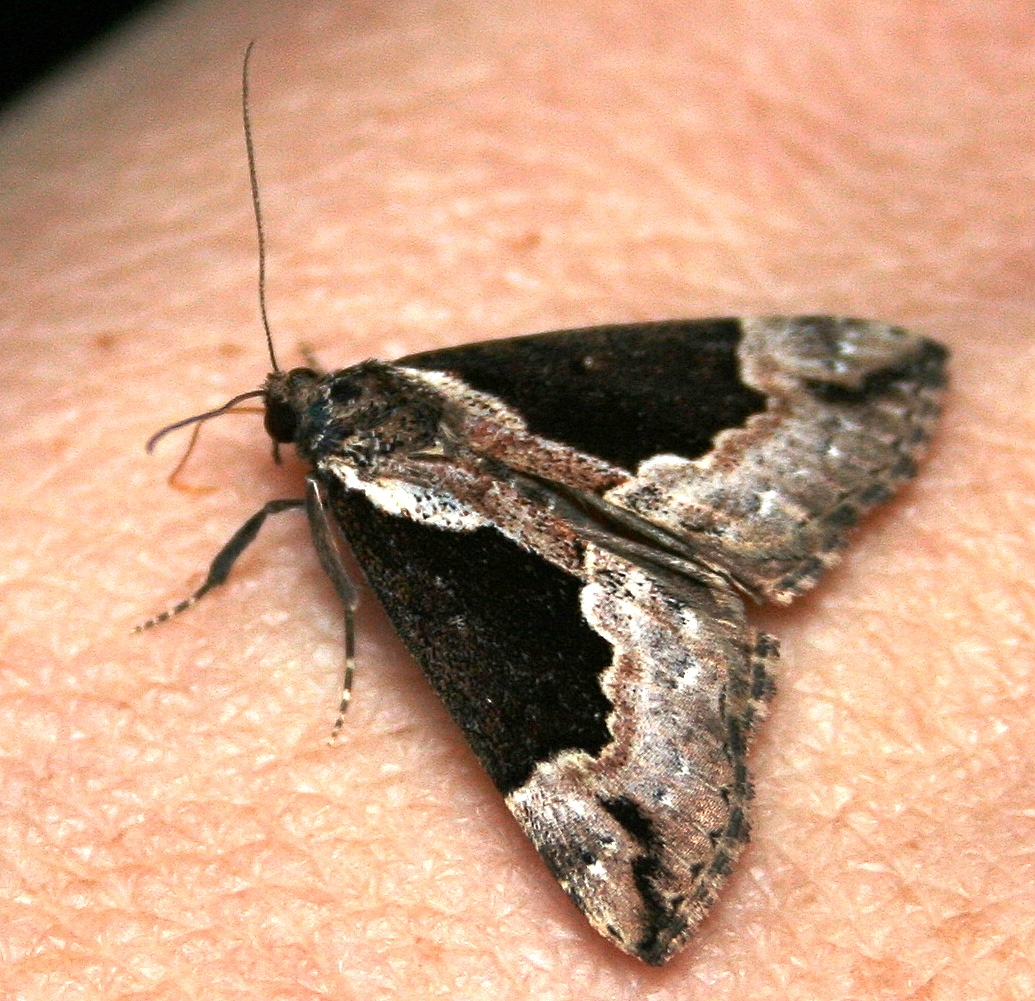

Scientific classification
- Kingdom: Animalia
- Phylum: Arthropoda
- Class: Insecta
- Order: Lepidoptera
- Superfamily: Noctuoidea
- Family: Erebidae
- Genus: Hypena
- Species: H. baltimoralis

Binomial name
- Hypena baltimoralis Guenée, 1854

Synonyms
- Bomolocha baltimoralis

= Hypena baltimoralis =

Species of moth

Hypena baltimoralis, the Baltimore bomolocha or Baltimore hypena, is a moth of the family Erebidae. The species was first described by Achille Guenée in 1854. The moth flies from April to October depending on the location. There are at least two generations in New England and additional generations southward.

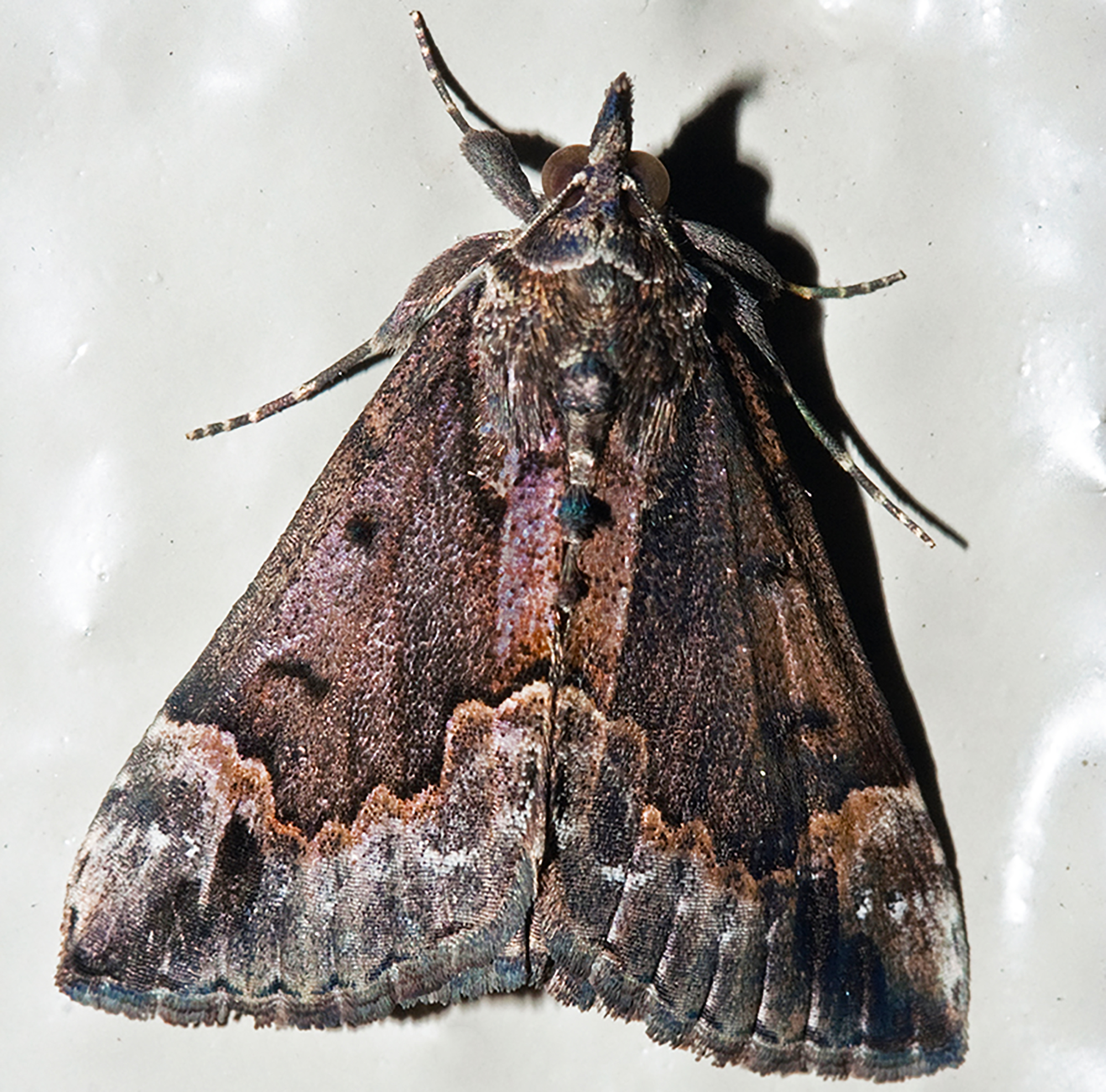
Baltimore Hypena - Hodges#8442 (Hypena baltimoralis)

== Description ==
Adults have a wingspan of 26–32 mm (1.0–1.3 in) and rest with their hindwings tucked behind their forewings, giving them a triangular silhouette. The forewings are grayish-brown and females may have a lighter tint often absent in males. They have a large dark patch covering much of the outer sides of the forewings which extends to about 3/4ths of the length of the wings but does not expand to touch the inner margin. The inner margins and lower areas of the wings are mottled greyish-brown with a dark brown or black diagonal line extending inward from each corner. This is more visible in females.

== Range and Habitat ==
It is found in the eastern part of the United States, west and south to Wisconsin, Missouri and Florida and Texas. They are most commonly sighted in or near deciduous forests.

== Ecology ==
The larvae feed on maple, mainly red and silver maple.
