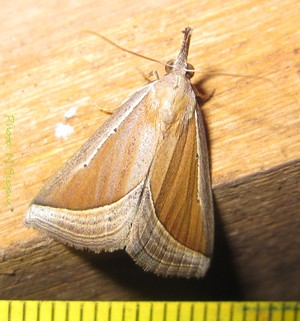

Scientific classification
- Kingdom: Animalia
- Phylum: Arthropoda
- Class: Insecta
- Order: Lepidoptera
- Superfamily: Noctuoidea
- Family: Erebidae
- Genus: Hypena
- Species: H. conscitalis

Binomial name
- Hypena conscitalis (Walker, 1866)

Synonyms
- Ophiuche conscitalis Walker, 1866; Hypena semilutea Snellen 1872; Hypena strigatalis Saalmüller, 1880; Hypena perna Felder & Rogenhofer, 1874

= Hypena conscitalis =

Species of moth

Hypena conscitalis is a moth of the family Erebidae first described by Francis Walker in 1866.

== Distribution ==
It is found throughout Africa, from Senegal to South Africa, in South and South-East Asia as well as in Australia and on some Pacific and Indian Ocean islands (Sri Lanka).

== Description ==
Its wingspan is about 20–25 mm. Forewings much broader. The outer margin less oblique. Raised tufts are slight. Forewings have a grey fascia on costal area. There is a black speck found at end of cell. The oblique line further from the base, which is slightly curved and with a grey line beyond it more prominent and curved.

They larvae feed on Desmodium intortum (Fabaceae).
