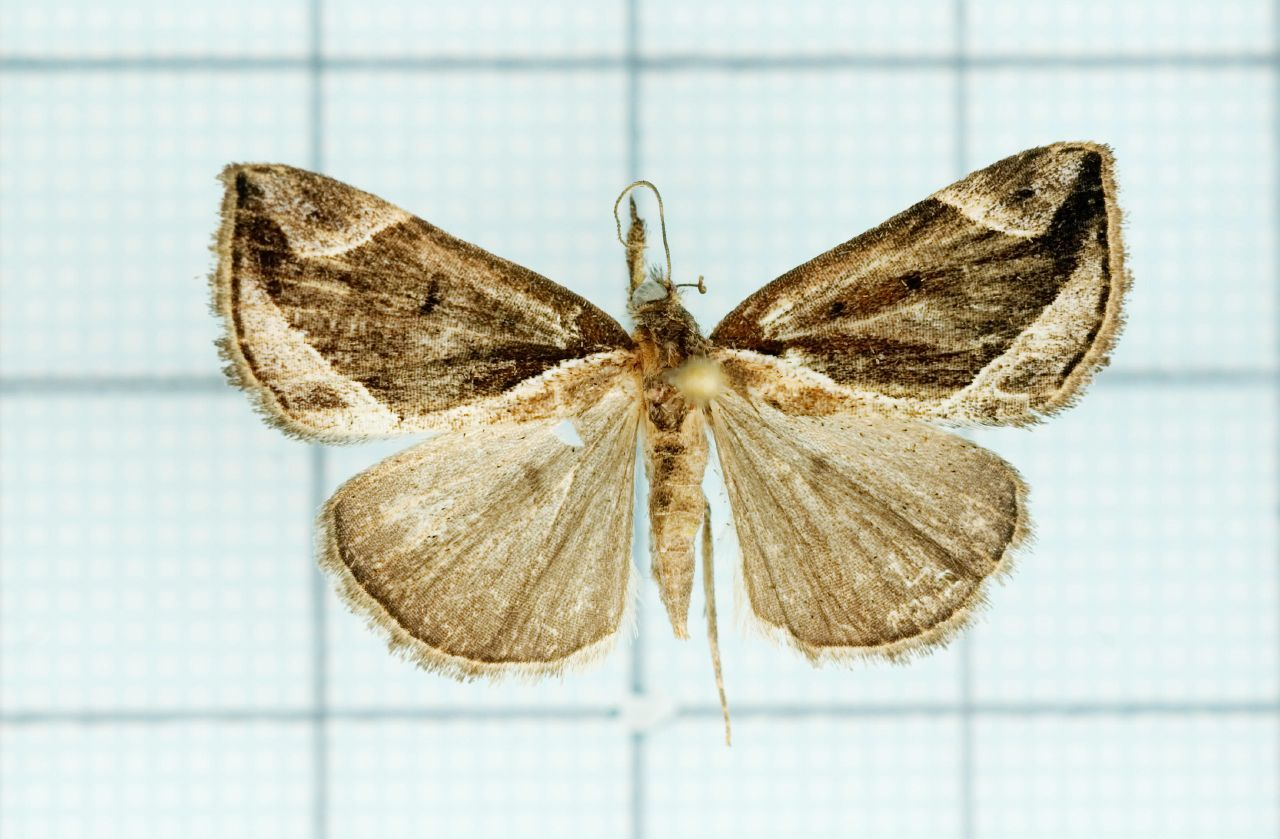

Scientific classification
- Domain: Eukaryota
- Kingdom: Animalia
- Phylum: Arthropoda
- Class: Insecta
- Order: Lepidoptera
- Superfamily: Noctuoidea
- Family: Erebidae
- Genus: Hypena
- Species: H. perspicua

Binomial name
- Hypena perspicua Leech, 1900

Synonyms
- Hypena rhombalis var. perspicua Leech, 1900

= Hypena perspicua =

Species of moth

Hypena perspicua is a moth in the family Erebidae first described by John Henry Leech in 1900. It is found in Taiwan.
