= Hypena obfuscalis =

Scientific classification
- Kingdom: Animalia
- Phylum: Arthropoda
- Class: Insecta
- Order: Lepidoptera
- Superfamily: Noctuoidea
- Family: Erebidae
- Genus: Hypena
- Species: H. obfuscalis

Binomial name
- Hypena obfuscalis Hampson, 1893

Species of moth

Hypena obfuscalis is a moth of the family Erebidae first described by George Hampson in 1893. It is found in Sri Lanka.
