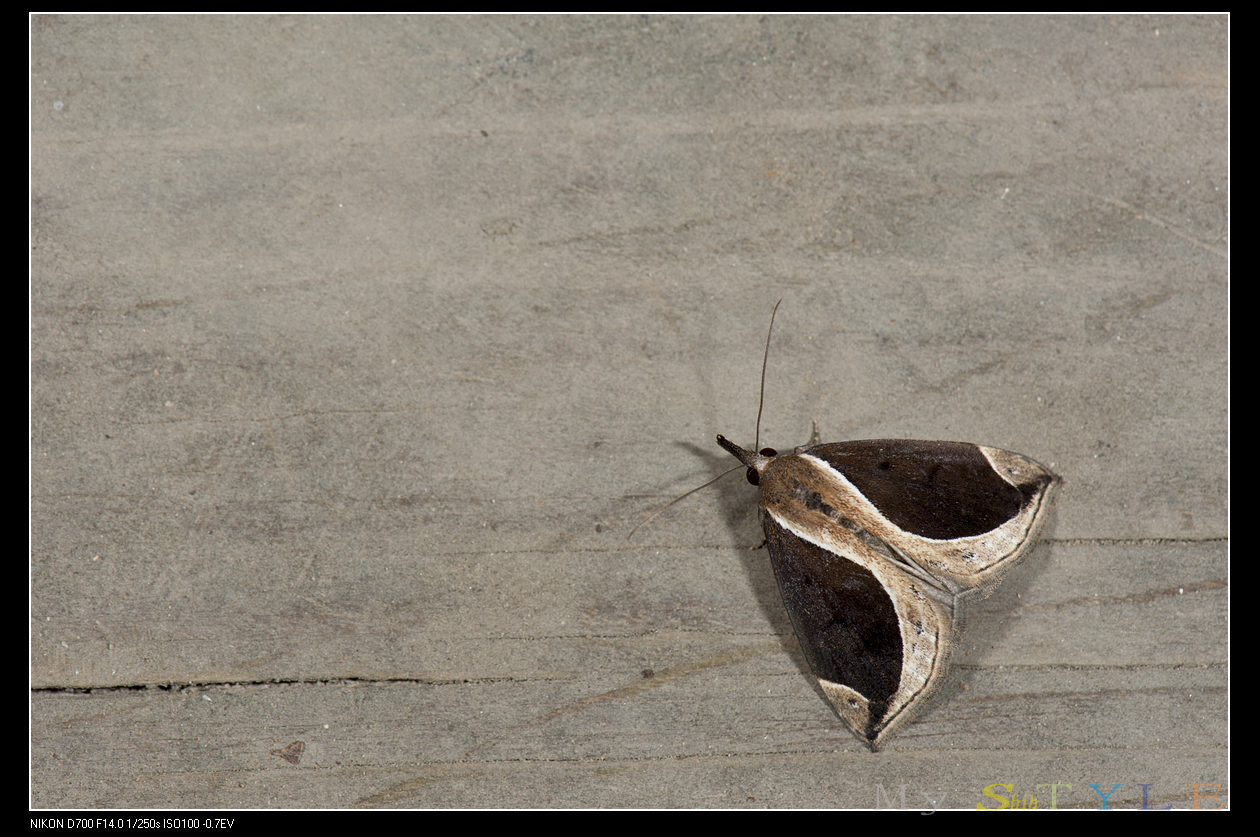

Scientific classification
- Kingdom: Animalia
- Phylum: Arthropoda
- Class: Insecta
- Order: Lepidoptera
- Superfamily: Noctuoidea
- Family: Erebidae
- Genus: Hypena
- Species: H. taiwana

Binomial name
- Hypena taiwana (Wileman, 1915)

Synonyms
- Bomolocha taiwana Wileman, 1915

= Hypena taiwana =

Species of moth

Hypena taiwana is a moth of the family Erebidae first described by Alfred Ernest Wileman in 1915. It is found in Taiwan.
