= Hypena jocosalis =

Scientific classification
- Kingdom: Animalia
- Phylum: Arthropoda
- Class: Insecta
- Order: Lepidoptera
- Superfamily: Noctuoidea
- Family: Erebidae
- Genus: Hypena
- Species: H. jocosalis

Binomial name
- Hypena jocosalis Walker, [1859]

Species of moth

Hypena jocosalis, is a moth of the family Erebidae first described by Francis Walker in 1859. It is found in Sri Lanka.
