= Hypena namaqualis =

Scientific classification
- Kingdom: Animalia
- Phylum: Arthropoda
- Class: Insecta
- Order: Lepidoptera
- Superfamily: Noctuoidea
- Family: Erebidae
- Genus: Hypena
- Species: H. namaqualis

Binomial name
- Hypena namaqualis Guenée, 1854

Synonyms
- Phanaspa namaqualis (Guenée, 1854); Hypena aegonalis Walker, [1859]; Phanaspa dilatalis Walker, [1866]

Species of moth

Hypena namaqualis is a moth of the family Erebidae. It was described by Achille Guenée in 1854. It is found in South Africa.
