= Hypena polycyma =

Scientific classification
- Kingdom: Animalia
- Phylum: Arthropoda
- Class: Insecta
- Order: Lepidoptera
- Superfamily: Noctuoidea
- Family: Erebidae
- Genus: Hypena
- Species: H. polycyma

Binomial name
- Hypena polycyma Hampson, 1902

Species of moth

Hypena polycyma is a moth of the family Erebidae first described by George Hampson in 1902. This species is known from South Africa, Kenya, Madagascar and Réunion.

It is dark brown, struck with black and has a wingspan of 34 mm. This species can easily be confused with Hypena vulgatalis.
