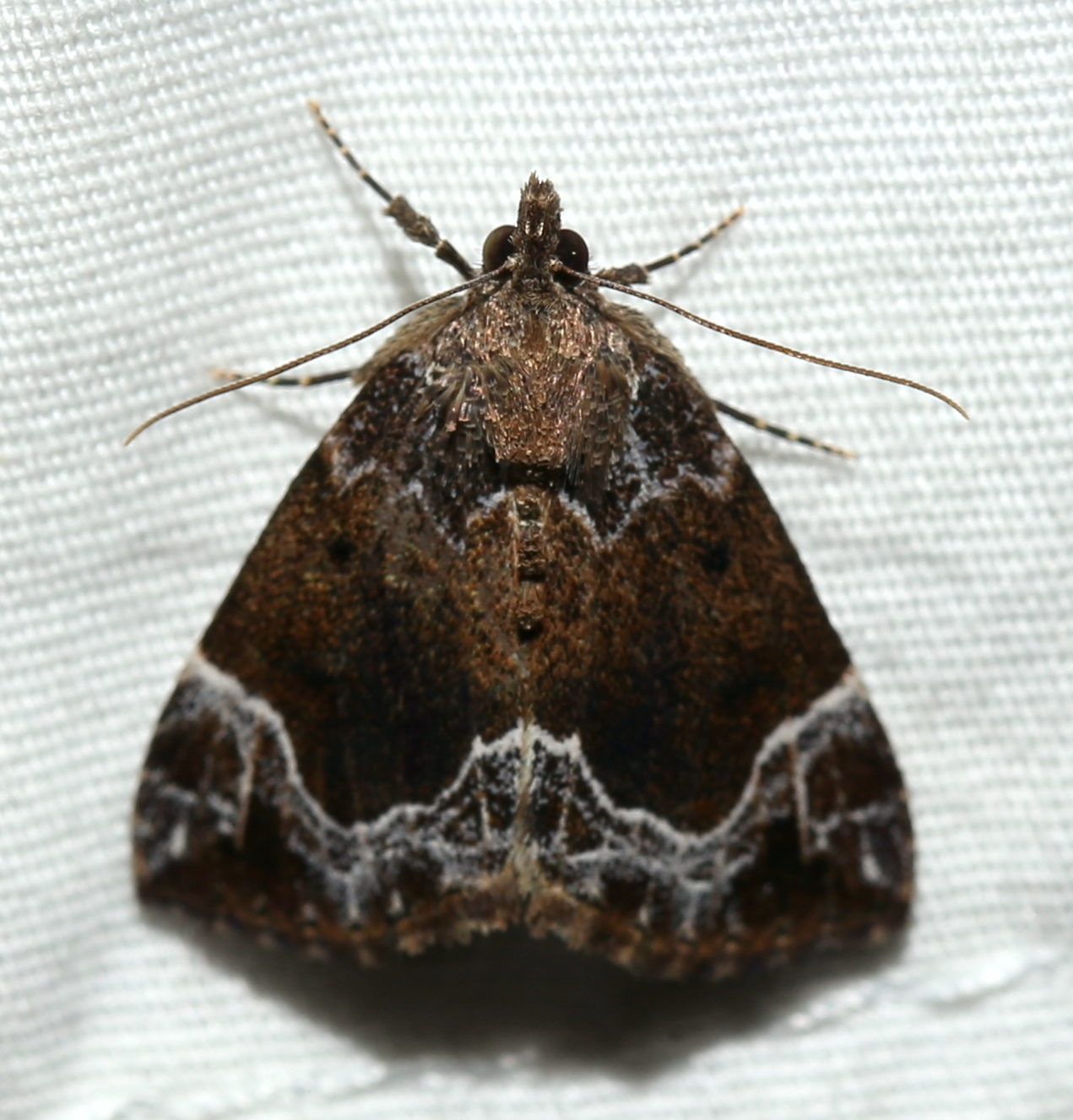

Scientific classification
- Kingdom: Animalia
- Phylum: Arthropoda
- Class: Insecta
- Order: Lepidoptera
- Superfamily: Noctuoidea
- Family: Erebidae
- Genus: Hypena
- Species: H. abalienalis

Binomial name
- Hypena abalienalis Walker, 1859

Synonyms
- Bomolocha abalienalis (Walker, 1859)

= Hypena abalienalis =

Species of moth

Hypena abalienalis, the white-lined hypena or white-lined bomolocha moth, is a moth of the family Erebidae. The species was first described by Francis Walker in 1859. It is found from southern Canada to northern Florida and Texas.

The wingspan is 25–33 mm. The moth flies from April to August. There are at least two generations per year.
