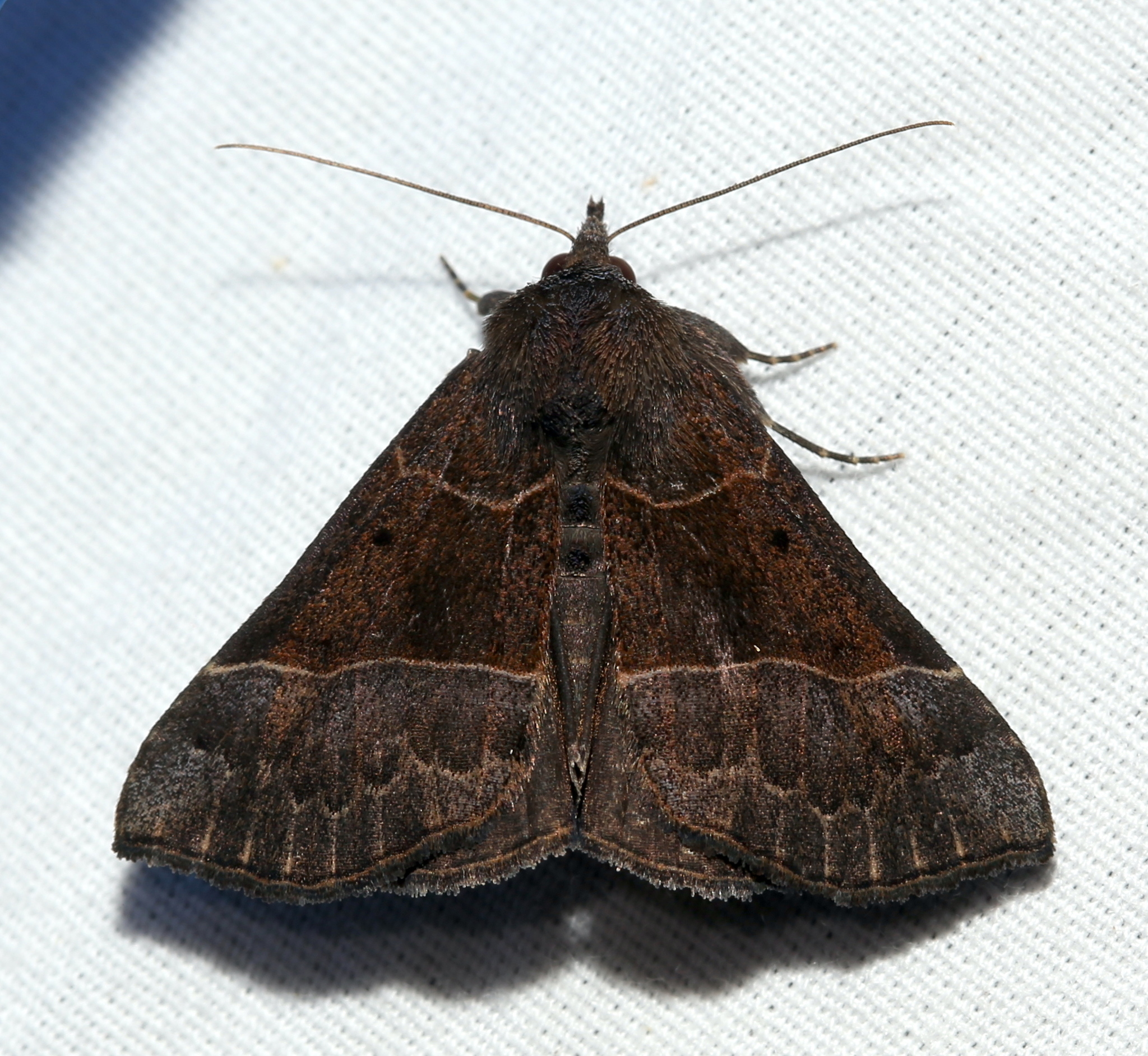

Scientific classification
- Kingdom: Animalia
- Phylum: Arthropoda
- Class: Insecta
- Order: Lepidoptera
- Superfamily: Noctuoidea
- Family: Erebidae
- Genus: Hypena
- Species: H. deceptalis

Binomial name
- Hypena deceptalis Walker, 1859

Synonyms
- Bomolocha deceptalis

= Hypena deceptalis =

Species of moth

Hypena deceptalis, the deceptive hypena or deceptive bomolocha moth, is a moth of the family Erebidae. The species was first described by Francis Walker in 1859. It is found in North America from Manitoba to Quebec, south to Florida and Texas. It is absent from much of Gulf Coastal Plain though.

The wingspan is 28–35 mm. The moth flies from April to August. There are two generations per year.

The larvae feed on Tilia americana, but the species is also found outside of the range of Tilia americana, so there must be at least one other host.
