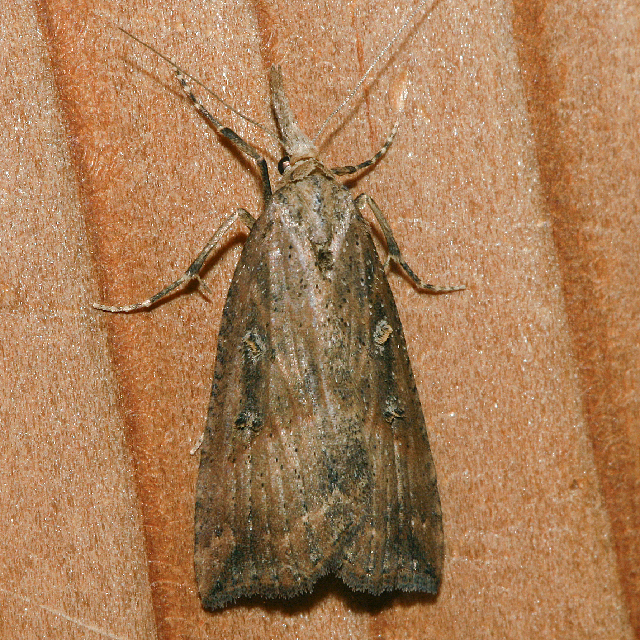

Scientific classification
- Kingdom: Animalia
- Phylum: Arthropoda
- Class: Insecta
- Order: Lepidoptera
- Superfamily: Noctuoidea
- Family: Erebidae
- Genus: Hypena
- Species: H. californica

Binomial name
- Hypena californica Behr, 1870

= Hypena californica =

Species of moth

Hypena californica, known generally as the California cloverworm moth or western bomolocha, is a species of moth in the family Erebidae.

The larvae are food specialists, feeding mainly on the Urtica species, commonly known as nettles.

The MONA or Hodges number for Hypena californica is 8462.

== Distribution & Habitat ==
Sightings of Hypena californica are mostly concentrated on the West coast of North America, from southern California to southern British Columbia, with some sightings further inland on the western edge of Idaho. Within these areas, California cloverworm moths typically live in coastal rainforests and mixed hardwood forests at relatively low elevations (where they are fairly common), while preferring riparian zones at higher elevations in the mountains.

== Economic Importance ==
Hypena californica has never been, and currently is not, of any economical importance.
