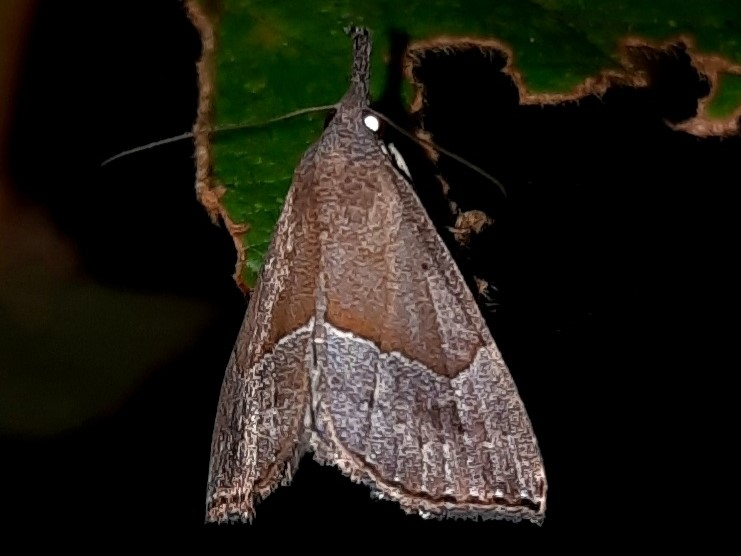

Scientific classification
- Domain: Eukaryota
- Kingdom: Animalia
- Phylum: Arthropoda
- Class: Insecta
- Order: Lepidoptera
- Superfamily: Noctuoidea
- Family: Erebidae
- Genus: Hypena
- Species: H. porrectalis

Binomial name
- Hypena porrectalis (Fabricius, 1794)

= Hypena porrectalis =

Species of moth

Hypena porrectalis is a species of moth in the family Erebidae. It is found in North America.
