= Hypena mandatalis =

Scientific classification
- Kingdom: Animalia
- Phylum: Arthropoda
- Clade: Pancrustacea
- Class: Insecta
- Order: Lepidoptera
- Superfamily: Noctuoidea
- Family: Erebidae
- Genus: Hypena
- Species: H. mandatalis

Binomial name
- Hypena mandatalis Walker, [1859]

Species of moth

Hypena mandatalis, is a moth of the family Erebidae first described by Francis Walker in 1859. It is found in the Indian subregion, Pakistan, Sri Lanka, Borneo, Sulawesi and Australia.

Labial palpi long and held straight out in front like a beak. Forewings ochreous brown, which is darker in the male than in the female. Forewing tips recurved. Possess a triarcuate forewing postmedial. A mauve tinge found along the costa. Anterior discal spot is clearly visible. A conspicuous dark brown band runs from just distal to the discal spots. Hindwings are plain greyish brown. Larval food plants include Acacia mangium.
