= Hypena munitalis =

Scientific classification
- Domain: Eukaryota
- Kingdom: Animalia
- Phylum: Arthropoda
- Class: Insecta
- Order: Lepidoptera
- Superfamily: Noctuoidea
- Family: Erebidae
- Genus: Hypena
- Species: H. munitalis

Binomial name
- Hypena munitalis Mann, 1861

Species of moth

Hypena munitalis is a moth of the family Erebidae first described by Josef Johann Mann in 1861. It is found in Turkey, the Balkans and the Armenian-Caucasian region. In the Levant it has been recorded from Lebanon and Israel.

Adults are on wing in July in Israel. There are two generations per year.

The larvae feed on Stellaria and Vincetoxicum species.
