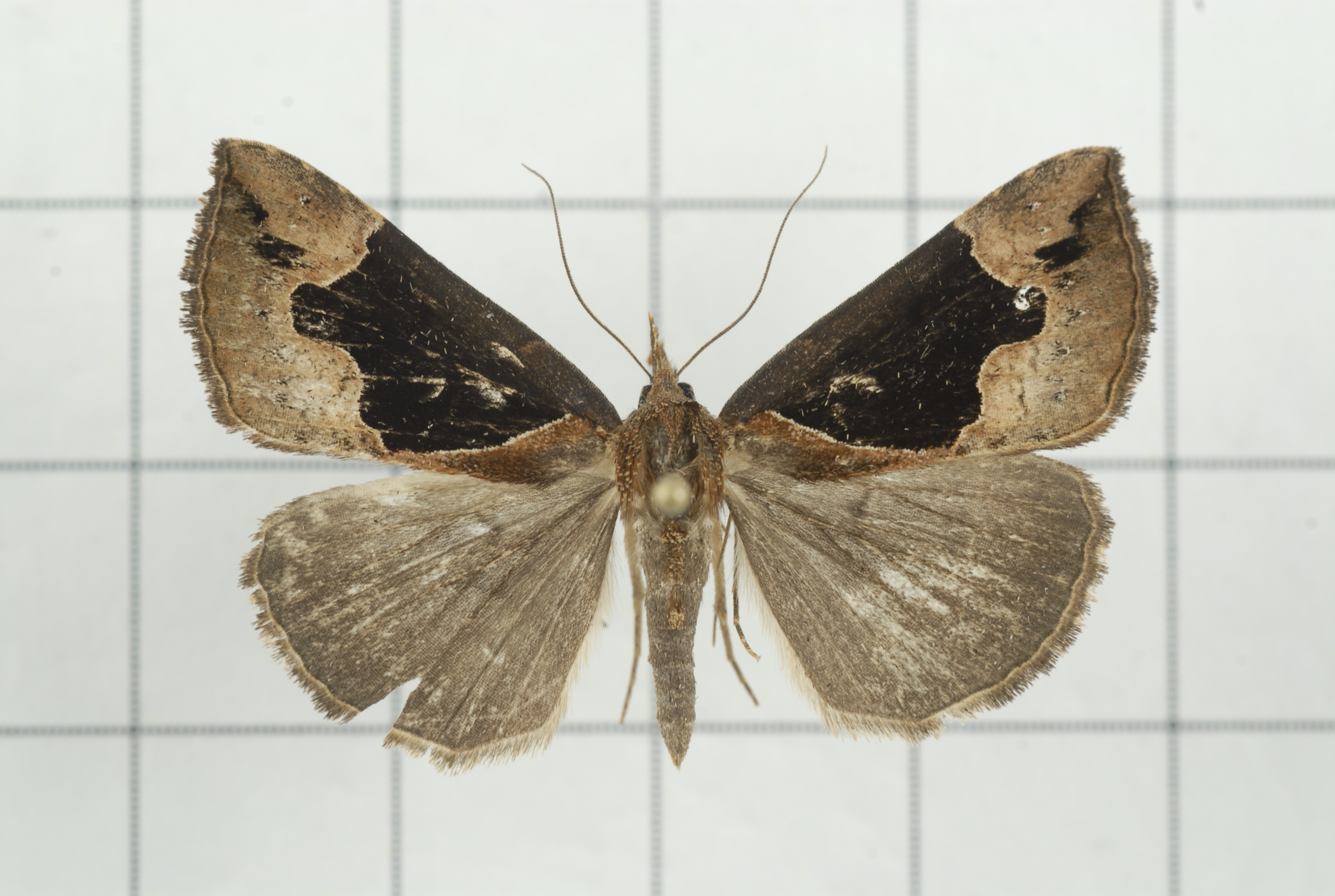

Scientific classification
- Kingdom: Animalia
- Phylum: Arthropoda
- Clade: Pancrustacea
- Class: Insecta
- Order: Lepidoptera
- Superfamily: Noctuoidea
- Family: Erebidae
- Genus: Hypena
- Species: H. vestita

Binomial name
- Hypena vestita (Moore, [1885])

Synonyms
- Bomolocha vestita Moore, [1885]; Bomolocha obductalis Walker sensu Holloway, 1976

= Hypena vestita =

Species of moth

Hypena vestita is a moth of the family Erebidae first described by Frederic Moore in 1885. It is found in India, Sri Lanka and Borneo.

Forewings uniform greyish brown. Submarginal dark marking distal to dentate. Postmedial border of the black area curves.
