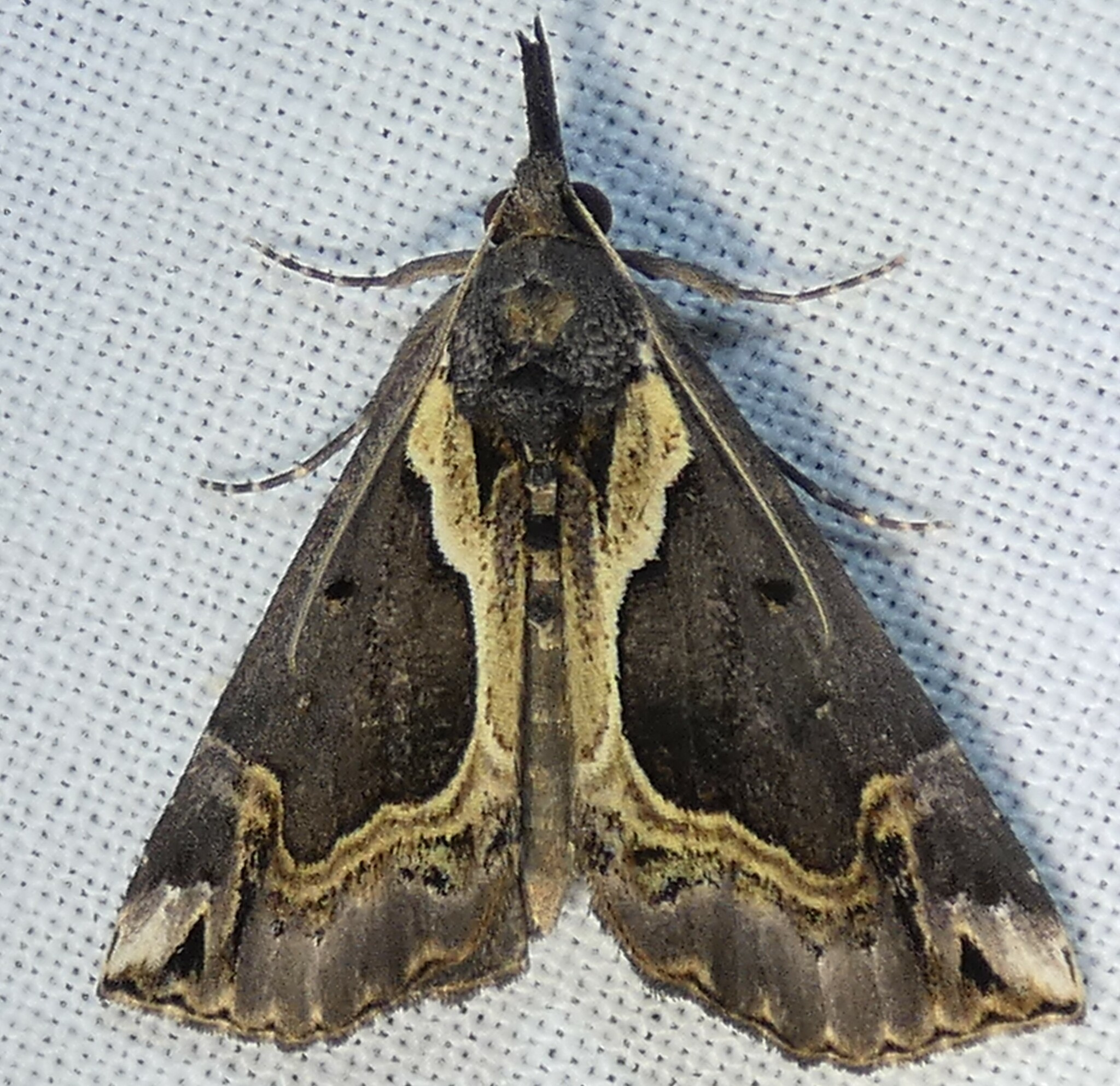

Scientific classification
- Domain: Eukaryota
- Kingdom: Animalia
- Phylum: Arthropoda
- Class: Insecta
- Order: Lepidoptera
- Superfamily: Noctuoidea
- Family: Erebidae
- Genus: Hypena
- Species: H. ramstadtii

Binomial name
- Hypena ramstadtii (Wyatt, 1967)

= Hypena ramstadtii =

Species of moth

Hypena ramstadtii, or Ramstadt's hypena, is a species of moth in the family Erebidae. It was first described by Alex K. Wyatt in 1967 and is found in North America.
