= Hypena assimilis =

Scientific classification
- Kingdom: Animalia
- Phylum: Arthropoda
- Class: Insecta
- Order: Lepidoptera
- Superfamily: Noctuoidea
- Family: Erebidae
- Genus: Hypena
- Species: H. assimilis

Binomial name
- Hypena assimilis Hampson, 1891

Species of moth

Hypena assimilis, is a moth of the family Erebidae first described by George Hampson in 1891. It is found in India, Sri Lanka and Taiwan.
