= Hypena vetustalis =

Scientific classification
- Kingdom: Animalia
- Phylum: Arthropoda
- Class: Insecta
- Order: Lepidoptera
- Superfamily: Noctuoidea
- Family: Erebidae
- Genus: Hypena
- Species: H. vetustalis

Binomial name
- Hypena vetustalis Guenée, 1854

Species of moth

Hypena vetustalis, the tropical bomolocha moth, is a species of moth in the family Erebidae. It is found in North America.

The MONA or Hodges number for Hypena vetustalis is 8454.1.
