= Hypena molpusalis =

Scientific classification
- Kingdom: Animalia
- Phylum: Arthropoda
- Class: Insecta
- Order: Lepidoptera
- Superfamily: Noctuoidea
- Family: Erebidae
- Genus: Hypena
- Species: H. molpusalis

Binomial name
- Hypena molpusalis Walker, 1859

Synonyms
- Hypena sparsalis Walker, [1866]; Hypena subapicalis Walker, [1866]

Species of moth

Hypena molpusalis, is a moth of the family Erebidae first described by Francis Walker in 1859. It is found in Sri Lanka.
