= Hypena atomaria =

Scientific classification
- Domain: Eukaryota
- Kingdom: Animalia
- Phylum: Arthropoda
- Class: Insecta
- Order: Lepidoptera
- Superfamily: Noctuoidea
- Family: Erebidae
- Genus: Hypena
- Species: H. atomaria

Binomial name
- Hypena atomaria (Smith, 1903)

Species of moth

Hypena atomaria, the speckled snout moth, is a species of moth in the family Erebidae.

The MONA or Hodges number for Hypena atomaria is 8450.
