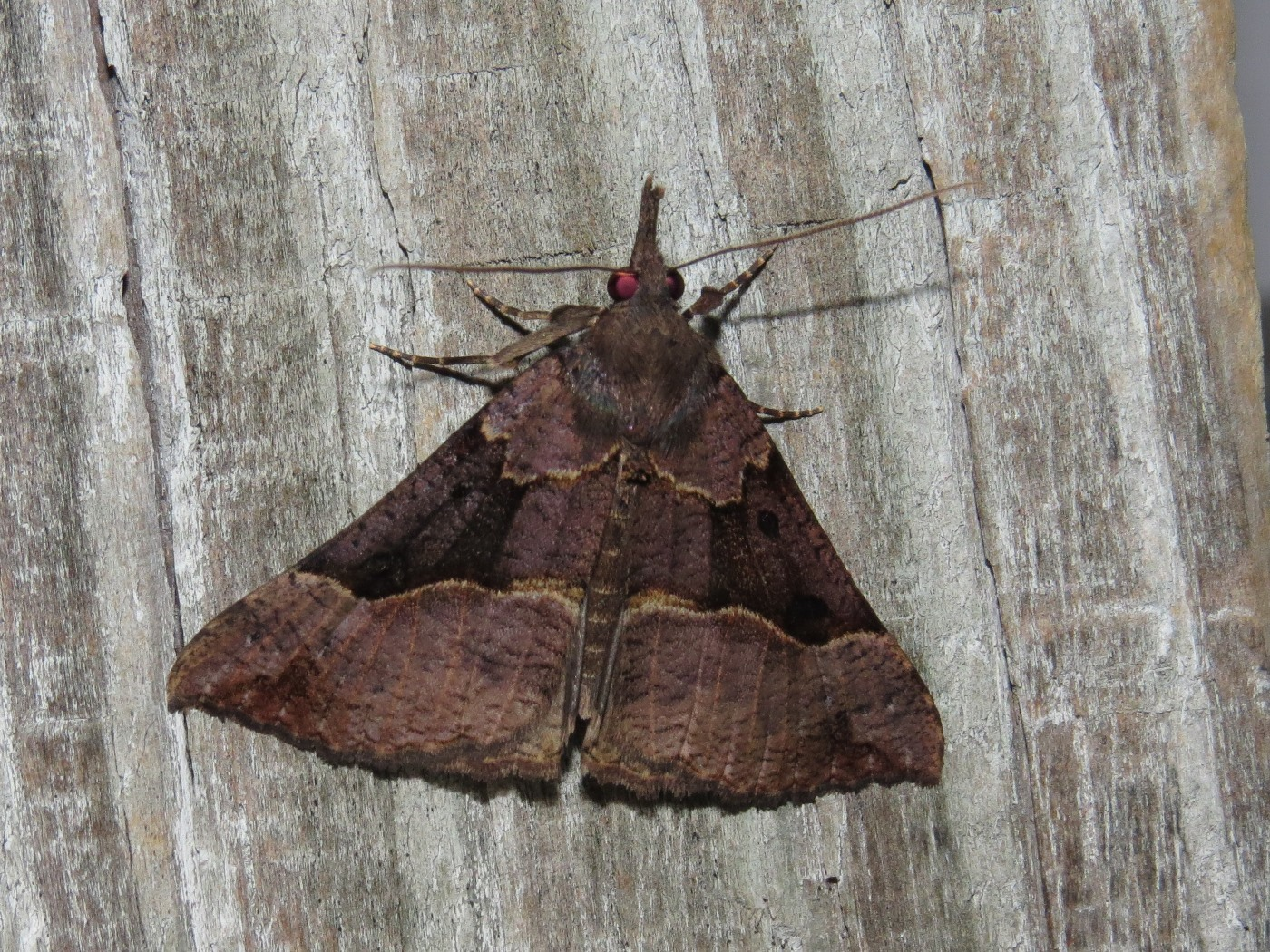

Scientific classification
- Kingdom: Animalia
- Phylum: Arthropoda
- Class: Insecta
- Order: Lepidoptera
- Superfamily: Noctuoidea
- Family: Erebidae
- Genus: Hypena
- Species: H. edictalis

Binomial name
- Hypena edictalis Walker, 1859

Synonyms
- Bomolocha edictalis; Hypena vellifera; Hypena lentiginosa

= Hypena edictalis =

Species of moth

Hypena edictalis, the large bomolocha, is a moth of the family Erebidae. The species was first described by Francis Walker in 1859. It is found in North America from Quebec and Maine south to Virginia and Kentucky, west to the foothills of Alberta and the Peace River area of British Columbia.

The wingspan is 33–37 mm. The moth flies from June to August depending on the location. There is one generation in the north and at least partial second generation from Ohio south through the Appalachian mountains.

The larvae feed on Laportea species.
