= Hypena colombana =

Scientific classification
- Domain: Eukaryota
- Kingdom: Animalia
- Phylum: Arthropoda
- Class: Insecta
- Order: Lepidoptera
- Superfamily: Noctuoidea
- Family: Erebidae
- Genus: Hypena
- Species: H. colombana

Binomial name
- Hypena colombana Moore, [1885]

Synonyms
- Hypena biangulata Moore, [1885]

Species of moth

Hypena colombana, is a moth of the family Erebidae first described by Frederic Moore in 1855. It is found in Sri Lanka.
