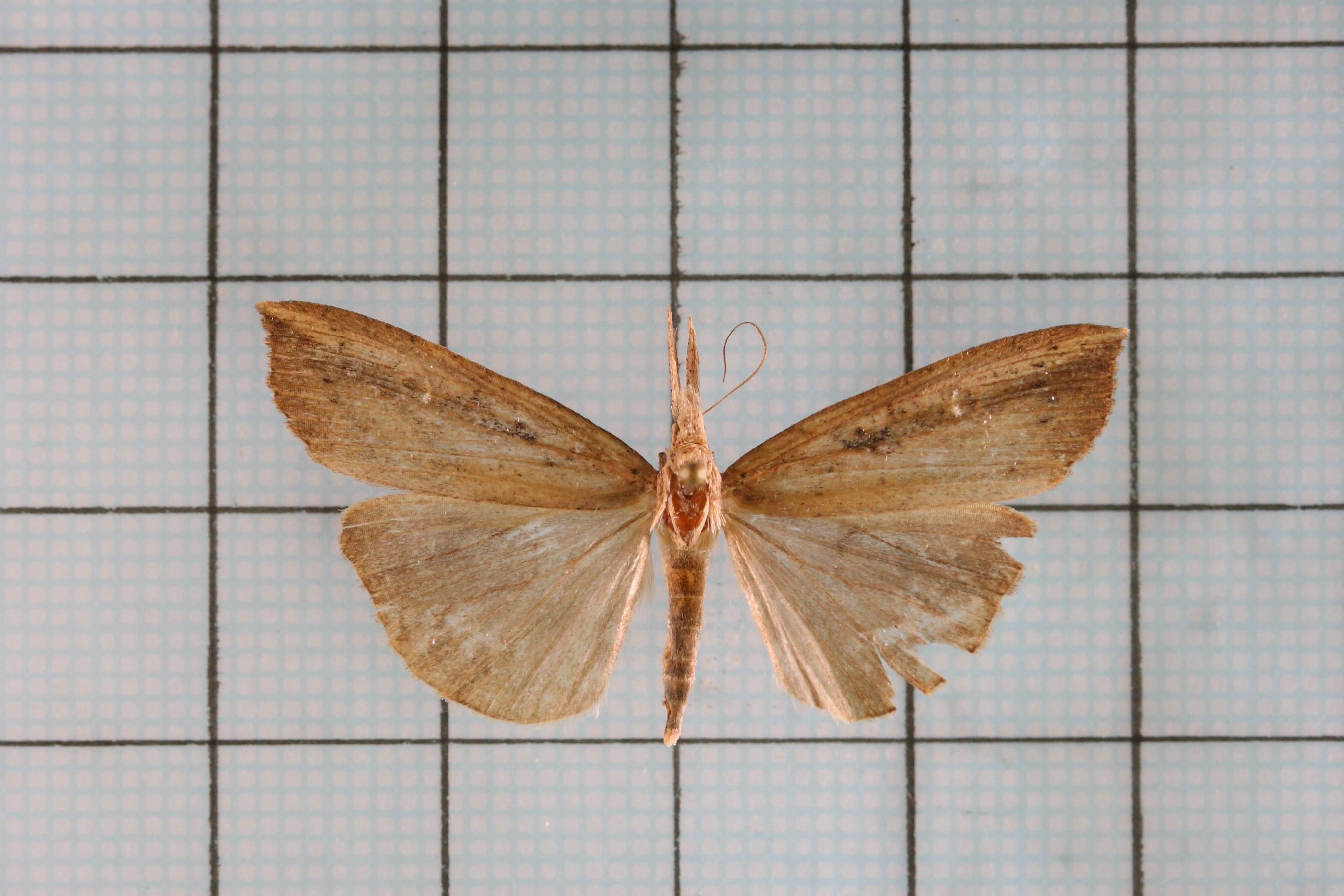

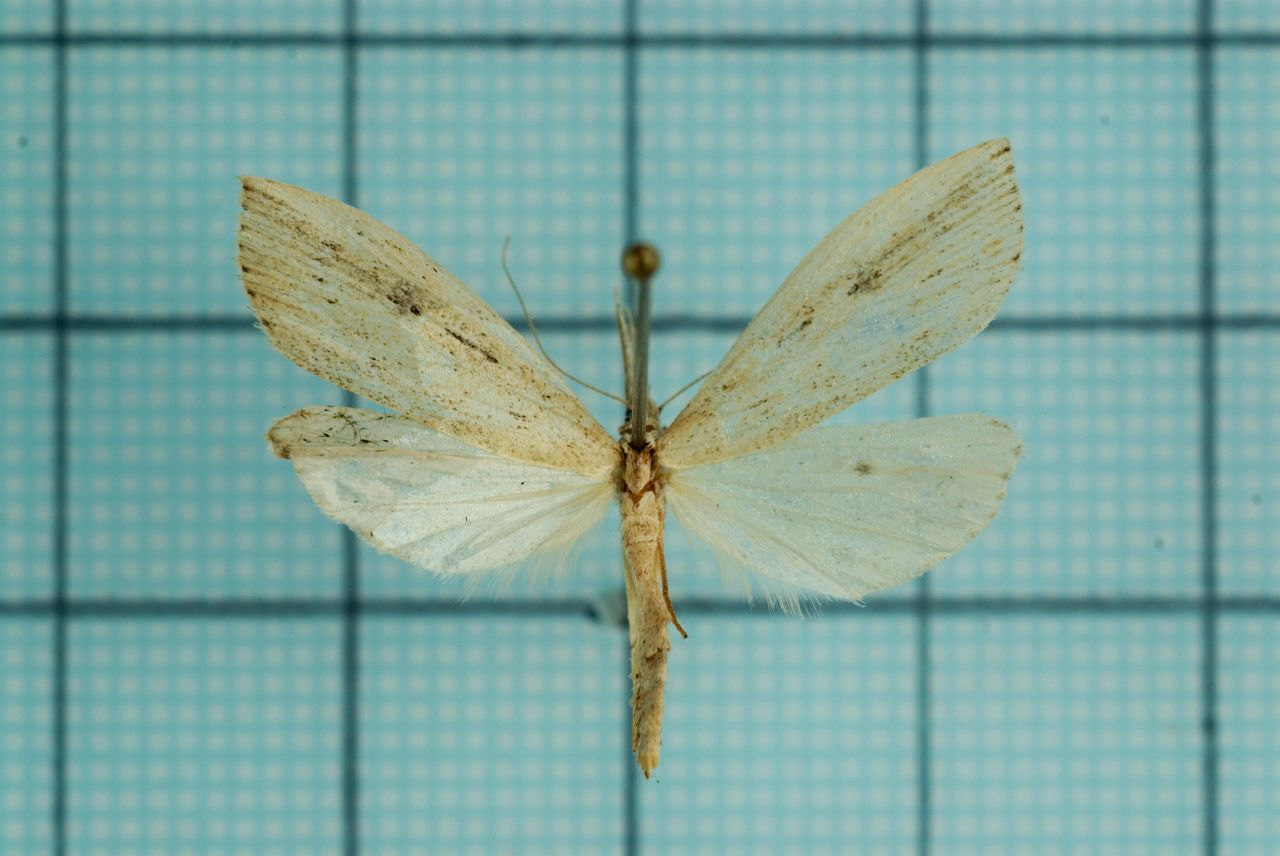

Scientific classification
- Kingdom: Animalia
- Phylum: Arthropoda
- Class: Insecta
- Order: Lepidoptera
- Superfamily: Noctuoidea
- Family: Erebidae
- Genus: Hypena
- Species: H. longipennis

Binomial name
- Hypena longipennis Walker, 1866

= Hypena longipennis =

Species of moth

Hypena longipennis is a moth in the family Erebidae first described by Francis Walker in 1866. It is found in India, China and Taiwan.

The wingspan is 34–39 mm.
