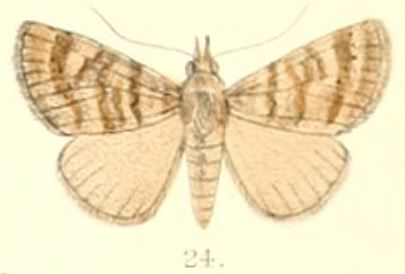

Scientific classification
- Domain: Eukaryota
- Kingdom: Animalia
- Phylum: Arthropoda
- Class: Insecta
- Order: Lepidoptera
- Superfamily: Noctuoidea
- Family: Erebidae
- Genus: Hypena
- Species: H. denticulata

Binomial name
- Hypena denticulata (Moore, 1882)

Synonyms
- Apanda denticulata Moore, 1882; Apanda dentilineata Moore, 1882 (missp.); Hypena dentilineata

= Hypena denticulata =

Species of moth

Hypena denticulata is a moth of the family Erebidae first described by Frederic Moore in 1882. It is found in Darjeeling, India.

Its wingspan is about 33 mm.
