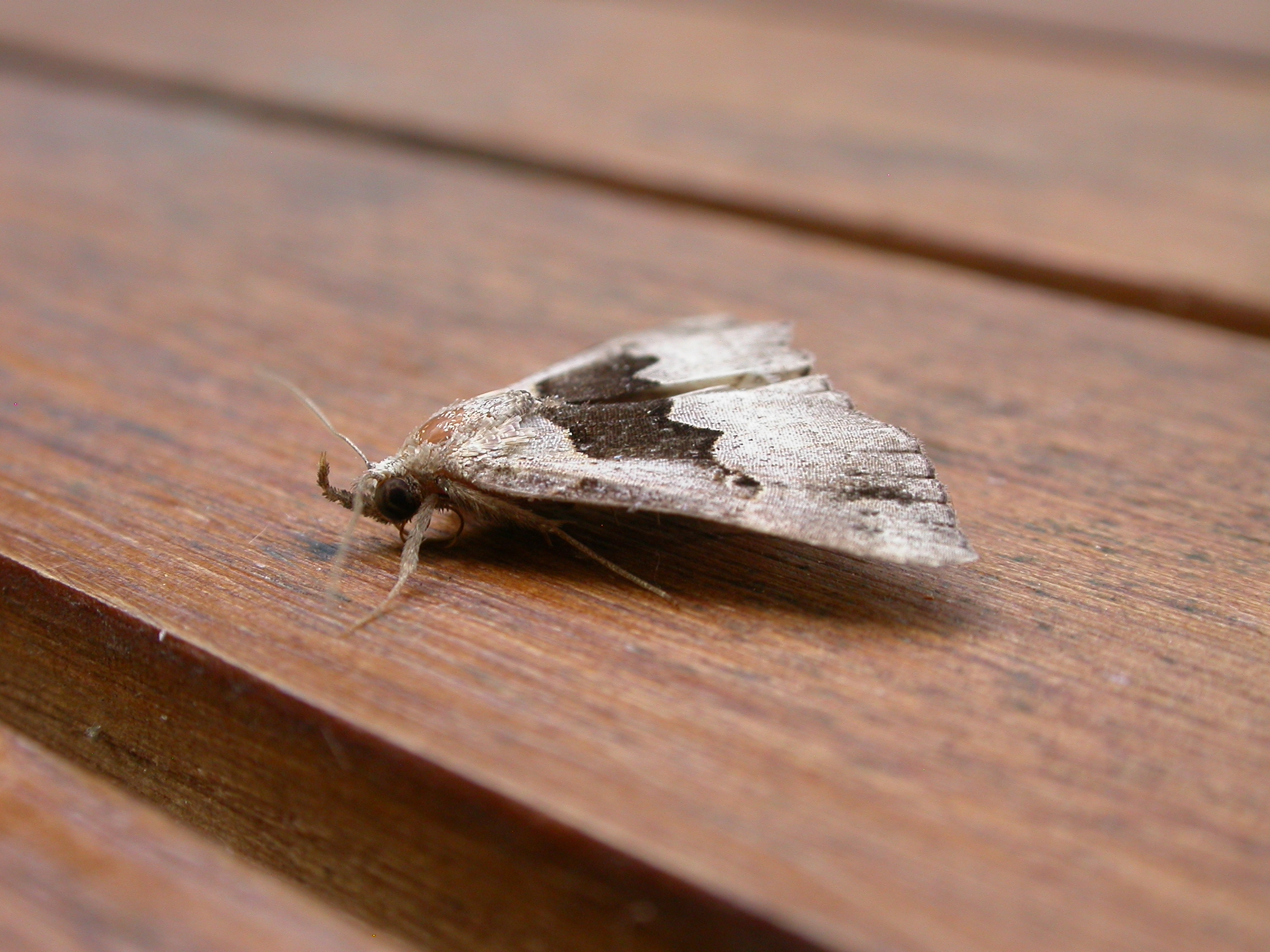

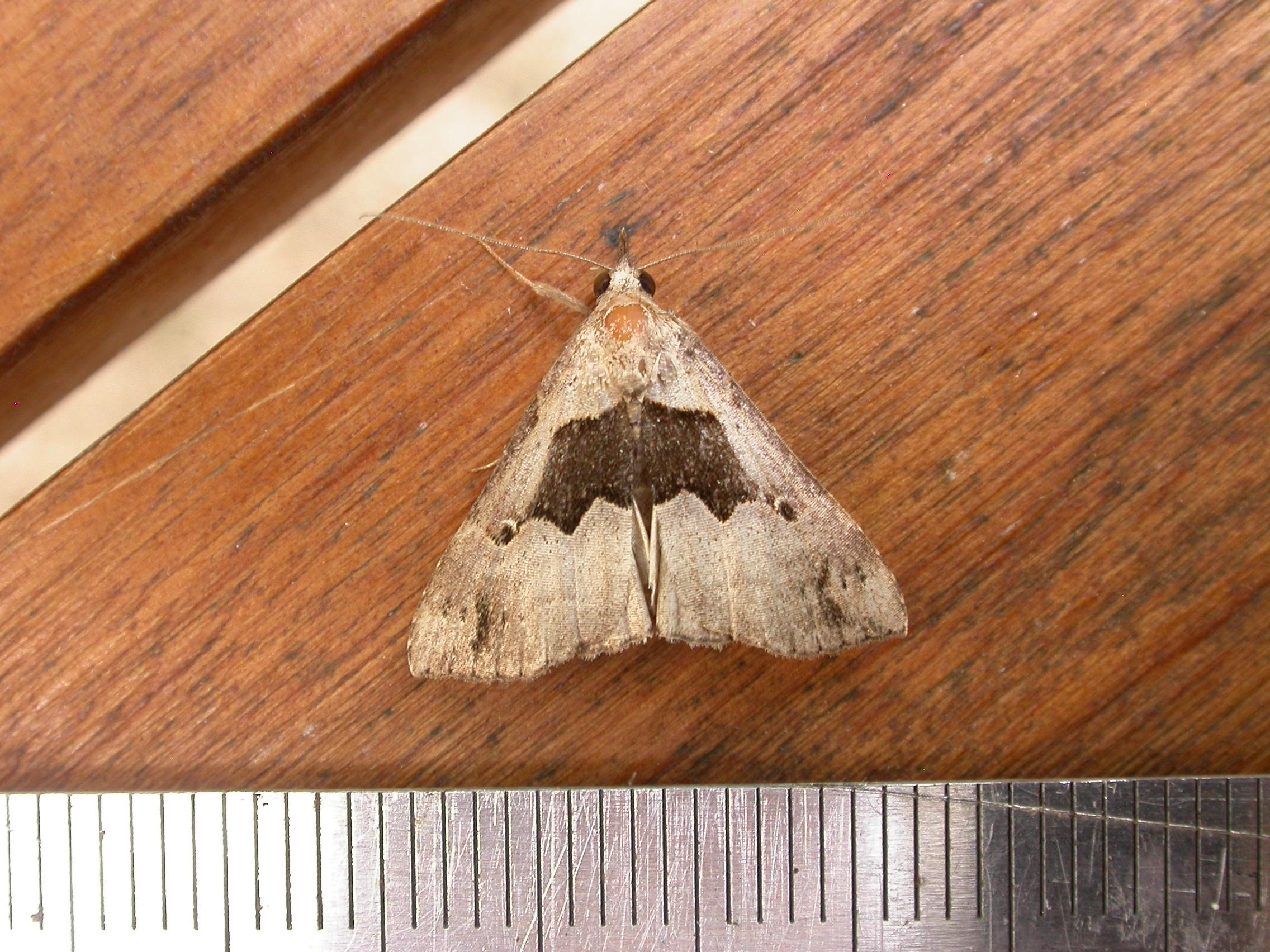

Scientific classification
- Kingdom: Animalia
- Phylum: Arthropoda
- Class: Insecta
- Order: Lepidoptera
- Superfamily: Noctuoidea
- Family: Erebidae
- Genus: Hypena
- Species: H. gonospilalis

Binomial name
- Hypena gonospilalis Walker, [1866]

Synonyms
- Hypena medioexcisa Rothschild, 1915; Hypena ganospilalis Rothschild, 1915

= Hypena gonospilalis =

Species of moth

Hypena gonospilalis is a species of moth of the family Erebidae first described by Francis Walker in 1866. It is found across the South Pacific, including the Cook Islands, Japan and Taiwan as well as the Australian state of Queensland.
