= Trichypena =

Scientific classification
- Domain: Eukaryota
- Kingdom: Animalia
- Phylum: Arthropoda
- Class: Insecta
- Order: Lepidoptera
- Superfamily: Noctuoidea
- Family: Erebidae
- Subfamily: Hypeninae
- Genus: Trichypena de Joannis, 1915

Genus of moths

Trichypena is a genus of moths of the family Noctuidae. The genus was erected by Joseph de Joannis in 1915.

Some species of this genus are:

- Trichypena malagasy (Viette, 1968)
- Trichypena quadra de Joannis, 1915

Trichypena may also be considered a synonym of Hypena Schrank, 1802.
