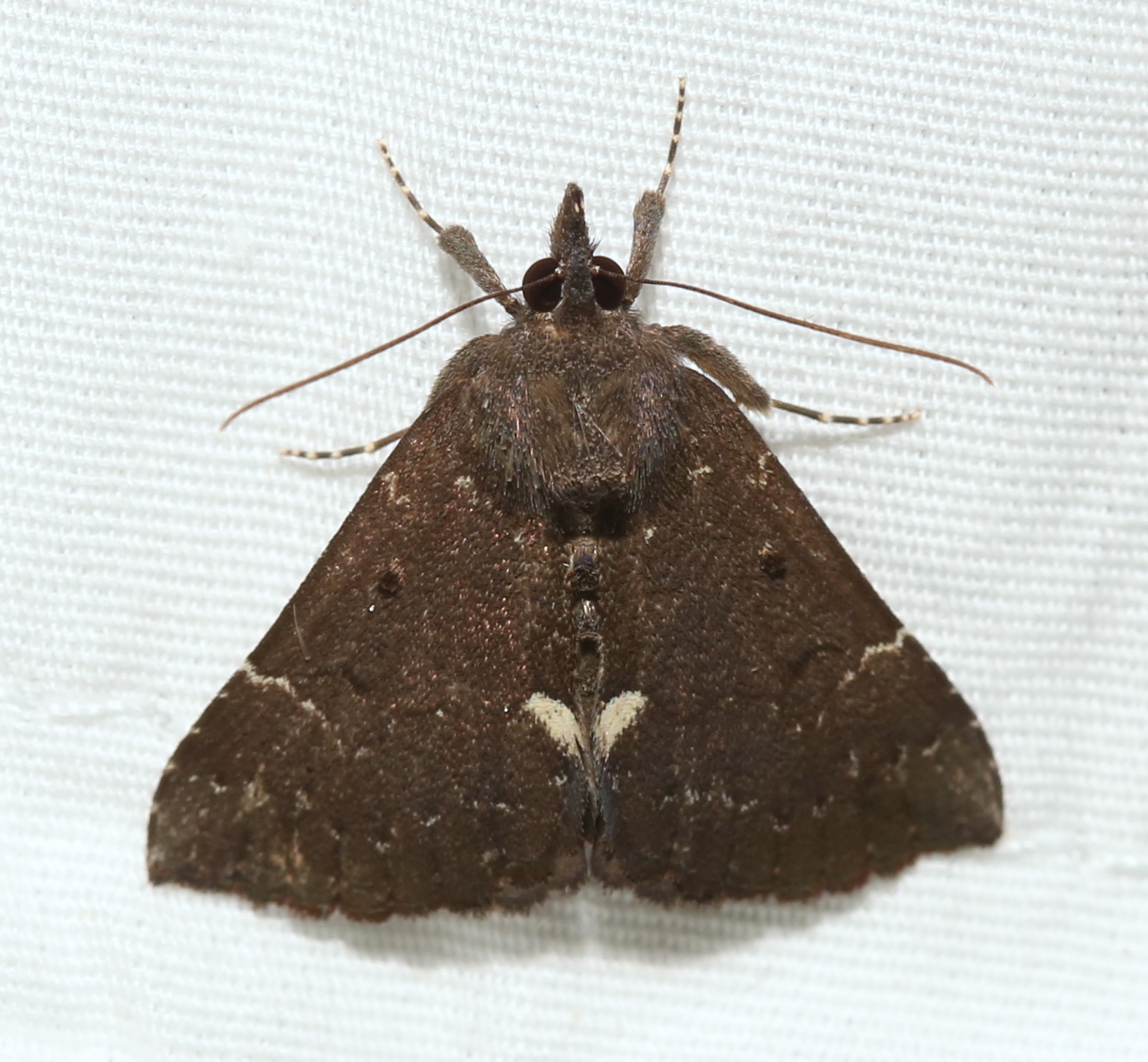
- Female
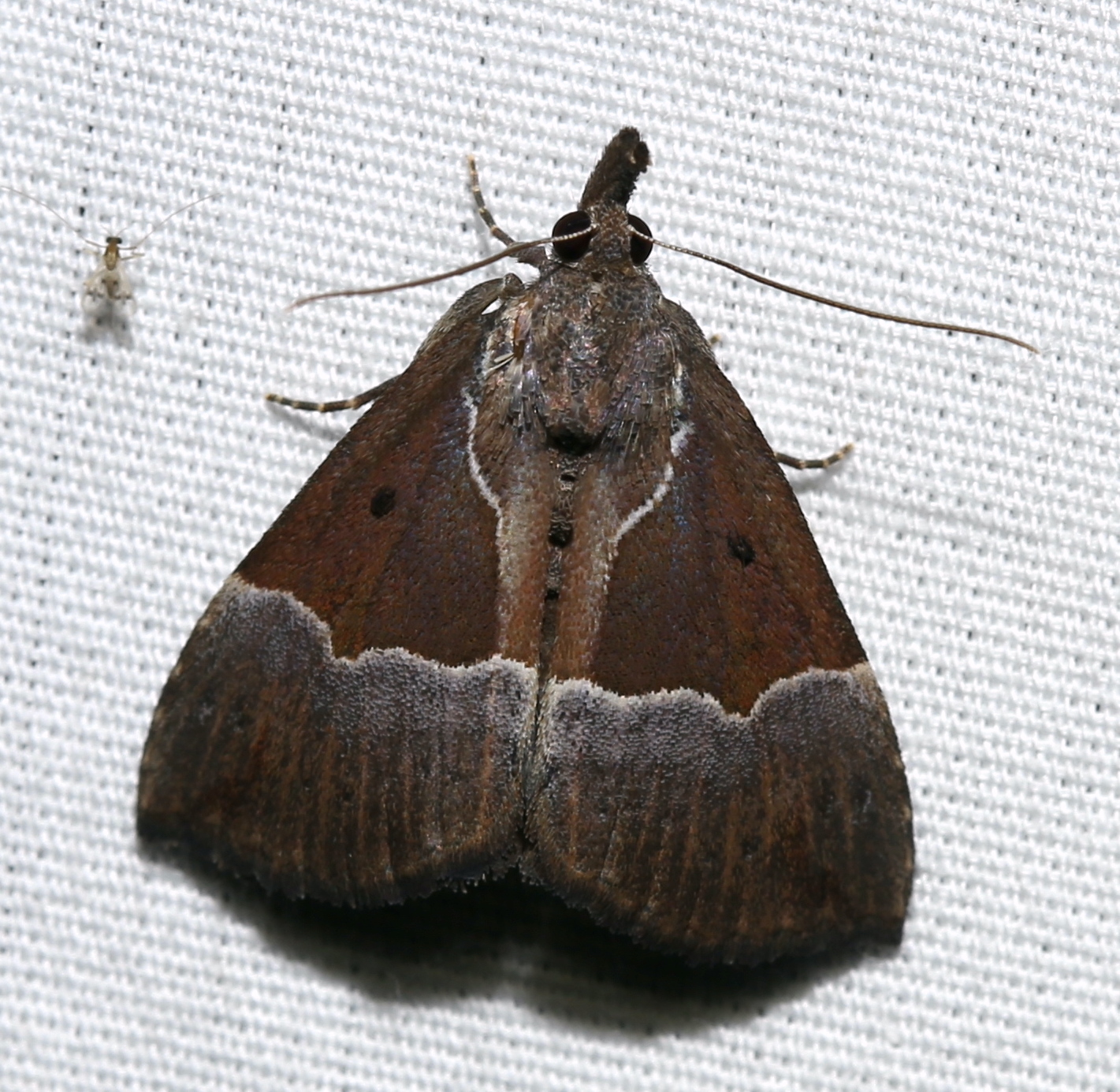
- Male

Scientific classification
- Kingdom: Animalia
- Phylum: Arthropoda
- Class: Insecta
- Order: Lepidoptera
- Superfamily: Noctuoidea
- Family: Erebidae
- Genus: Hypena
- Species: H. bijugalis

Binomial name
- Hypena bijugalis Walker, 1859

Synonyms
- Bomolocha bijugalis; Hypena toreuta; Hypena internalis; Hypena albisignalis; Hypena pallialis; Bomolocha fecialis

= Hypena bijugalis =

Species of moth

Hypena bijugalis, the dimorphic bomolocha, dimorphic hypena or toothed snout-moth, is a moth of the family Erebidae. The species was first described by Francis Walker in 1859. It is found in North America from Nova Scotia across southern Canada to Vancouver Island, south over the whole United States to Florida.

The wingspan is 24–31 mm. The moth flies from April to September depending on the location. There are two generations in much of the east. More generations southward.

The larvae feed on Cornus sericea and perhaps other Cornus species.
