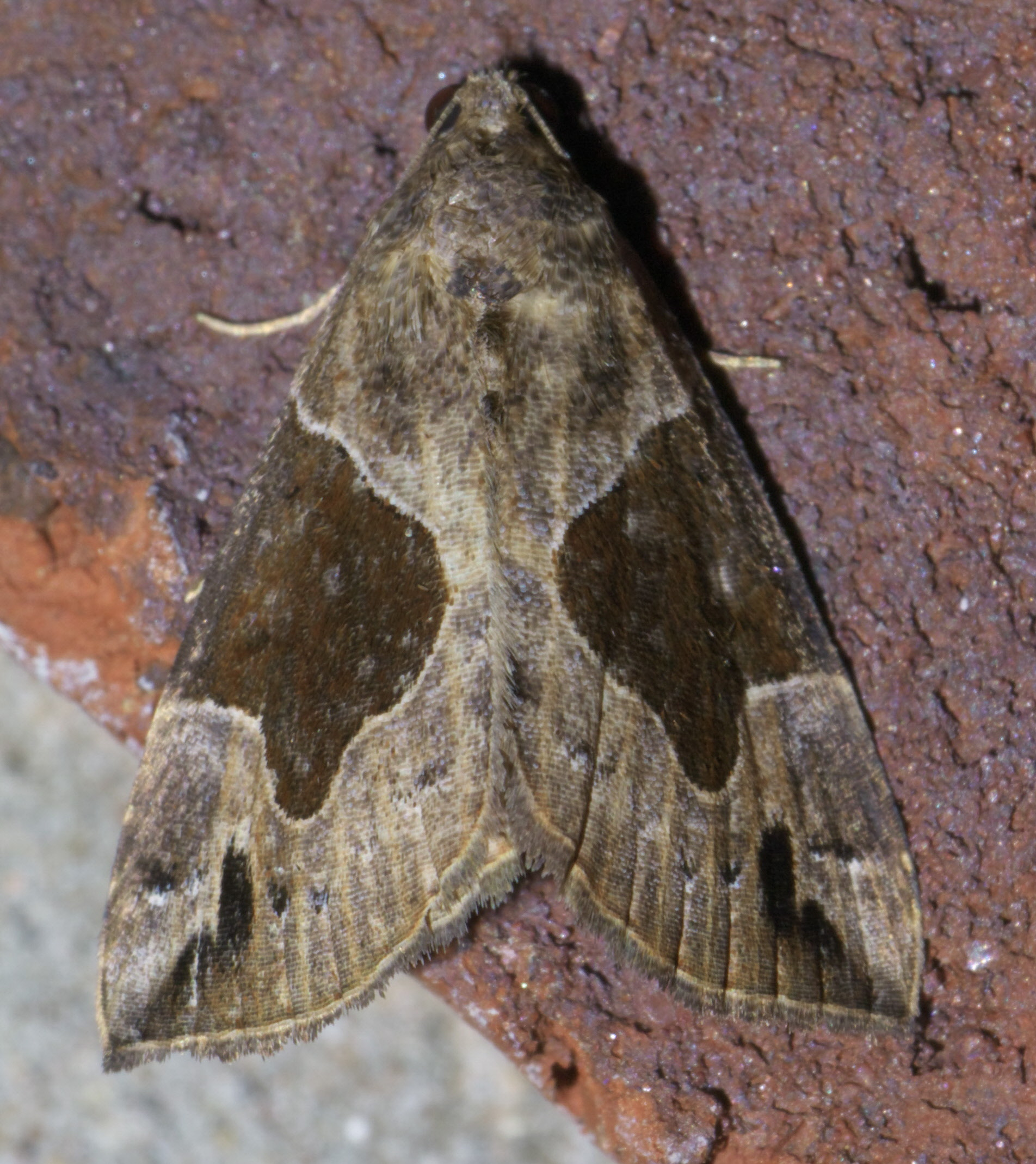
- Hypena manalis

Scientific classification
- Kingdom: Animalia
- Phylum: Arthropoda
- Class: Insecta
- Order: Lepidoptera
- Superfamily: Noctuoidea
- Family: Erebidae
- Genus: Hypena
- Species: H. manalis

Binomial name
- Hypena manalis Walker, 1859

Synonyms
- Bomolocha manalis

= Hypena manalis =

Species of moth

Hypena manalis, the flowing-line hypena, is a moth of the family Erebidae. It is found from Minnesota to Nova Scotia, south to Florida and Texas.

The wingspan is 23–28 mm. The moth flies from May to September in the south and from June to August in the north. There two to three generations per year.

The larvae feed on false nettle, but have also been reared on dandelion and on dock.
