= Hypena degesalis =

Scientific classification
- Kingdom: Animalia
- Phylum: Arthropoda
- Class: Insecta
- Order: Lepidoptera
- Superfamily: Noctuoidea
- Family: Erebidae
- Genus: Hypena
- Species: H. degesalis

Binomial name
- Hypena degesalis Walker, 1859

Species of moth

Hypena degesalis is a species of moth in the family Erebidae. It is found in North America.

The MONA or Hodges number for Hypena degesalis is 8459.

The Phylogenetic Sequence is 930582 (Pohl, et al., 2016) .
