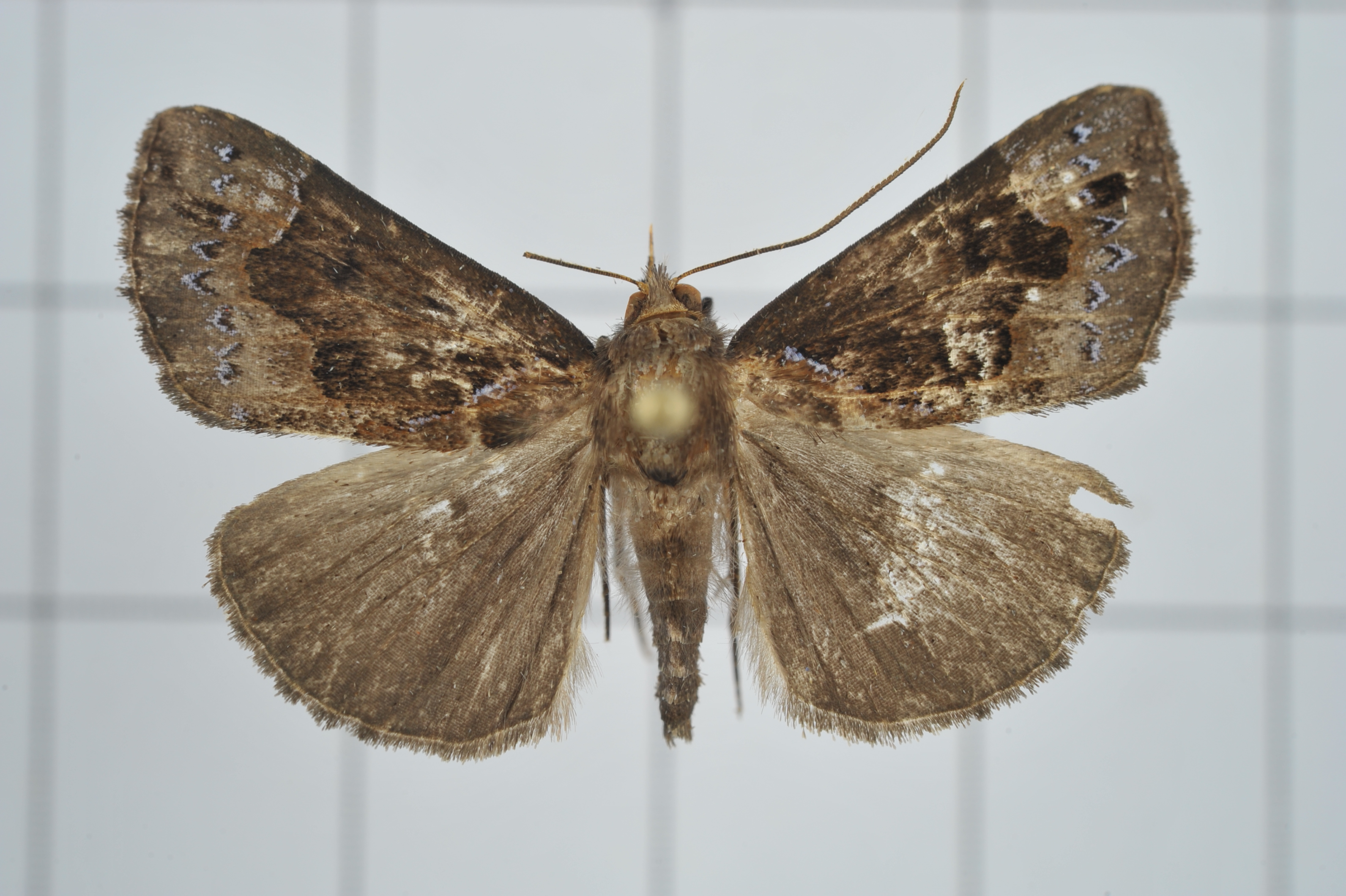

Scientific classification
- Kingdom: Animalia
- Phylum: Arthropoda
- Class: Insecta
- Order: Lepidoptera
- Superfamily: Noctuoidea
- Family: Erebidae
- Genus: Hypena
- Species: H. cyanea

Binomial name
- Hypena cyanea (Hampson, 1893)

Synonyms
- Bomolocha cyanea Hampson, 1893

= Hypena cyanea =

Species of moth

Hypena cyanea, is a moth of the family Erebidae first described by George Hampson in 1893. It is found in Sri Lanka.
