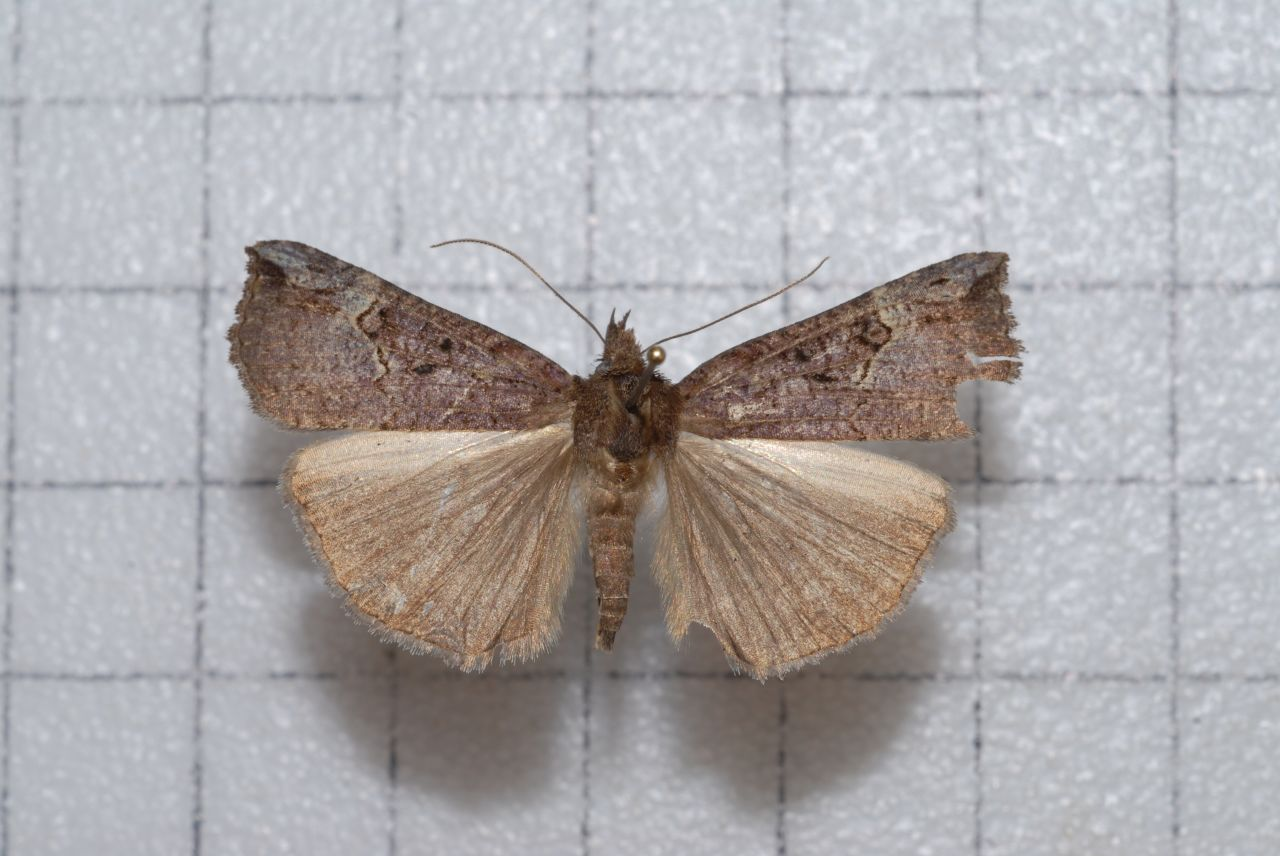

Scientific classification
- Domain: Eukaryota
- Kingdom: Animalia
- Phylum: Arthropoda
- Class: Insecta
- Order: Lepidoptera
- Superfamily: Noctuoidea
- Family: Erebidae
- Genus: Hypena
- Species: H. tristalis

Binomial name
- Hypena tristalis Lederer, 1853

Synonyms
- Bomolocha nigrescens Draeseke, 1928; Hypena tripunctalis Bremer, 1864

= Hypena tristalis =

Species of moth

Hypena tristalis is a moth in the family Erebidae. It is found in the Russian Far East, Korea, Japan and Taiwan.

The wingspan is 33–40 mm.
