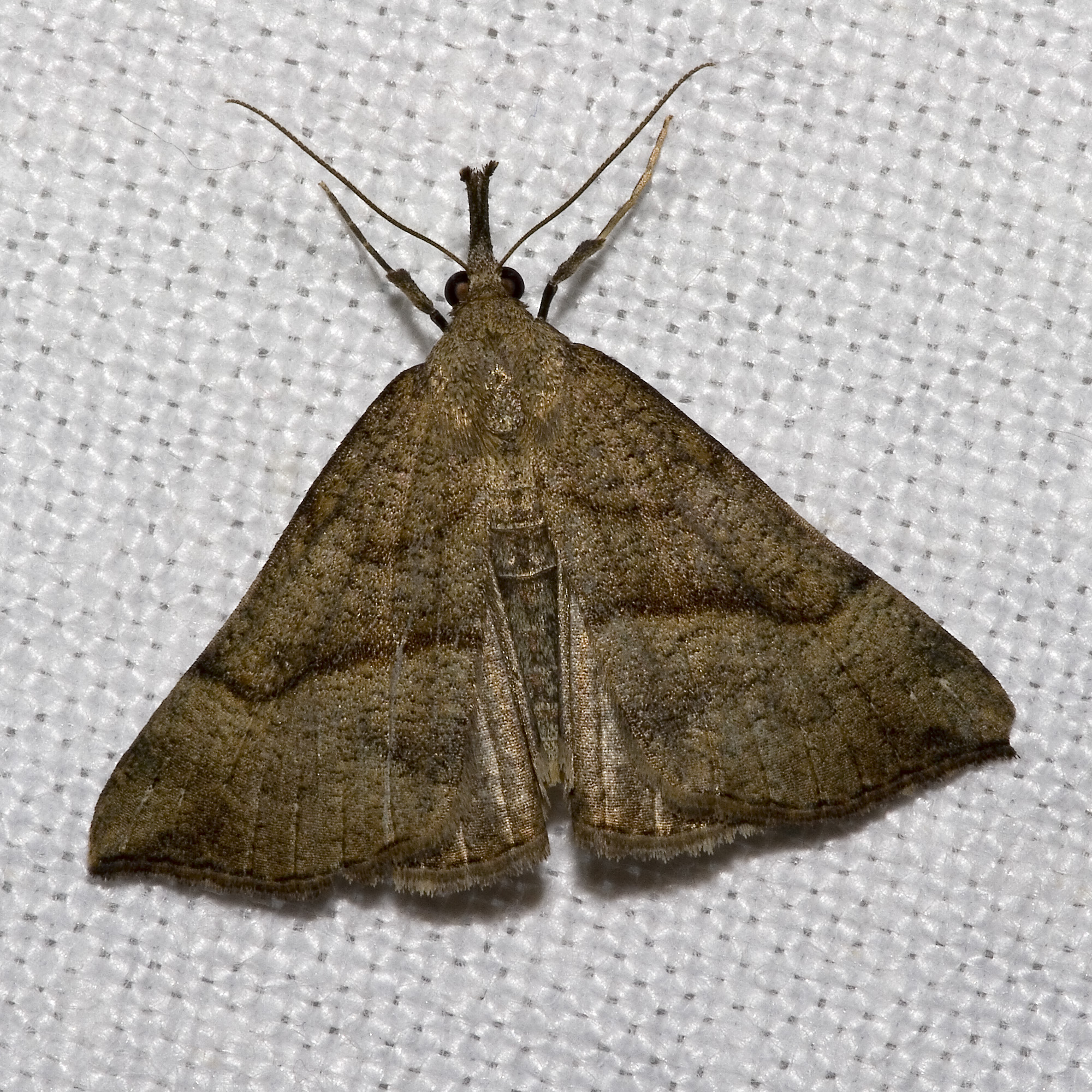
- Hypena proboscidalis

Scientific classification
- Kingdom: Animalia
- Phylum: Arthropoda
- Clade: Pancrustacea
- Class: Insecta
- Order: Lepidoptera
- Superfamily: Noctuoidea
- Family: Erebidae
- Subfamily: Hypeninae
- Genus: Hypena; Schrank, 1802

Synonyms
- Erichila Billberg, 1820; Herpyzon Hübner, 1822; Bomolocha Hübner, [1825]; Ophiuche Hübner, [1825]; Badausa Walker, [1863]; Peliala Walker, 1865; Phanaspa Walker, [1866]; Plathypena Grote, 1873; Euhypena Grote, 1873; Lomanaltes Grote, 1873; Meghypena Grote, 1873; Macrhypena Grote, 1873; Mathura Moore, 1882; Apanda Moore, 1882; Hypoepa Leech, 1889; Nesamiptis Meyrick, 1899; Tomyris H. Druce, 1890; Anepischetos J. B. Smith, 1900; Ogoas H. Druce, 1890; Trichypena de Joannis, 1915; Rowdenia Nye, 1975; Jussalypena Lödl, 1994; Tetrastictypena Lödl, 1994; Extremypena Lödl, 1994; Biangulypena Lödl, 1994; Conscitalypena Lödl, 1994; Pseudodichromia Lödl, 1994; Obesypena Beck, 1996; Rosthypena Beck, 1996

= Hypena =

Genus of moths

Hypena is a genus of moths in the family Erebidae. It was first described by Franz von Paula Schrank in 1802. These non-migratory moths overwinter as pupae and almost never estivate as adults.

== Taxonomy ==
The genus includes the former Bomolocha species.

== Description ==
Antennae minutely ciliated in male. An acute frontal tuft present. Thorax smoothly scaled. Abdomen with dorsal tufts. Mid and hind tibia slightly hairy. Forewings with acute and depressed apex.

== Selected species ==
The following species are included in the genus. The lists may be incomplete.

=== Extant ===
- Hypena abalienalis (Walker, 1859) – white-lined hypena moth, white-lined bomolocha moth
- Hypena abyssinalis (Guénée, 1854)
- Hypena abyssinialis (Guénée, 1854)
- Hypena albopunctalis (Leech, 1889)
- Hypena amica (Bulter, 1878)
- Hypena angustalis (Warren, 1913)
- Hypena annulalis (Grote, 1876)
- Hypena appalachiensis (Butler, 1987)
- Hypena assimilis (Hampson, 1891)
- Hypena atomaria (Smith, 1903)
- Hypena baltimoralis (Guénée, 1854) – Baltimore bomolocha moth or Baltimore hypena moth
- Hypena bijugalis (Walker, 1859) – dimorphic bomolocha moth, dimorphic hypena moth, or toothed snout moth
- Hypena californica (Behr, 1870)
- Hypena colombana (Moore, [1885])
- Hypena conscitalis (Walker, 1866)
- Hypena cowani (Viette, 1968)
- Hypena crassalis (Fabricius, 1787) – beautiful snout moth
- Hypena cruca (Strand, 1920)
- Hypena cyanea (Hampson, 1893)
- Hypena deceptalis (Walker, 1859) – deceptive hypena moth
- Hypena decorata (J. B. Smith, 1884)
- Hypena degesalis (Walker, 1859)
- Hypena denticulata (Moore, 1882)
- Hypena depalpis Strand, 1920
- Hypena desquamata (Strand, 1920)
- Hypena dichromialis (Strand, 1920)
- Hypena ducalis (Schaus & Clemens, 1893)
- Hypena edictalis (Walker, 1859) – large bomolocha moth
- Hypena eductalis (Walker, 1859)
- Hypena erikae (Lödl, 1994)
- Hypena euryzostra (Turner, 1932)
- Hypena extensa (Walker, [1866])
- Hypena furva (Wileman, 1911)
- Hypena fuscomaculalis (Saalmüller, 1880)
- Hypena gonospilalis (Walker, 1866)
- Hypena griseapex (Hampson, 1891)
- Hypena griveaudi (Viette, 1968)
- Hypena gypsospila (Turner, 1903)
- Hypena hemiphaea de Joannis, 1915
- Hypena heuloa (Smith, 1905)
- Hypena hoareae (Holloway, 1977)
- Hypena humuli (Harris, 1841) – hop looper moth or hop vine moth
- Hypena iconicalis (Walker, 1859)
- Hypena incognata (Bethune-Baker, 1908)
- Hypena indicatalis (Walker, 1859)
- Hypena indistincta (Wileman, 1915)
- Hypena isogona (Meyrick, 1889)
- Hypena jocosalis (Walker, [1859])
- Hypena jusssalis (Walker, 1859)
- Hypena kanshireiensis (Wileman, 1916)
- Hypena kingdoni (Viette, 1968)
- Hypena labatalis (Walker, 1859)
- Hypena laceratalis (Walker, 1859) – lantana defoliator moth
- Hypena lignealis (Walker, 1866)
- Hypena lividalis (Hübner, 1796)
- Hypena longipennis (Walker, 1866)
- Hypena madefactalis (Guénée, 1854) – gray-edged hypena moth or gray-eyed bomolocha moth
- Hypena malagasy (Viette, 1968)
- Hypena manalis (Walker, 1859) – flowing-line hypena moth
- Hypena mandatalis (Walker, 1859)
- Hypena minualis (Guénée, 1854) – sooty bomolocha moth
- Hypena modestoides (Poole, 1989) (=Hypena modesta (J. B. Smith, 1895))
- Hypena molpusalis (Walker, 1859)
- Hypena munitalis (Mann, 1861)
- Hypena namaqualis (Guenée, 1854)
- Hypena napa (Strand, 1920)
- Hypena napana (Strand, 1920)
- Hypena nasutalis (Guenée, 1854)
- Hypena neoeductalis (Lafontaine & Schmidt, 2010) (=Hypena (Bomolocha) eductalis Hampson, 1895)
- Hypena neoplyta (Prout, 1925)
- Hypena obacerralis (Walker, 1859)
- Hypena obesalis (Treitschke, 1828) – Paignton snout moth
- Hypena obfuscalis (Hampson, 1893)
- Hypena obsitalis (Hübner, 1813) – Bloxworth snout moth
- Hypena obsoleta (Butler, 1877)
- Hypena occata (Hampson, 1882)
- Hypena ophiusinalis (Mabille, 1879)
- Hypena ophiusoides (Moore, 1882)
- Hypena opulenta (Christoph, 1877)
- Hypena orthographa (Turner, 1932)
- Hypena palpalis (Hübner, 1796)
- Hypena palparia (Walker, 1861) – variegated snout moth or mottled bomolocha moth
- Hypena parva (Wileman, 1916)
- Hypena pelodes (Turner, 1932)
- Hypena perspicua (Leech, 1900)
- Hypena peterseni (Strand, 1920)
- Hypena poa (Strand, 1920)
- Hypena polycyma (Hampson, 1902)
- Hypena porrectalis (Fabricius, 1794)
- Hypena proboscidalis (Linnaeus, 1758) – snout moth
- Hypena quaesitalis (Walker, 1859)
- Hypena ramstadtii (Wyatt, 1967)
- Hypena rostralis (Linnaeus, 1758) – buttoned snout moth
- Hypena sabinis (Lödl, 1994)
- Hypena saltalis (Schaus & Clemens, 1893)
- Hypena satsumalis Leech, 1889
- Hypena scabra (Fabricius, 1798) – green cloverworm moth or black snout moth
- Hypena simplex (Lucas, 1895)
- Hypena sinuosa (Wileman, 1911)
- Hypena sordidula (Grote, 1872) – sordid hypena moth
- Hypena strigata (Fabricius)
- Hypena strigatus (Fabricius, 1798)
- Hypena striolalis (Aurivillius, 1910)
- Hypena subcyanea (Butler, 1881)
- Hypena subidalis (Guenée, 1854)
- Hypena subvittalis (Walker, 1866)
- Hypena sylpha (Butler, 1887)
- Hypena taiwana (Wileman, 1915)
- Hypena tenebralis (Strand, 1920)
- Hypena toyi (Viette, 1968)
- Hypena trigonalis (Guenee, 1854)
- Hypena tristalis (Lederer, 1853)
- Hypena umbralis (Smith, 1884)
- Hypena variabilis (Druce, 1890)
- Hypena varialis (Walker, 1866)
- Hypena vega (Smith, 1900)
- Hypena veronikae (Lödl, 1994)
- Hypena verticalis (Hampson, 1910)
- Hypena vestita (Moore, [1885])
- Hypena vetustalis (Guénée, 1854)
- Hypena zillana (Strand, 1920)

Species brought into synonymy

- Hypena masurialis: synonym of Rhynchina obliqualis (Kollar, 1844)
- Hypena obliqualis: synonym of Rhynchina obliqualis (Kollar, 1844)
- Hypena sagitta: synonym of Dichromia sagitta (Fabricius, 1775)

=== Extinct ===
- Laysan dropseed noctuid moth (Hypena laysanensis)
- Hilo noctuid moth (Hypena newelli)
- Lovegrass noctuid moth (Hypena plagiota)
- Kaholuamano noctuid moth (Hypena senicula)
