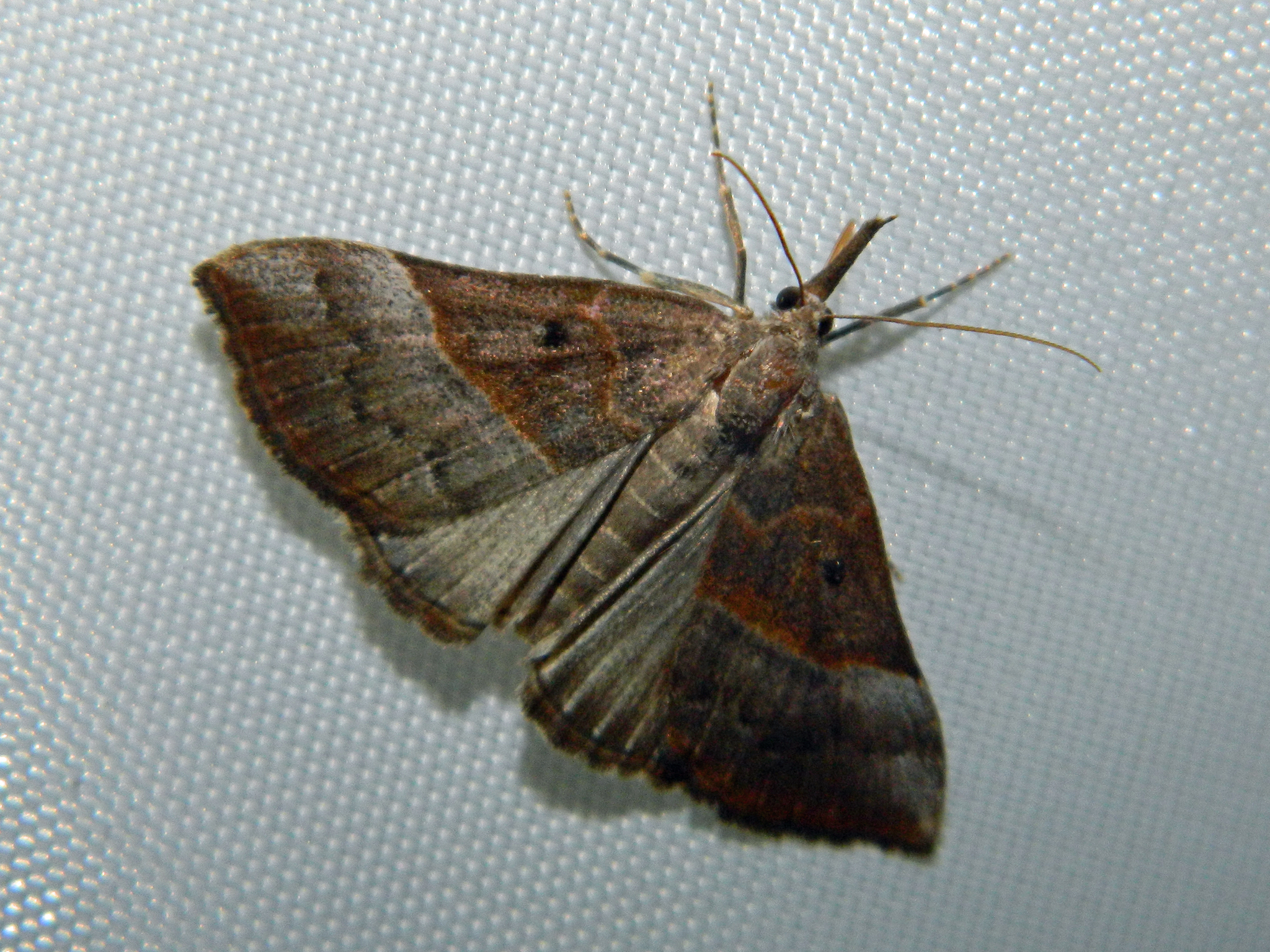

Scientific classification
- Kingdom: Animalia
- Phylum: Arthropoda
- Class: Insecta
- Order: Lepidoptera
- Superfamily: Noctuoidea
- Family: Erebidae
- Genus: Hypena
- Species: H. eductalis

Binomial name
- Hypena eductalis Walker, 1859

Synonyms
- Lomanaltes eductalis; Lomanaltes laetulus Grote, 1873

= Hypena eductalis =

Species of moth

Hypena eductalis, commonly known as the red-footed snout, red-footed bomolocha moth, or alder smoke, is a species of moth in the family Noctuidae. The species was first described by Francis Walker in 1859. It is found in North America from Saskatchewan to Nova Scotia and south to Florida and Texas.

The species was formerly placed in a separate genus, Lomanaltes which is now considered as a synonym of the genus Hypena.

The wingspan is about 25 mm. There are two generations per year in much of the eastern part of its range.

The larvae feed on the underside of the leaves of alder.
