= Extremypena =

Scientific classification
- Domain: Eukaryota
- Kingdom: Animalia
- Phylum: Arthropoda
- Class: Insecta
- Order: Lepidoptera
- Superfamily: Noctuoidea
- Family: Erebidae
- Subfamily: Hypeninae
- Genus: Extremypena; Lödl, 1994

Genus of moths

Extremypena is a genus of moths of the family Erebidae. The genus was erected by Martin Lödl in 1994.

== Species ==
The genus includes the following species:

- Extremypena extremipalpis
- Extremypena subvittalis

Extremypena may also be considered a synonym of Hypena Schrank, 1802.
