= Hypena hemiphaea =

Scientific classification
- Kingdom: Animalia
- Phylum: Arthropoda
- Class: Insecta
- Order: Lepidoptera
- Superfamily: Noctuoidea
- Family: Erebidae
- Genus: Hypena
- Species: H. hemiphaea

Binomial name
- Hypena hemiphaea de Joannis, 1915

Species of moth

Hypena hemiphaea is a moth of the family Noctuidae. It is found on Mauritius.

It has a wingspan of 29 mm (1.1 in).
