= Hypena quaesitalis =

Scientific classification
- Kingdom: Animalia
- Phylum: Arthropoda
- Class: Insecta
- Order: Lepidoptera
- Superfamily: Noctuoidea
- Family: Erebidae
- Genus: Hypena
- Species: H. quaesitalis

Binomial name
- Hypena quaesitalis Walker, 1859

Species of moth

Hypena quaesitalis is a moth of the family Erebidae first described by Francis Walker in 1859. It is found in Sri Lanka.
