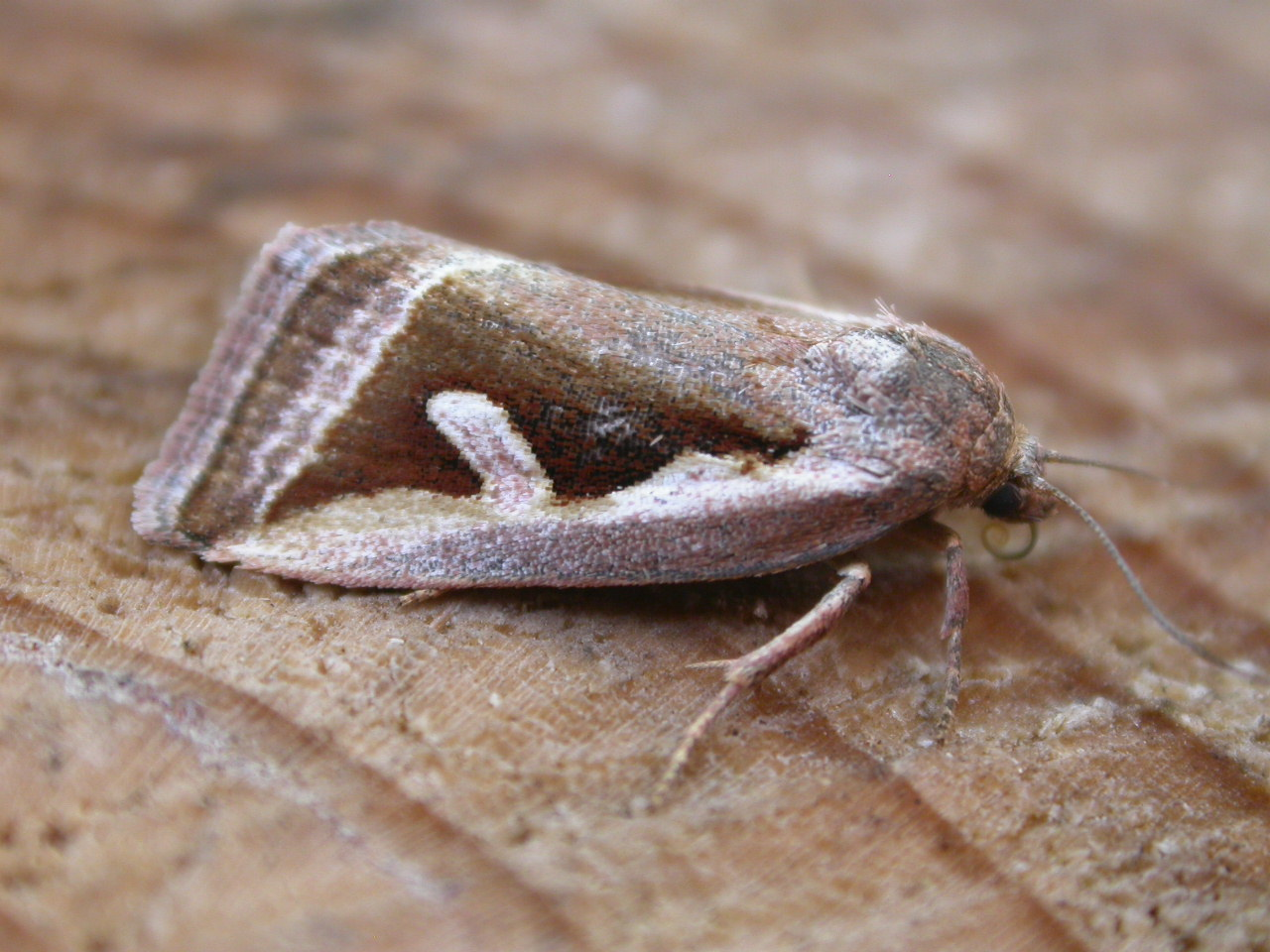
- L. uncula

Scientific classification
- Kingdom: Animalia
- Phylum: Arthropoda
- Clade: Pancrustacea
- Class: Insecta
- Order: Lepidoptera
- Superfamily: Noctuoidea
- Family: Noctuidae
- Subfamily: Eustrotiinae
- Genus: Lithacodia; Hübner, 1818

Synonyms
- Anchiroe; Ausava; Motama

= Lithacodia =

Genus of moths

Lithacodia is a genus of moths of the family Noctuidae.

== Species ==
- Lithacodia albannularis Berio 1954
- Lithacodia albiclava Draudt 1950
- Lithacodia albitornata Berio 1973
- Lithacodia albopunctalis (Druce 1895)
- Lithacodia altitudinis Berio 1973
- Lithacodia armilla (Saalmuller 1891)
- Lithacodia atrinotata Hampson 1910
- Lithacodia aurata (Moore 1882)
- Lithacodia awassensis Berio 1984
- Lithacodia benita (Schaus 1904)
- Lithacodia biaccentuata Berio 1973
- Lithacodia binorbis (Hampson 1902)
- Lithacodia bitrigonophora Berio 1973
- Lithacodia bryistis (Turner 1902)
- Lithacodia caffristis Hampson 1910
- Lithacodia chloromixta (Alpheraky 1892)
- Lithacodia chlorophila Hampson 1910
- Lithacodia cidarioides (Moore 1882)
- Lithacodia clandestina (Turner 1909)
- Lithacodia confusa (Leech 1900)
- Lithacodia costaricana Franclemont &Todd 1983
- Lithacodia crotopha (Swinhoe 1905)
- Lithacodia cuprea (Schaus 1898)
- Lithacodia cupreofusca Hampson 1910
- Lithacodia cupreofuscoides Berio 1954
- Lithacodia deceptoria (Scopoli 1763)
- Lithacodia decorata (Moore 1882)
- Lithacodia decorina Berio 1954
- Lithacodia delicatula (Christoph 1882)
- Lithacodia digitalis Berio 1977
- Lithacodia dorata (Hampson 1902)
- Lithacodia editha (Schaus 1904)
- Lithacodia elaeostygia Sugi 1982
- Lithacodia euchroa Hampson 1910
- Lithacodia externa Berio 1977
- Lithacodia fentoni (Butler 1881)
- Lithacodia flavofimbria (Saalmuller 1891)
- Lithacodia folium Schaus 1914
- Lithacodia geoga (Schaus 1906)
- Lithacodia glaucopis (Hampson 1894)
- Lithacodia gracilior Draudt 1950
- Lithacodia griseifusa Hampson 1914
- Lithacodia griseomixta (Hampson 1900)
- Lithacodia holophaea Hampson 1910
- Lithacodia homopteridia Schaus 1911
- Lithacodia idiostygia (Sugi 1958)
- Lithacodia indeterminata Barnes&McDunnough 1918
- Lithacodia jora Schaus 1911
- Lithacodia larentiformis (Hampson 1894)
- Lithacodia larentioides Strand 1920
- Lithacodia mabillei Berio 1954
- Lithacodia macrouncina Berio 1977
- Lithacodia mandarina (Leech 1900)
- Lithacodia martynovi (Tschetverikov 1904)
- Lithacodia melanostigma (Hampson 1894)
- Lithacodia mella (Schaus 1894)
- Lithacodia merta (Schaus 1901)
- Lithacodia mesomela Hampson 1914
- Lithacodia mesophoenica Dognin 1914
- Lithacodia mesoplaga Hampson 1914
- Lithacodia metachrysa Hampson 1910
- Lithacodia micronephra Hampson 1910
- Lithacodia minuta (Druce 1889)
- Lithacodia minutipuncta Berio 1973
- Lithacodia mirella (Schaus 1904)
- Lithacodia monorbis Berio 1960
- Lithacodia muscosula (Guenee 1852)
- Lithacodia mustapha Dyar 1912
- Lithacodia mysteriosa Berio 1954
- Lithacodia nemorum (Oberthur 1880)
- Lithacodia nivata (Leech 1900)
- Lithacodia normalis Hampson 1910
- Lithacodia octogintaocto Berio 1977
- Lithacodia olivella Draudt 1950
- Lithacodia onytes (Schaus 1894)
- Lithacodia penthis (Schaus 1904)
- Lithacodia persubtilis Berio 1984
- Lithacodia phya (Druce 1889)
- Lithacodia picatina Prout 1921
- Lithacodia picta (Hampson 1896)
- Lithacodia plumbifusa Hampson 1914
- Lithacodia polita Berio 1973
- Lithacodia postivitta Wileman 1914
- Lithacodia potens Holloway 1976
- Lithacodia praeapicilinea Berio 1964
- Lithacodia pyrophora Hampson 1914
- Lithacodia quadriorbis Berio 1977
- Lithacodia roseopicta Warren 1913
- Lithacodia rubrilis Berio 1954
- Lithacodia ruvida Berio 1977
- Lithacodia scapha (Saalmuller 1891)
- Lithacodia shansiensis Berio 1977
- Lithacodia sirbena Dognin 1914
- Lithacodia squalida (Leech 1889)
- Lithacodia stygia (Butler 1878)
- Lithacodia stygiodes (Sugi 1958)
- Lithacodia substellata Dyar 1918
- Lithacodia superior Draudt 1950
- Lithacodia syggenes Hampson 1910
- Lithacodia taiwana Wileman 1915
- Lithacodia tetratrigona Berio 1973
- Lithacodia trifurca Berio 1977
- Lithacodia triocellata Berio 1964
- Lithacodia uncula Clerck, 1759
- Lithacodia unguapicata Berio 1977
- Lithacodia varicolora (Hampson 1902)
- Lithacodia variicolor Le Cerf 1922
- Lithacodia varioplagata Berio 1954
- Lithacodia veternosa Schaus 1911
- Lithacodia vexillifera Berio 1977
- Lithacodia viridovata Berio 1973
- Lithacodia walta (Schaus 1904)
- Lithacodia wiskotti (Staudinger 1888)
- Lithacodia xemiloca Dyar 1924

Species brought into synonymy

- Lithacodia blandula: synonym of Maliattha blandula (Guenée, 1862)
- Lithacodia brunnea: synonym of Pseudodeltote brunnea (Leech 1889)
- Lithacodia coenia: synonym of Pseudodeltote coenia (Swinhoe 1901)
- Lithacodia distinguenda: synonym of Protodeltote distinguenda (Staudinger 1888)
- Lithacodia falsa: synonym of Koyaga falsa (Butler 1885)
- Lithacodia formosana: synonym of Pseudodeltote formosana (Hampson 1910)
- Lithacodia glauca: synonym of Deltote glauca (Hampson 1910)
- Lithacodia musta: synonym of Deltote musta (Grote & Robinson 1868)
- Lithacodia numisma: synonym of Koyaga numisma (Staudinger 1888)
- Lithacodia subcoenia: synonym of Pseudodeltote subcoenia Wileman & South 1916
- Lithacodia virescens: synonym of Koyaga virescens (Sugi 1958)
- Lithacodia viriditincta: synonym of Koyaga viriditincta (Wileman 1915)
