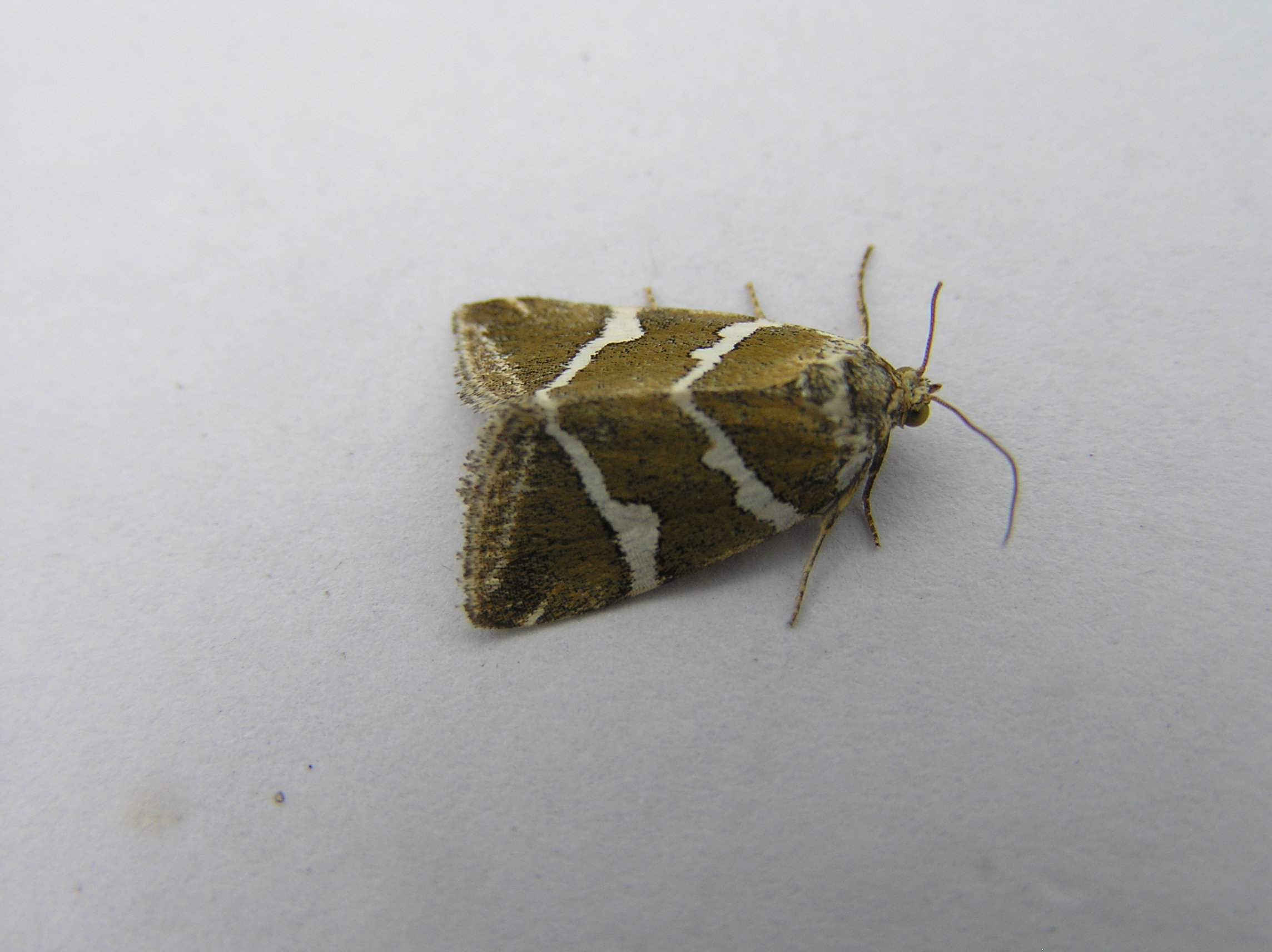
- Deltote bankiana

Scientific classification
- Domain: Eukaryota
- Kingdom: Animalia
- Phylum: Arthropoda
- Class: Insecta
- Order: Lepidoptera
- Superfamily: Noctuoidea
- Family: Noctuidae
- Subfamily: Eustrotiinae
- Genus: Deltote; Reichenbach, 1817

Synonyms
- Lithacodia Hübner, [1818]; Bankia Guenée, 1852; Erotylae Ochsenheimer, 1816; Erastria Ochsenheimer, 1816; Eustrotia Hübner, [1821]; Hemeroptena Sodoffsky, 1837; Hydrelia Guenée, 1841; Hyela Stephens, 1850; Motama Moore, 1882; Anchiroe Saalmüller, 1891

= Deltote =

Genus of moths

Deltote is a genus of moths of the family Noctuidae. The genus was described by Reichenbach in 1817.

== Species ==
- Deltote accentuata Berio, 1950
- Deltote acroleuca Turner, 1945
- Deltote albannularis Berio, 1954
- Deltote albibasis Hampson, 1902
- Deltote albiclava Draudt, 1950
- Deltote albifascia Walker, 1865
- Deltote albifissa Hampson, 1902
- Deltote albigutta Berio, 1960
- Deltote albitornata Berio, 1973
- Deltote albopunctalis H. Druce, 1895
- Deltote aldabrae Berio, 1962
- Deltote altitudinis Berio, 1973
- Deltote amydra C. Swinhoe, 1907
- Deltote amydrozona Hampson, 1910
- Deltote angulissima Gaede, 1935
- Deltote armilla Saalmüller, 1891
- Deltote astydamia Schaus, 1894
- Deltote atrinotata Hampson, 1910
- Deltote atrivitta Hampson, 1914
- Deltote aurata Moore, 1882
- Deltote awassensis Berio, 1984
- Deltote bankiana Fabricius, 1775 - silver barred
- Deltote basipleta Warren, 1913
- Deltote basiscripta Warren, 1913
- Deltote bella Bethune-Baker, 1911
- Deltote bellicula Hübner, 1818
- Deltote benita Schaus, 1904
- Deltote bernica Viette, 1957
- Deltote biaccentuata Berio, 1973
- Deltote binorbis Hampson, 1902
- Deltote bitrigonophora Berio, 1973
- Deltote brunnea Leech, 1889
- Deltote brunneicolor Hulstaert, 1924
- Deltote bryistis Turner, 1902
- Deltote bryophilina Hampson, 1910
- Deltote caffristis Hampson, 1910
- Deltote cataea H. Druce, 1889
- Deltote catoxantha Hampson, 1910
- Deltote chloromixta Alpheraky, 1892
- Deltote chlorophila Hampson, 1910
- Deltote chuza H. Druce, 1898
- Deltote cidarioides Moore, 1882
- Deltote citripennis hampson, 1910
- Deltote clandestina Turner, 1909
- Deltote coenia C. Swinhoe, 1901
- Deltote concava Dyar, 1920
- Deltote confusa Leech, 1900
- Deltote costaricana Franclemont & Todd, 1983
- Deltote crotopha C. Swinhoe, 1905
- Deltote cumalinea Bethune-Baker, 1911
- Deltote cuprea Schaus, 1898
- Deltote cupreofusca Hampson, 1910
- Deltote cupreofuscoides Berio, 1954
- Deltote curvibasis Draudt, 1950
- Deltote deceptoria Scopoli, 1763 - pretty marbled
- Deltote decissima Walker, 1865
- Deltote decorata H. Druce, 1898
- Deltote decorata Moore, 1882
- Deltote decorina Berio, 1954
- Deltote delicatula Christoph, 1882
- Deltote deltoidalis Dyar, 1918
- Deltote diascia Hampson, 1910
- Deltote digitalis Berio, 1977
- Deltote distinguenda Staudinger, 1888
- Deltote divisa Saalmüller, 1891
- Deltote dorata Hampson, 1902
- Deltote editha Schaus, 1904
- Deltote elaeostygia Sugi, 1982
- Deltote eremotropha Turner, 1932
- Deltote eublemmides Rothschild, 1915
- Deltote euchroa Hampson, 1910
- Deltote expatriata Hampson, 1914
- Deltote exranea Berio, 1937
- Deltote externa Berio, 1977
- Deltote falsa Butler, 1885
- Deltote fausta H. Druce, 1889
- Deltote fentoni Butler, 1881
- Deltote flavifrons Moore, [1887]
- Deltote flavofimbria Saalmüller, 1891
- Deltote foedalis Walker, [1866]
- Deltote folium Schaus, 1914
- Deltote formosana Hampson, 1910
- Deltote fuscicilia Hampson, 1891
- Deltote genuflexa Hampson, 1902
- Deltote geoga Schaus, 1906
- Deltote girba H. Druce, 1889
- Deltote glauca Hampson, 1910
- Deltote glaucopis Hampson, 1894
- Deltote gracilior Draudt, 1950
- Deltote griseifusa Hampson, 1914
- Deltote griseomixta Hampson, 1900
- Deltote hemicycla Berio, 1960
- Deltote holophaea Hampson, 1910
- Deltote homopteridia Schaus, 1911
- Deltote idiostygia Sugi, 1958
- Deltote iranica Kotzch, 1940
- Deltote jora Schaus, 1911
- Deltote labuana C. Swinhoe, 1904
- Deltote larentiformis Hampson, 1894
- Deltote larentioides Strand, 1920
- Deltote longena Schaus, 1904
- Deltote loxosema Bethune-Baker, 1911
- Deltote mabillei Berio, 1954
- Deltote macrouncina Berio, 1977
- Deltote magna Leech, 1900
- Deltote mandarina Leech, 1900
- Deltote manga Viette, 1982
- Deltote marginata Walker, 1866
- Deltote marmorata Schaus, 1904
- Deltote martjanovi Tschetverikov, 1904
- Deltote megalena Mabille, 1900
- Deltote melanopis Hampson, 1910
- Deltote melanostigma Hampson, 1894
- Deltote mella Schaus, 1894
- Deltote merta Schaus, 1901
- Deltote mesophoenica Dognin, 1914
- Deltote mesoplaga Hampson, 1918
- Deltote mesosecta Dyar, 1920
- Deltote metachrysa Hampson, 1910
- Deltote micardoides Berio, 1954
- Deltote micronephra Hampson, 1910
- Deltote micropis Hampson, 1910
- Deltote minuta H. Druce, 1889
- Deltote minutipuncta Berio, 1973
- Deltote mirella Schaus, 1904
- Deltote mochensis Schaus, 1904
- Deltote monorbis Berio, 1960
- Deltote musta Grote & Robinson, 1868
- Deltote mustapha Dyar, 1912
- Deltote mysteriosa Berio, 1954
- Deltote nemorum Oberthür, 1880
- Deltote nephrostica Hampson, 1914
- Deltote nivata Leech, 1900
- Deltote normalis Hampson, 1910
- Deltote novogonia Berio, 1955
- Deltote numisma Staudinger, 1888
- Deltote obliqua Moore, 1882
- Deltote obliquilinea Schaus, 1911
- Deltote obliquisignata Hampson, 1918
- Deltote ochra Turner, 1914/5
- Deltote octogintaocto Berio, 1977
- Deltote olenos Schaus, 1914
- Deltote olivella Draudt, 1950
- Deltote olivula Guenée, 1852
- Deltote onytes Schaus, 1894
- Deltote paloma Dognin, 1897
- Deltote papuensis Warren, 1913
- Deltote penthis Schaus, 1904
- Deltote perirrorata Hampson, 1918
- Deltote persubtilis Berio, 1984
- Deltote phaeomera Hampson, 1910
- Deltote phya H. Druce, 1889
- Deltote picatina Prout, 1921
- Deltote picta Hampson, 1896
- Deltote plumbifusa Hampson, 1914
- Deltote polita Berio, 1973
- Deltote postivitta Wileman, 1914
- Deltote potens Holloway, 1976
- Deltote praeapicilinea Berio, 1964
- Deltote pulmona Dyar, 1913
- Deltote pyrophora Hampson, 1914
- Deltote quadriorbis Berio, 1977
- Deltote retroversa Dyar, 1920
- Deltote roseopicta Warren, 1913
- Deltote rubrilis Berio, 1954
- Deltote rubrisignata Hampson, 1918
- Deltote ruvida Berio, 1977
- Deltote scapha Saalmüller, 1891
- Deltote schencki Strand, 1912
- Deltote sectirena Hampson, 1914
- Deltote semiannulata Warren, 1913
- Deltote semiglauca Dyar, 1920
- Deltote senex Butler, 1881
- Deltote shansiensis Berio, 1977
- Deltote sirbena Dognin, 1914
- Deltote squalida Leech, 1889
- Deltote stygia Butler, 1878
- Deltote stygiodes Sugi, 1958
- Deltote subcoenia Wileman & South 1916
- Deltote substellata Dyar, 1918
- Deltote superior Draudt, 1950
- Deltote syggenes Hampson, 1910
- Deltote taiwana Wileman, 1915
- Deltote tetratrigona Berio, 1973
- Deltote trifurca Berio, 1977
- Deltote trigonodes Hampson, 1910
- Deltote triocellata Berio, 1964
- Deltote uncula Clerck, 1759 - silver hook
- Deltote unguapicata Berio, 1977
- Deltote unipuncta Warren, 1913
- Deltote varicolora Hampson, 1902
- Deltote variicolor Le Cerf 1922
- Deltote varioplagata Berio, 1954
- Deltote veternosa Schaus, 1911
- Deltote vexillifera Berio, 1977
- Deltote videns Berio, 1963
- Deltote virescens Sugi, 1958
- Deltote viriditincta Wileman, 1915
- Deltote viridovata Berio, 1973
- Deltote vittata Service, 1965
- Deltote walta Schaus, 1904
- Deltote wiskotti Staudinger, 1888
- Deltote xemiloca Dyar, 1924

== Former species ==
- Deltote albidula is now Protodeltote albidula (Guenée, 1852)
- Deltote indeterminata is now Pseudeustrotia indeterminata (Barnes & McDunnough, 1918)
- Deltote muscosula is now Protodeltote muscosula (Guenée, 1852)
