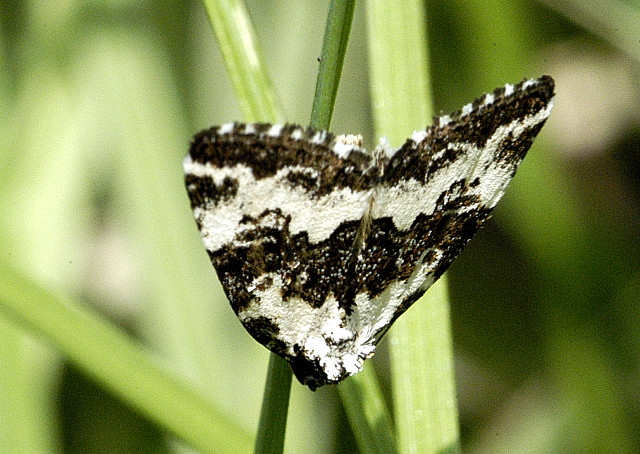

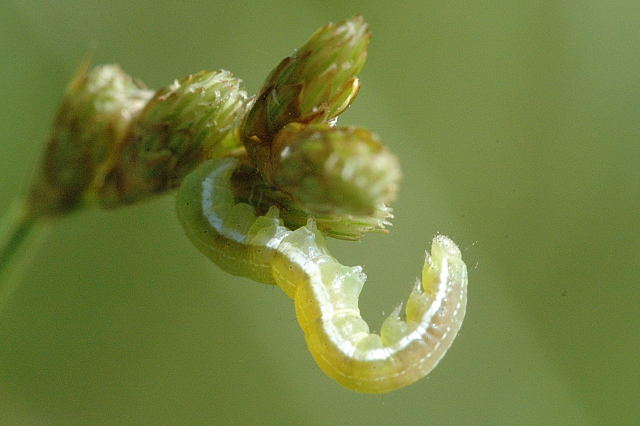

Scientific classification
- Domain: Eukaryota
- Kingdom: Animalia
- Phylum: Arthropoda
- Class: Insecta
- Order: Lepidoptera
- Superfamily: Noctuoidea
- Family: Noctuidae
- Genus: Deltote
- Species: D. deceptoria

Binomial name
- Deltote deceptoria (Scopoli, 1763)

= Deltote deceptoria =

Species of moth

Deltote deceptoria, the pretty marbled, is a moth of the family Noctuidae. The species was first described by Giovanni Antonio Scopoli in his 1763 Entomologia Carniolica. It is found in southern and central Europe.

== Technical description and variation ==
L. deceptoria Scop, (tineodes Hufn., atratula Schiff.) (52 d). Forewing chalk white; the markings fuscous black, varied with coarse olive and grey scales; a dark patch at base of costa; a central fascia edged by the wavy black inner and outer lines, the latter projecting and dentate beyond cell, and insinuate on submedian fold; orbicular stigma round, white, with olive grey centre, touching inner line; reniform white, with olive grey black-edged lunule, touching outer line; a costal blotch before, and the terminal area throughout beyond the white submarginal line dark; fringe olive grey, with dark middle line, the outer half chequered with pale grey; hindwing fuscous, with dark cellspot and curved whitish outer line. Larva grass-green, paler on dorsum with dark middle line and a white line on each side of the back; lateral stripes yellowish white; head green, with narrow white collar. The wingspan is 23–25 mm. The length of the forewings is 12–13 mm.

== Biology ==
The moth flies from April to July depending on the location.

The larvae feed on various grasses.
