= Ausava =

Scientific classification
- Domain: Eukaryota
- Kingdom: Animalia
- Phylum: Arthropoda
- Class: Insecta
- Order: Lepidoptera
- Superfamily: Noctuoidea
- Family: Noctuidae
- Subfamily: Eustrotiinae
- Genus: Ausava

Genus of moths

Ausava is a genus of moths of the family Noctuidae. It is now considered a synonym of Lithacodia.
