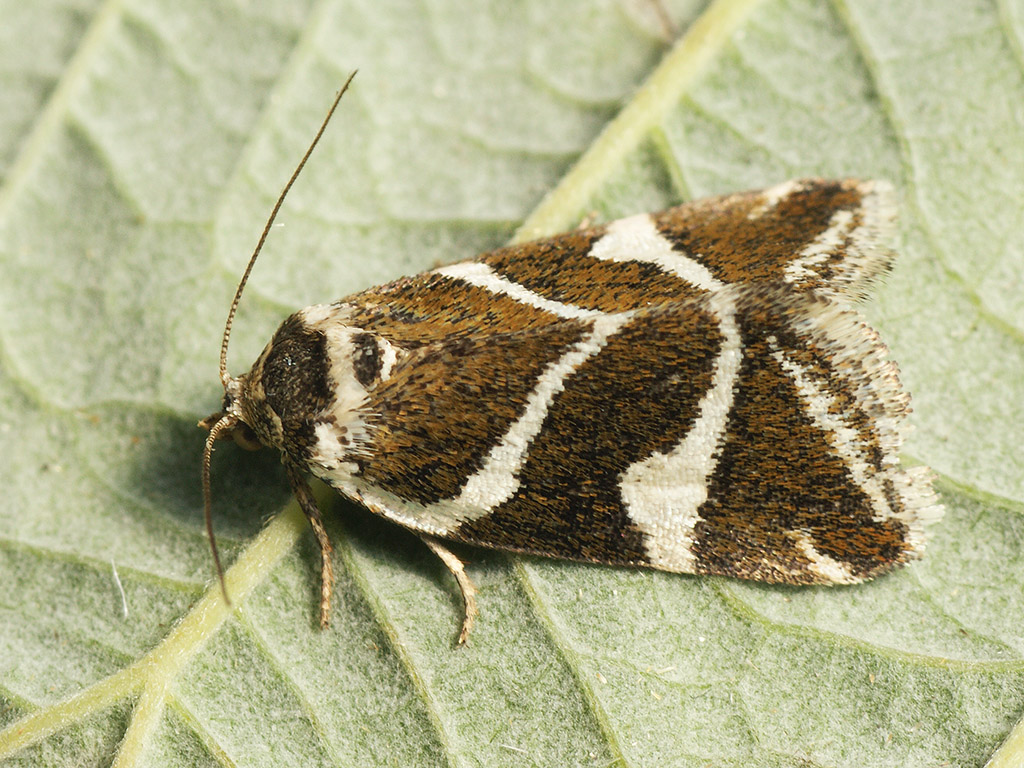
- Deltote bankiana Moscow Oblast

Scientific classification
- Kingdom: Animalia
- Phylum: Arthropoda
- Class: Insecta
- Order: Lepidoptera
- Superfamily: Noctuoidea
- Family: Noctuidae
- Genus: Deltote
- Species: D. bankiana

Binomial name
- Deltote bankiana (Fabricius, 1775)

= Deltote bankiana =

Species of moth

Deltote bankiana, the silver barred, is a moth of the family Noctuidae. The species was first described by Johan Christian Fabricius in 1775. It is found in the Palearctic.

The range of the species stretches from the Iberian Peninsula and France in the west to Japan and Korea in the east. However, the occurrences are often only isolated. In England, it is found in Cambridgeshire and Kent. Elsewhere in England the species is a regular immigrant. In Ireland it is resident in peat bogs in County Cork and County Kerry. in the north, the range is from South Sweden. In the south, it is absent from Greece. In the Alps, D. bankiana rises to 1500 meters.

== Description ==
The wingspan is 24–28 mm. The length of the forewings is 10–12 mm. "Forewing pale olive brown, sometimes sprinkled with darker brown; the markings shining white, edged with blackish; viz., a small spot at base of costa, two narrow outwardly oblique transverse fasciae, a short costal mark before apex, and a straight subterminal streak; reniform stigma indicated by a swelling in second fascia; hindwing luteous white, sprinkled with grey, deeper terminally. Staudinger describes the form amurula from Amurland as rather smaller than typical olivana and darker brown; red-brown specimens are occasionally taken in England, ab. rufescens Tutt;-—in obsoleta Tutt the oblique white lines are much attenuated and the reniform stands by itself; — in oblitescens Schultz the white bands are abbreviated, one or the other not reaching the margins; - in confluens Schultz the white bands are either connected laterally by a cross streak or are approximated to form one complete or semi-complete broad white band; these last two forms are from Silesia; I have seen nothing like this development in British specimens."

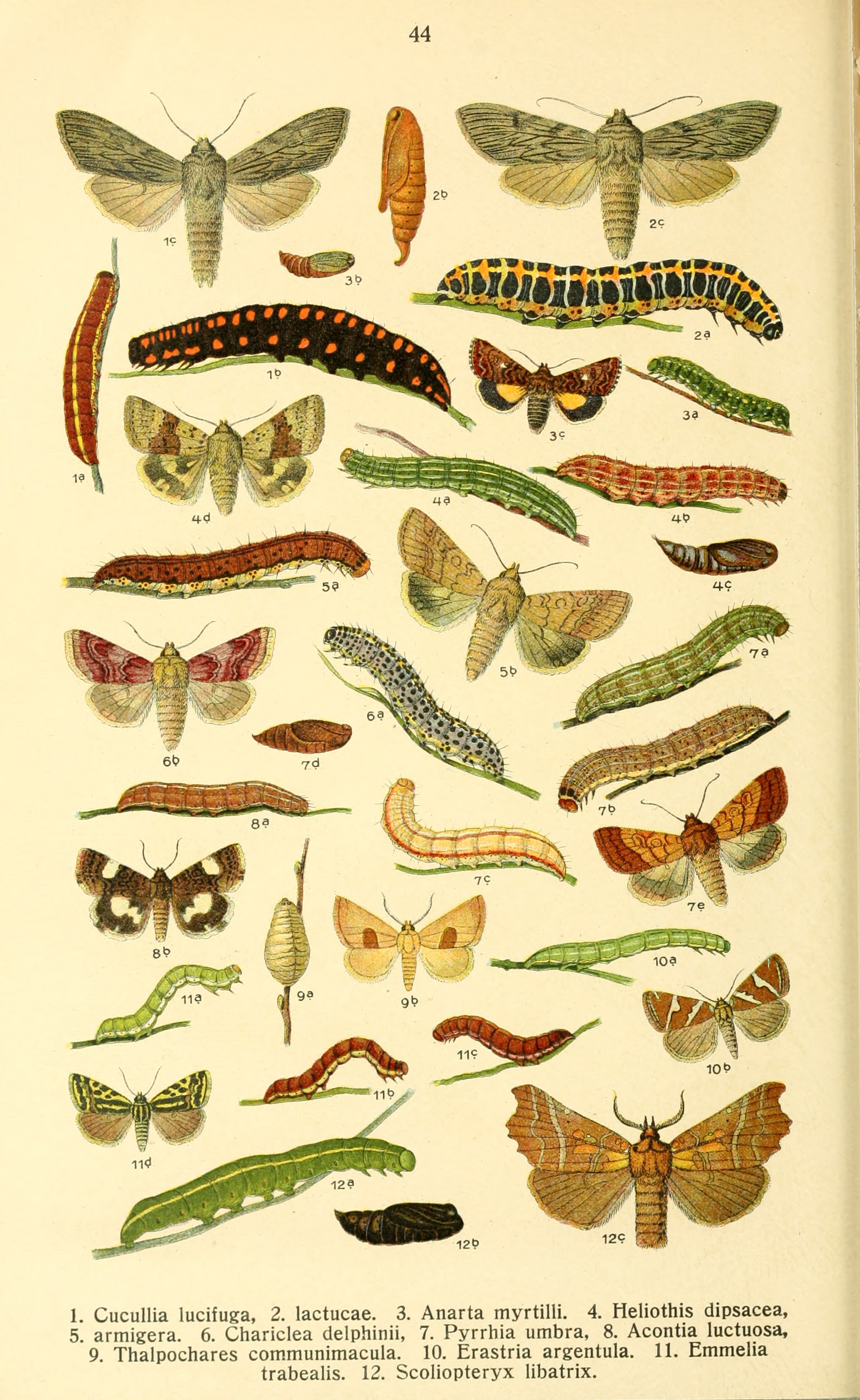
Larva and moth (10, 10a) as Erastria argentula in Karl Eckstein Die Schmetterlinge Deutschlands

== Biology ==
The moth flies from May to August depending on the location. The moth flies both at night and during the day.

Larva yellow green; dorsal line darker; subdorsal lines yellow; head green. The larvae feed on various grasses and Carex species.
