= Anterastria =

Scientific classification
- Kingdom: Animalia
- Phylum: Arthropoda
- Clade: Pancrustacea
- Class: Insecta
- Order: Lepidoptera
- Superfamily: Noctuoidea
- Family: Noctuidae
- Tribe: Pseudeustrotiini
- Genus: Anterastria; Sugi, 1982

Genus of moths

Anterastria is a genus of moths of the family Noctuidae. The genus was erected by Shigero Sugi in 1982.

== Species ==
- Anterastria atrata (Butler, 1881) south-eastern Siberia, Korea, Japan
- Anterastria teratophora (Herrich-Schäffer, [1854]) United States (Tennessee)
