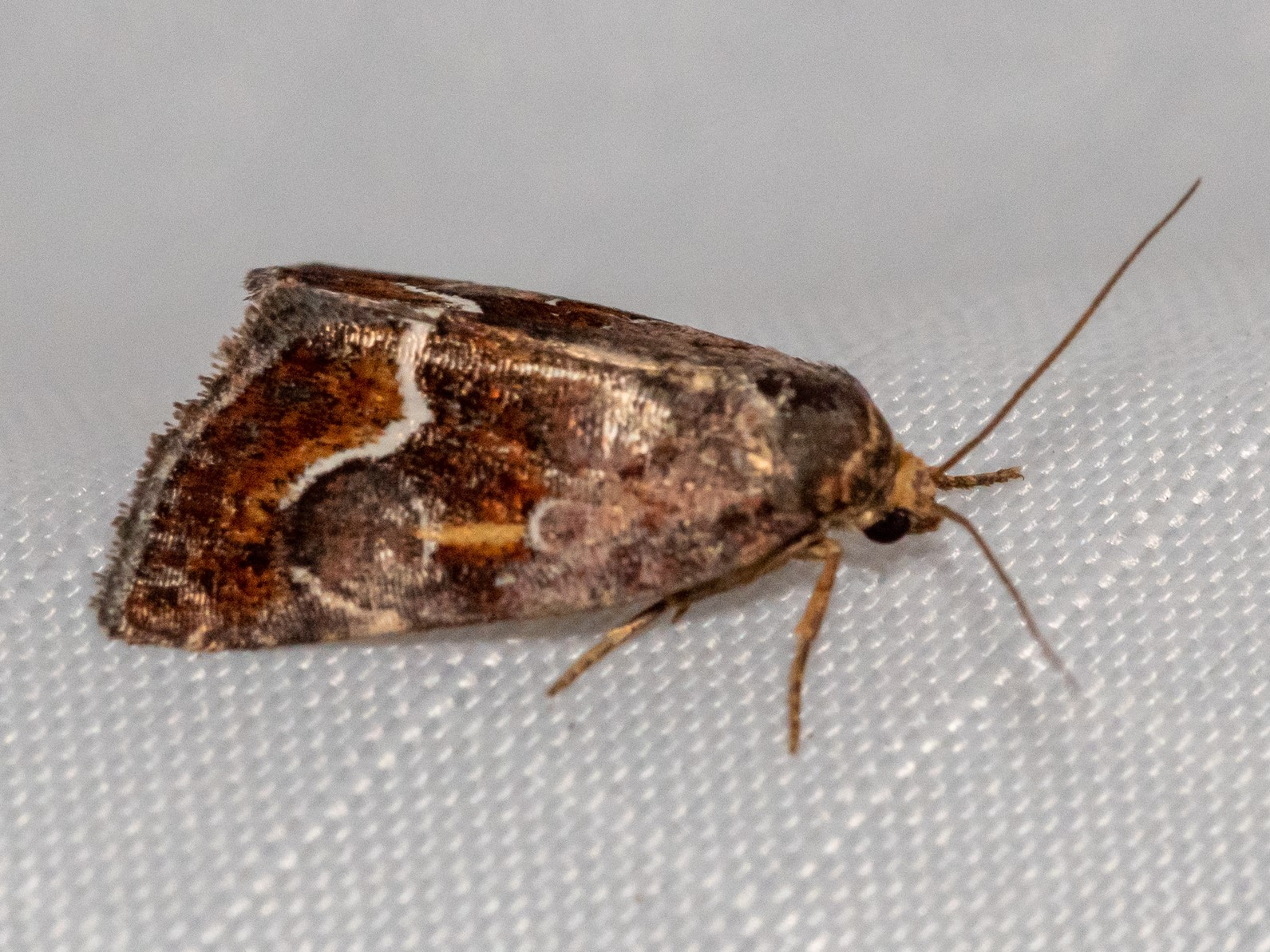

Scientific classification
- Kingdom: Animalia
- Phylum: Arthropoda
- Class: Insecta
- Order: Lepidoptera
- Superfamily: Noctuoidea
- Family: Noctuidae
- Genus: Deltote
- Species: D. bellicula

Binomial name
- Deltote bellicula (Hübner, 1818)

Synonyms
- Lithacodia bellicula Hübner, 1818

= Deltote bellicula =

Species of moth

Deltote bellicula, known generally as the bog deltote or bog lithacodia moth, is a species of moth in the family Noctuidae (the owlet moths).
