= Deltote flavifrons =

Scientific classification
- Kingdom: Animalia
- Phylum: Arthropoda
- Class: Insecta
- Order: Lepidoptera
- Superfamily: Noctuoidea
- Family: Noctuidae
- Genus: Deltote
- Species: D. flavifrons

Binomial name
- Deltote flavifrons (Moore, [1887])

Synonyms
- Gesonia flavifrons Moore, [1887]; Eustrotia flavifrons defuscata Warren, 1913

Species of moth

Deltote flavifrons is a moth of the family Noctuidae first described by Frederic Moore in 1887. It is found in Sri Lanka.
