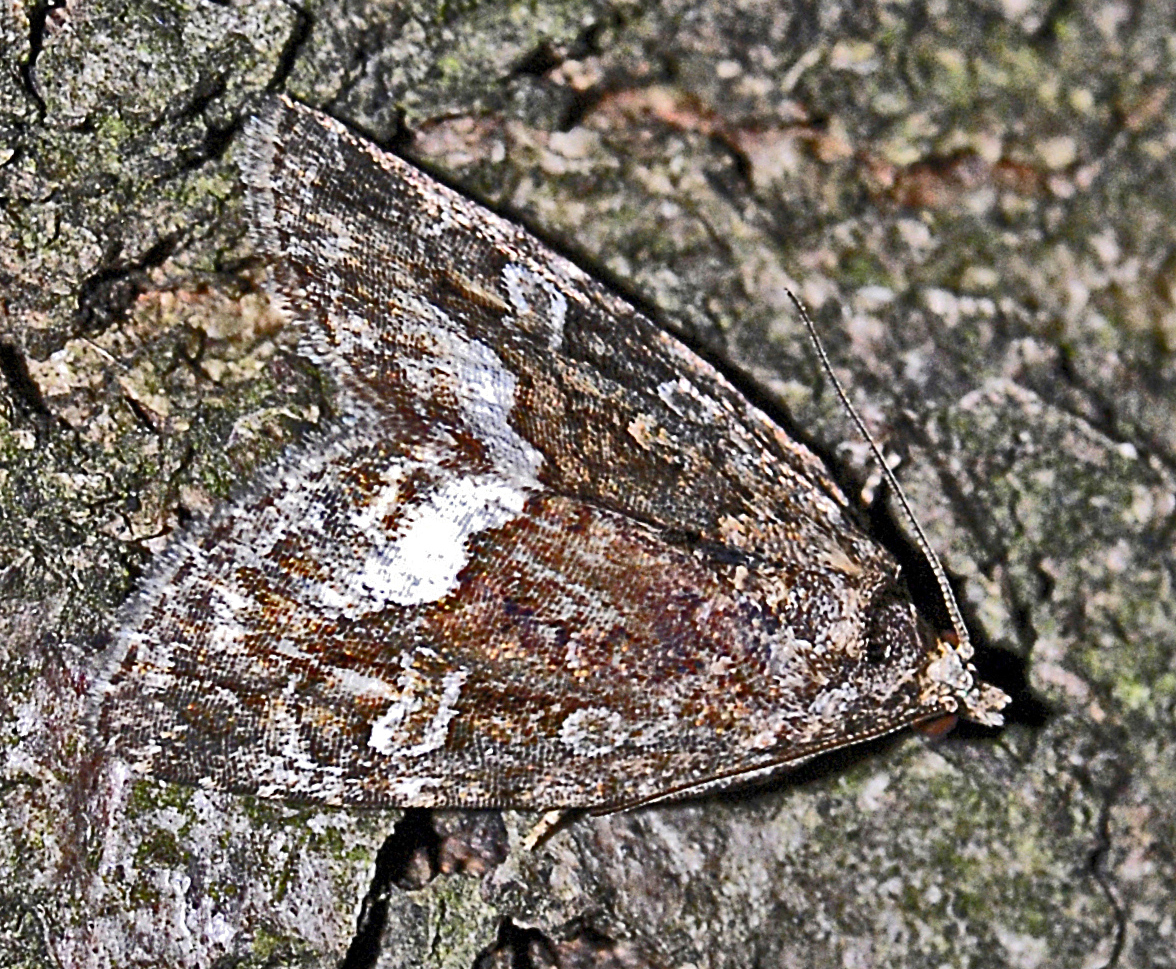
- Protodeltote pygarga

Scientific classification
- Domain: Eukaryota
- Kingdom: Animalia
- Phylum: Arthropoda
- Class: Insecta
- Order: Lepidoptera
- Superfamily: Noctuoidea
- Family: Noctuidae
- Subfamily: Eustrotiinae
- Genus: Protodeltote; Ueda, 1984

= Protodeltote =

Genus of moths

Protodeltote is a genus of moths of the family Noctuidae. The genus was described by Kyoichiro Ueda in 1984, and the type species is Protodeltote pygarga.

Species

- Protodeltote albidula (Guenée, 1852)
- Protodeltote distinguenda (Staudinger, 1888)
- Protodeltote inexpectata Ueda, 1984
- Protodeltote muscosula (Guenée, 1852)
- Protodeltote pygarga Hufnagel, 1766 – marbled white spot
- Protodeltote wiscotti (Staudinger, 1888)
