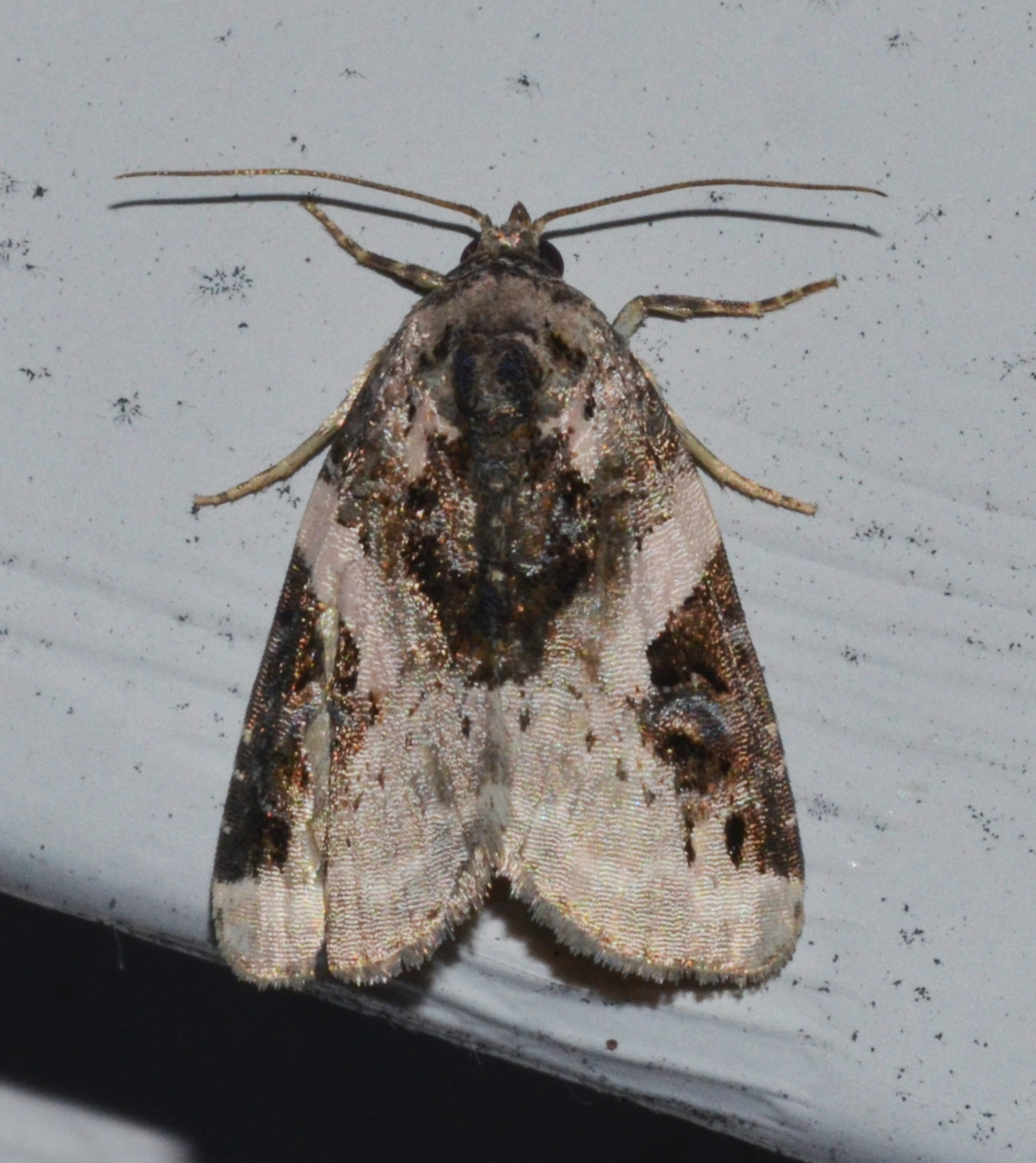

Scientific classification
- Kingdom: Animalia
- Phylum: Arthropoda
- Class: Insecta
- Order: Lepidoptera
- Superfamily: Noctuoidea
- Family: Noctuidae
- Genus: Pseudeustrotia
- Species: P. carneola

Binomial name
- Pseudeustrotia carneola (Guenée, 1852)

Synonyms
- Erastria carneola Guenée, 1852; Lithacodia carneola; Erastria biplaga Walker, 1858

= Pseudeustrotia carneola =

Species of insect

Pseudeustrotia carneola, the pink-barred lithacodia moth, is a moth of the family Noctuidae. The species was first described by Achille Guenée in 1852. It is found in North America, where it has been recorded from Nova Scotia and New Brunswick west to Alberta and Colorado, south to the Gulf of Mexico. The habitat consists of woodland edges, mesic meadows and grasslands regions.

The wingspan is 20–24 mm. Adults are on wing from May to September.

The larvae feed on Rumex (including Rumex patientia), Polygonum and Solidago species.
