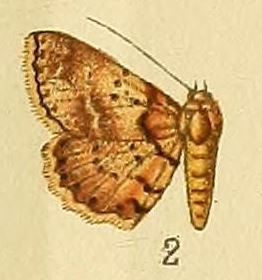

Scientific classification
- Kingdom: Animalia
- Phylum: Arthropoda
- Clade: Pancrustacea
- Class: Insecta
- Order: Lepidoptera
- Superfamily: Noctuoidea
- Family: Noctuidae
- Genus: Lithacodia
- Species: L. flavofimbria

Binomial name
- Lithacodia flavofimbria (Saalmüller, 1881)

Synonyms
- Anchiroe glavofimbria Sallmüller

= Lithacodia flavofimbria =

Species of moth

Lithacodia flavofimbria is a species of moth in the family Erebidae first described by Max Saalmüller in 1881. It is found in Madagascar.
