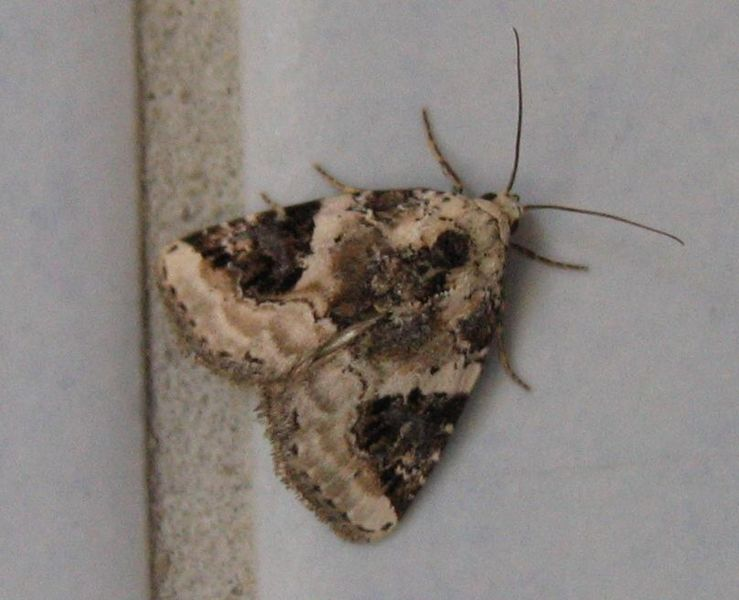

Scientific classification
- Domain: Eukaryota
- Kingdom: Animalia
- Phylum: Arthropoda
- Class: Insecta
- Order: Lepidoptera
- Superfamily: Noctuoidea
- Family: Noctuidae
- Genus: Pseudeustrotia
- Species: P. candidula

Binomial name
- Pseudeustrotia candidula (Denis & Schiffermüller, 1775)

= Pseudeustrotia candidula =

Species of moth

Pseudeustrotia candidula, the shining marbled, is a moth of the family Noctuidae. The species was first described by Michael Denis and Ignaz Schiffermüller in 1775. It can be found from Europe to Japan.

The wingspan is about 22 mm. The moths flies from May to September depending on the location.

The larvae feed on various plants, including Rumex acetosella and Polygonum bistorta.
