= Protodeltote wiscotti =

Scientific classification
- Domain: Eukaryota
- Kingdom: Animalia
- Phylum: Arthropoda
- Class: Insecta
- Order: Lepidoptera
- Superfamily: Noctuoidea
- Family: Noctuidae
- Genus: Protodeltote
- Species: P. wiscotti

Binomial name
- Protodeltote wiscotti (Staudinger, 1888)

Synonyms
- Erastria wiscotti Staudinger, 1888; Lithacodia wiscotti; Eustrotia viskotti; Micardia jezoensis Sugi, 1959

Species of moth

Protodeltote wiscotti is a species of moth of the family Noctuidae first described by Otto Staudinger in 1888. It is found in the Russian Far East and Japan.

The length of the forewings is 10–12.5 mm.
