= Koyaga senex =

Scientific classification
- Domain: Eukaryota
- Kingdom: Animalia
- Phylum: Arthropoda
- Class: Insecta
- Order: Lepidoptera
- Superfamily: Noctuoidea
- Family: Noctuidae
- Genus: Koyaga
- Species: K. senex

Binomial name
- Koyaga senex (Butler, 1881)

Synonyms
- Erastria senex Butler, 1881; Lithacodia senex Hampson, 1910; Jaspidia senex Ioune & Sugi, 1958

Species of moth

Koyaga senex is a species of moth of the family Noctuidae first described by Arthur Gardiner Butler in 1881. It is found in Japan.

The length of the forewings is 9–12 mm.
