= Protodeltote inexpectata =

Scientific classification
- Domain: Eukaryota
- Kingdom: Animalia
- Phylum: Arthropoda
- Class: Insecta
- Order: Lepidoptera
- Superfamily: Noctuoidea
- Family: Noctuidae
- Genus: Protodeltote
- Species: P. inexpectata

Binomial name
- Protodeltote inexpectata Ueda, 1987

Species of moth

Protodeltote inexpectata is a species of moth of the family Noctuidae, first described by Kyoichiro Ueda in 1987. It is found in Japan.

The length of the forewings is 10–12 mm.
