= Lithacodia phya =

Scientific classification
- Domain: Eukaryota
- Kingdom: Animalia
- Phylum: Arthropoda
- Class: Insecta
- Order: Lepidoptera
- Superfamily: Noctuoidea
- Family: Noctuidae
- Genus: Lithacodia
- Species: L. phya

Binomial name
- Lithacodia phya (H. Druce, 1889)

Species of moth

Lithacodia phya is a species of moth in the family Noctuidae (the owlet moths). It is found in North America.

The MONA or Hodges number for Lithacodia phya is 9055.
