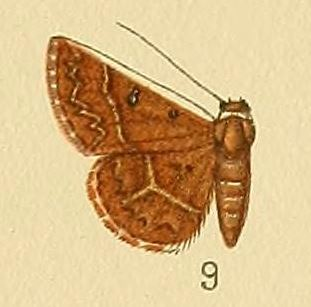

Scientific classification
- Kingdom: Animalia
- Phylum: Arthropoda
- Class: Insecta
- Order: Lepidoptera
- Superfamily: Noctuoidea
- Family: Noctuidae
- Genus: Lithacodia
- Species: L. metachrysa

Binomial name
- Lithacodia metachrysa Hampson, 1910

= Lithacodia metachrysa =

Species of moth

Lithacodia metachrysa is a species of moth in the family Erebidae first described by George Hampson in 1910. It is found in central Madagascar.
