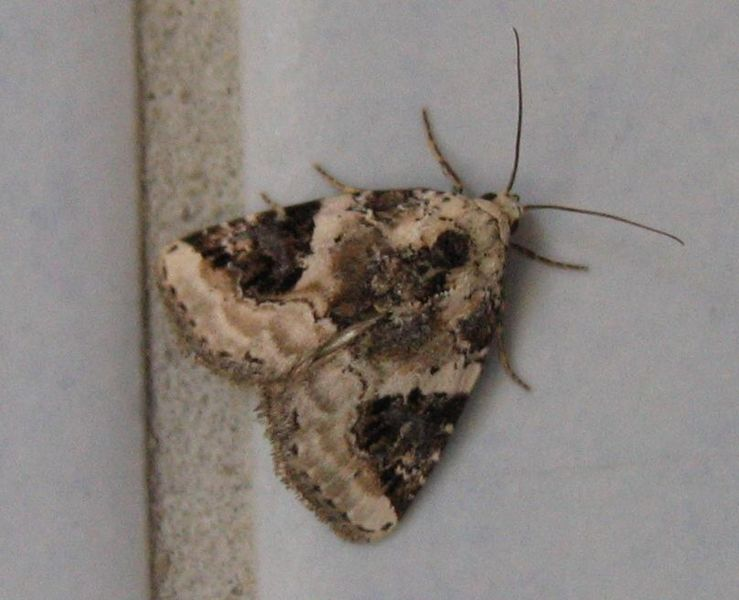
- Pseudeustrotia candidula, the shining marbled

Scientific classification
- Domain: Eukaryota
- Kingdom: Animalia
- Phylum: Arthropoda
- Class: Insecta
- Order: Lepidoptera
- Superfamily: Noctuoidea
- Family: Noctuidae
- Tribe: Pseudeustrotiini
- Genus: Pseudeustrotia; Warren, 1913

= Pseudeustrotia =

Genus of moths

Pseudeustrotia is a genus of moths of the family Noctuidae. The genus was erected by William Warren in 1913.

== Species ==
- Pseudeustrotia bipartita (Wileman, 1914)
- Pseudeustrotia candidula (Denis & Schiffermüller, 1775)
- Pseudeustrotia carneola (Guenée, 1852)
- Pseudeustrotia dimera (Hampson, 1910)
- Pseudeustrotia indeterminata (Barnes & McDunnough, 1918)
- Pseudeustrotia isomera (Hampson, 1910)
- Pseudeustrotia macrosema (Lower, 1903)
- Pseudeustrotia semialba (Hampson, 1894)
