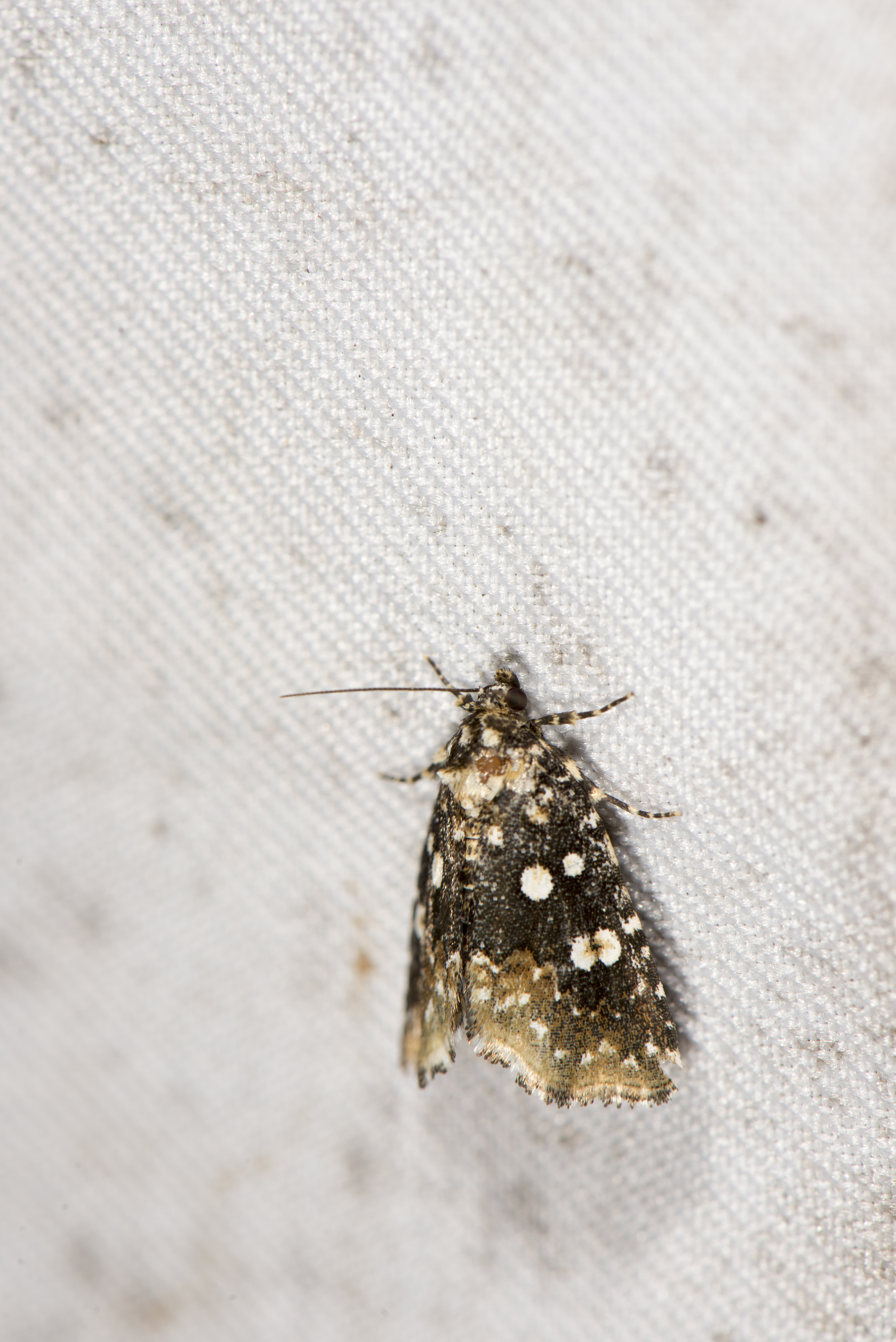

Scientific classification
- Domain: Eukaryota
- Kingdom: Animalia
- Phylum: Arthropoda
- Class: Insecta
- Order: Lepidoptera
- Superfamily: Noctuoidea
- Family: Noctuidae
- Subfamily: Acontiinae
- Genus: Koyaga; Ueda, 1984

= Koyaga =

Genus of moths

Koyaga is a genus of moths of the family Noctuidae. The genus was described by Ueda in 1984.

== Selected species ==
- Koyaga falsa (Butler, 1885)
- Koyaga numisma (Staudinger, 1888)
- Koyaga senex (Butler, 1881)
- Koyaga virescens (Sugi, 1958)
- Koyaga viriditincta (Wileman, 1915)

== General references ==
- "Koyaga". Catalogue of Life in Taiwan (in Chinese). Biodiversity Research Center, Academia Sinica.
- "80.ヤガ科(Noctuidae) コヤガ亜科(Acontiinae+Eustrotiinae) Koyaga 一覧". みんなで作る日本産蛾類図鑑 [An Identification Guide of Japanese Moths Compiled by Everyone] (in Japanese).
