= Pseudeustrotiini =

Scientific classification
- Kingdom: Animalia
- Phylum: Arthropoda
- Clade: Pancrustacea
- Class: Insecta
- Order: Lepidoptera
- Superfamily: Noctuoidea
- Family: Noctuidae
- Subfamily: Noctuinae
- Tribe: Pseudeustrotiini

Tribe of moths

Pseudeustrotiini is a tribe of cutworm or dart moths in the family Noctuidae. There are at least three described species in Pseudeustrotiini.

== Genera ==
- Anterastria Sugi, 1982
- Pseudeustrotia Warren, 1913
