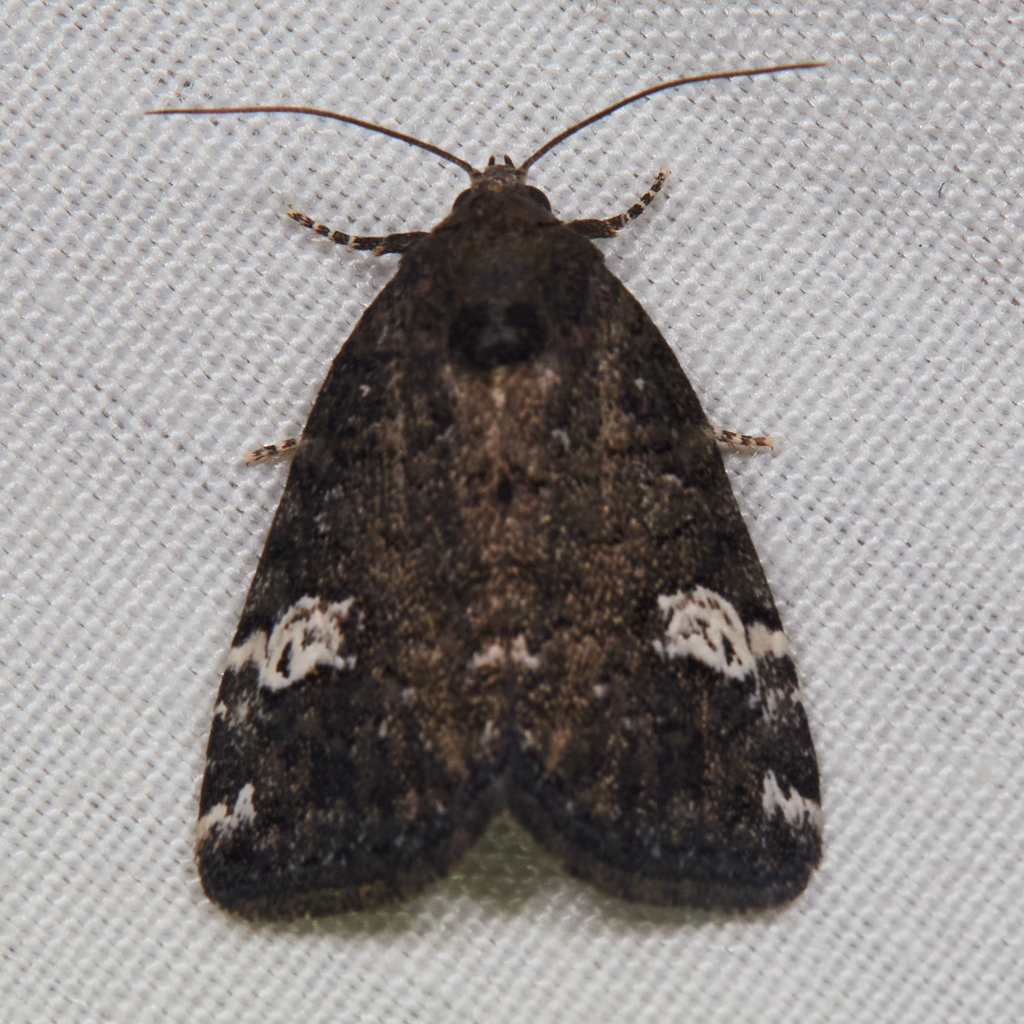

Scientific classification
- Kingdom: Animalia
- Phylum: Arthropoda
- Class: Insecta
- Order: Lepidoptera
- Superfamily: Noctuoidea
- Family: Noctuidae
- Genus: Anterastria
- Species: A. teratophora

Binomial name
- Anterastria teratophora Herrich-Schäffer, 1854

Synonyms
- Erastria teratophora; Bryophila tetraphora

= Anterastria teratophora =

Species of moth

Anterastria teratophora, the grey marvel, is a moth of the family Noctuidae. The species was first described by Gottlieb August Wilhelm Herrich-Schäffer in 1854. It is found in North America from Quebec west to central Alberta, south to Florida and Arizona.

The wingspan is about 25 mm. Adults are on wing from May to August depending on the location. There is one generation per year.

The larvae feed on Mentha and Monarda species.
