= Pseudodeltote =

Scientific classification
- Domain: Eukaryota
- Kingdom: Animalia
- Phylum: Arthropoda
- Class: Insecta
- Order: Lepidoptera
- Superfamily: Noctuoidea
- Family: Noctuidae
- Subfamily: Eustrotiinae
- Genus: Pseudodeltote; Ueda, 1984

Genus of moths

Pseudodeltote is a genus of moths of the family Noctuidae.

== Selected species ==
- Pseudodeltote brunnea (Leech, 1889)
- Pseudodeltote coenia (Swinhoe, 1901)
- Pseudodeltote formosana (Hampson, 1910)
- Pseudodeltote postvittata (Wileman, 1914)
- Pseudodeltote subcoenia (Wileman & South, 1916)
