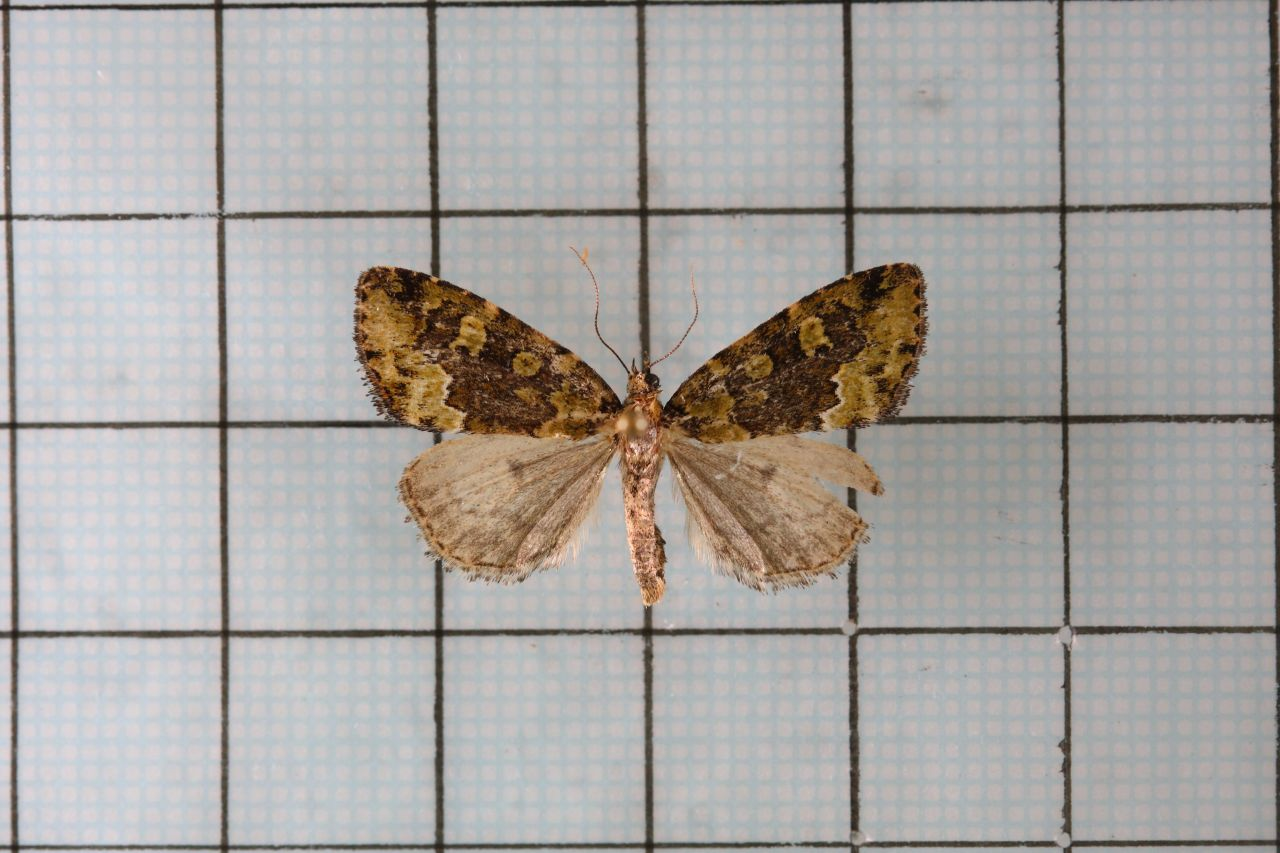

Scientific classification
- Kingdom: Animalia
- Phylum: Arthropoda
- Class: Insecta
- Order: Lepidoptera
- Superfamily: Noctuoidea
- Family: Noctuidae
- Genus: Pseudodeltote
- Species: P. formosana

Binomial name
- Pseudodeltote formosana (Hampson, 1910)

Synonyms
- Lithacodia formosana Hampson, 1910

= Pseudodeltote formosana =

Species of moth

Pseudodeltote formosana is a species of moth of the family Noctuidae first described by George Hampson in 1910. It is found in Taiwan. The length of the forewings is 12–14 mm.
