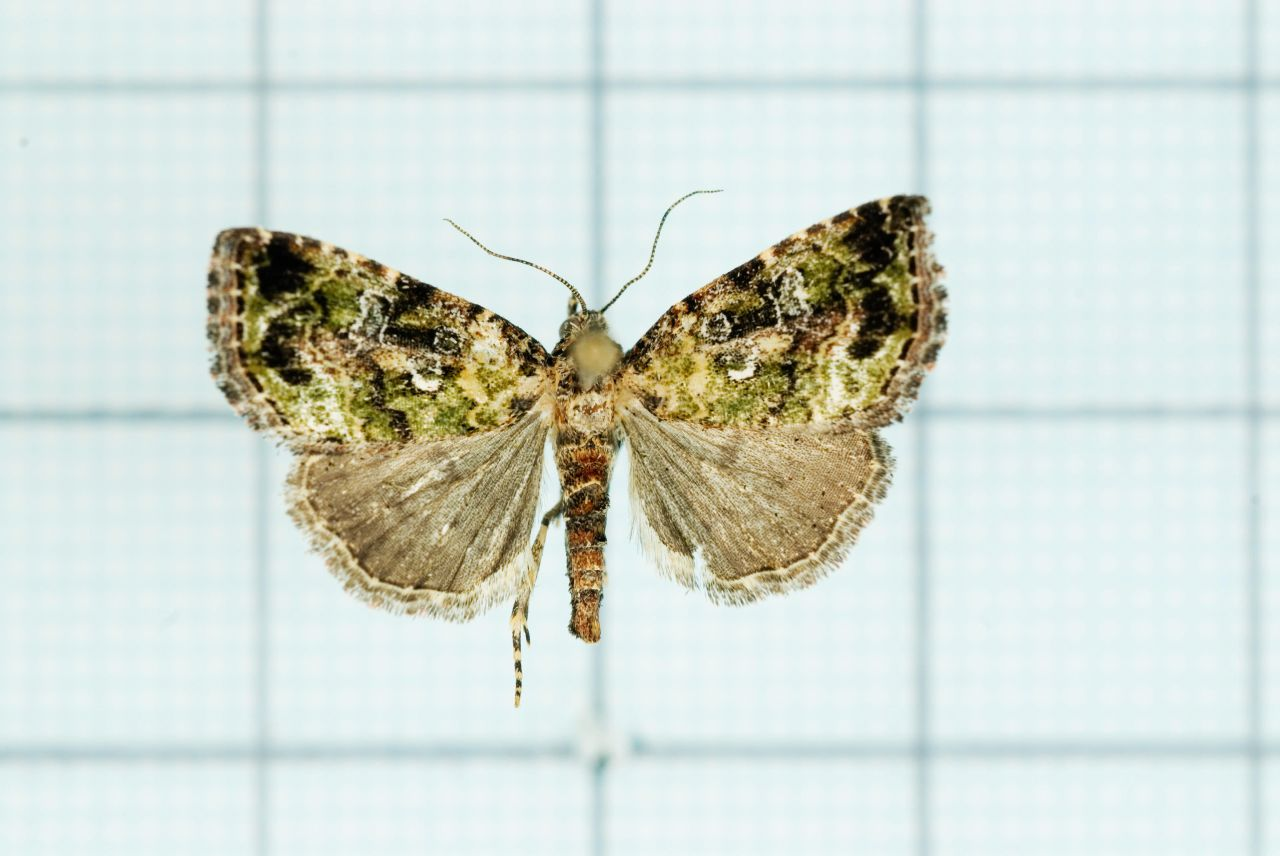

Scientific classification
- Kingdom: Animalia
- Phylum: Arthropoda
- Clade: Pancrustacea
- Class: Insecta
- Order: Lepidoptera
- Superfamily: Noctuoidea
- Family: Noctuidae
- Genus: Koyaga
- Species: K. virescens

Binomial name
- Koyaga virescens (Sugi, 1958)

Synonyms
- Jaspidia virescens Sugi, 1958; Lithacodia virescens Sugi, 1982

= Koyaga virescens =

Species of moth

Koyaga virescens is a moth of the family Noctuidae first described by Shigero Sugi in 1958. It is found in Japan and Taiwan.

The length of the forewings is 8–11 mm.
