= Koyaga falsa =

Scientific classification
- Domain: Eukaryota
- Kingdom: Animalia
- Phylum: Arthropoda
- Class: Insecta
- Order: Lepidoptera
- Superfamily: Noctuoidea
- Family: Noctuidae
- Genus: Koyaga
- Species: K. falsa

Binomial name
- Koyaga falsa (Butler, 1885)

Synonyms
- Miana falsa Butler, 1885; Lithacodia falsa Hampson, 1910; Jaspidia falsa Inoue & Sugi, 1958

Species of moth

Koyaga falsa is a species of moth of the family Noctuidae first described by Arthur Gardiner Butler in 1885. It is found in China, Korea and Japan.
