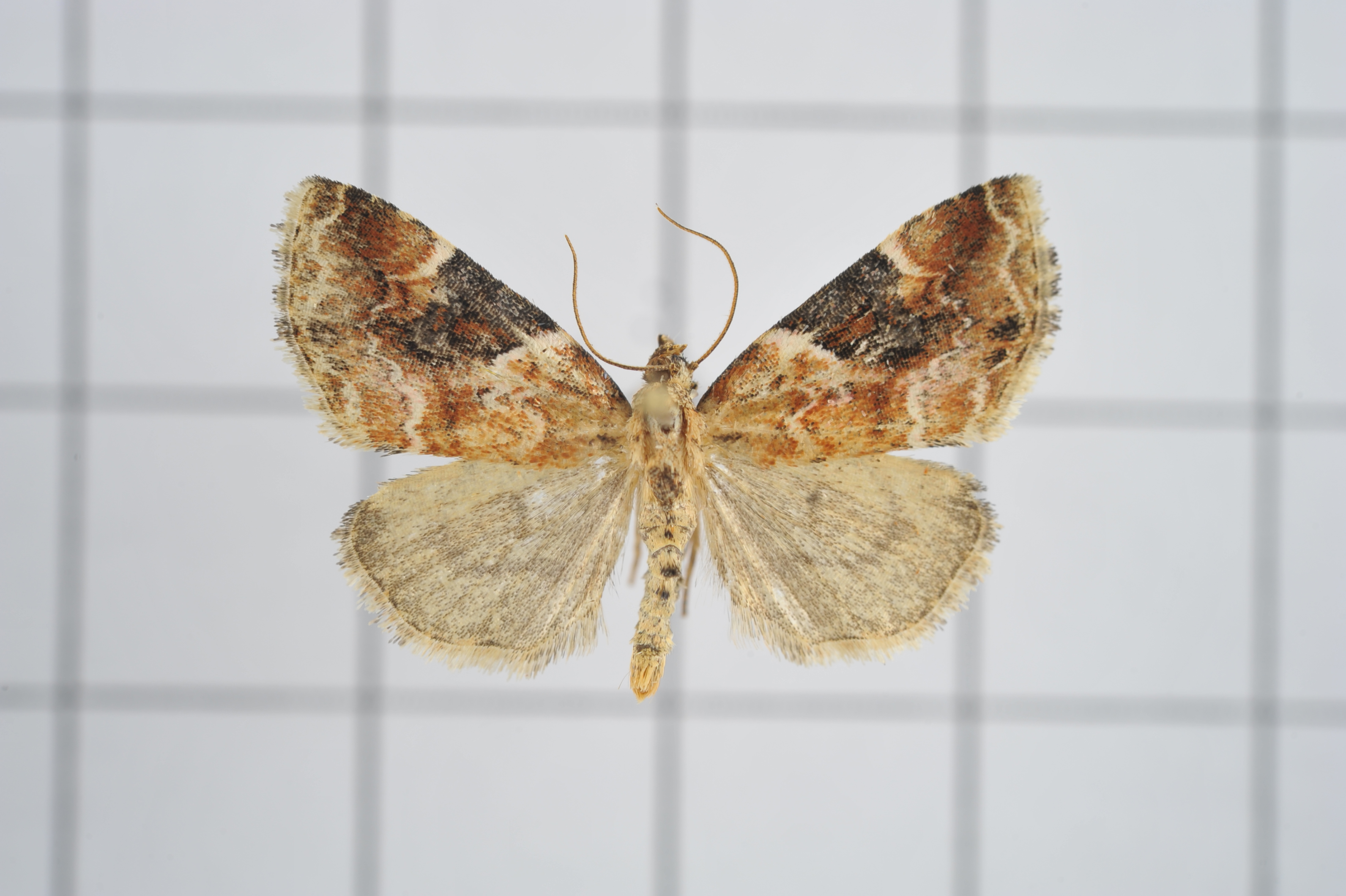

Scientific classification
- Kingdom: Animalia
- Phylum: Arthropoda
- Class: Insecta
- Order: Lepidoptera
- Superfamily: Noctuoidea
- Family: Noctuidae
- Genus: Pseudodeltote
- Species: P. coenia

Binomial name
- Pseudodeltote coenia (C. Swinhoe, 1901)

Synonyms
- Metachrostis coenia C. Swinhoe, 1901; Lithacodia coenia

= Pseudodeltote coenia =

Species of moth

Pseudodeltote coenia is a species of moth of the family Noctuidae first described by Charles Swinhoe in 1901. It is found in Taiwan.

The length of the forewings is 11–13 mm.
