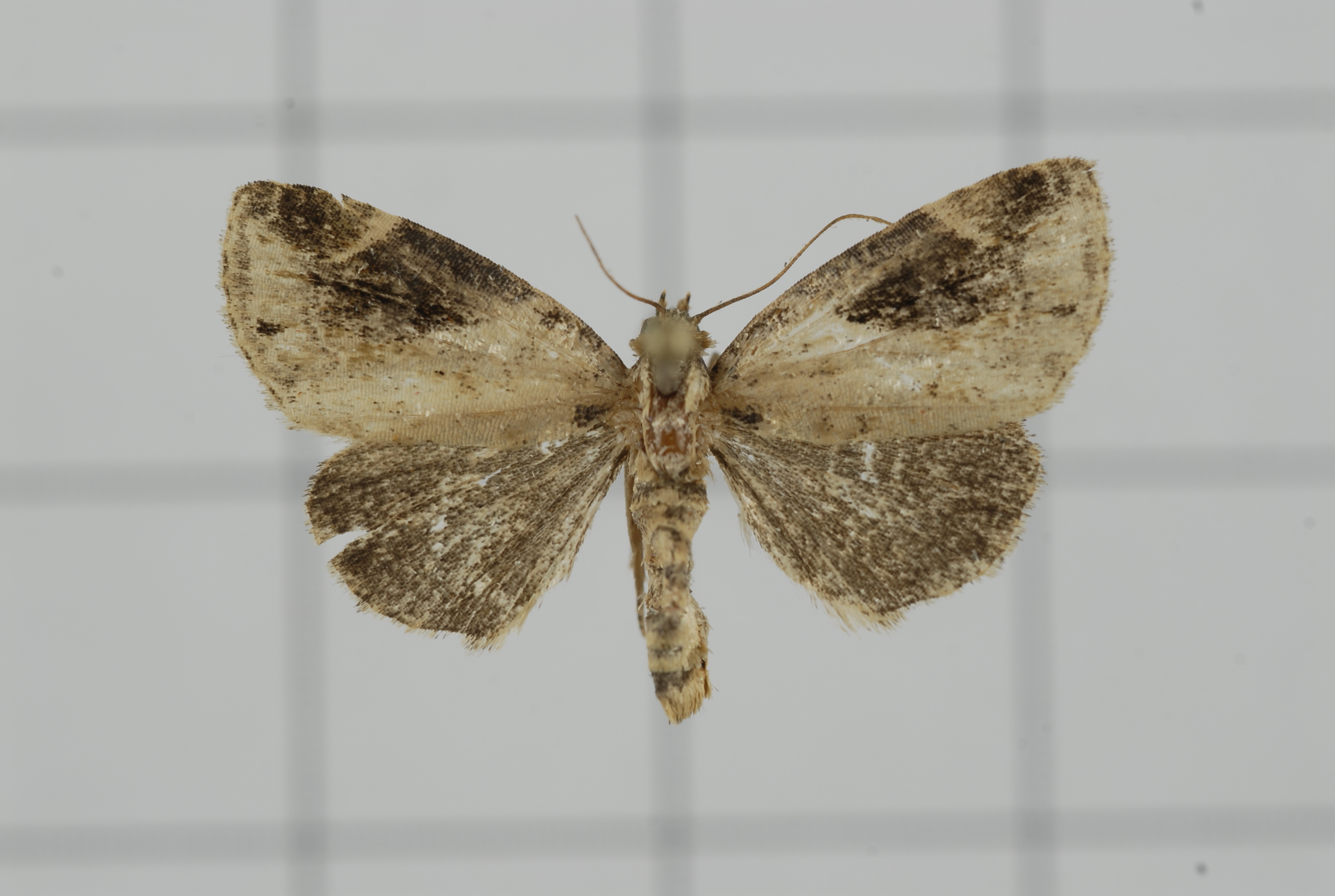

Scientific classification
- Kingdom: Animalia
- Phylum: Arthropoda
- Class: Insecta
- Order: Lepidoptera
- Superfamily: Noctuoidea
- Family: Noctuidae
- Genus: Pseudodeltote
- Species: P. subcoenia

Binomial name
- Pseudodeltote subcoenia (Wileman and South, 1916)

Synonyms
- Lithacodia subcoenia Wileman and South, 1916

= Pseudodeltote subcoenia =

Species of moth

Pseudodeltote subcoenia is a species of moth of the family Noctuidae first described by Alfred Ernest Wileman and Richard South in 1916. It is found in Taiwan and Godawari, Nepal.
