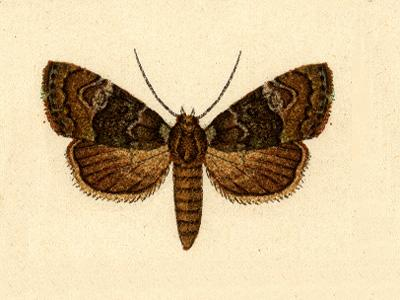

Scientific classification
- Kingdom: Animalia
- Phylum: Arthropoda
- Class: Insecta
- Order: Lepidoptera
- Superfamily: Noctuoidea
- Family: Noctuidae
- Genus: Deltote
- Species: D. glauca

Binomial name
- Deltote glauca (Hampson, 1910)

Synonyms
- Lithacodia glauca Hampson, 1910

= Deltote glauca =

Species of moth

Deltote glauca is a moth of the family Noctuidae. It is found in Jamaica.
