= Protodeltote distinguenda =

Scientific classification
- Domain: Eukaryota
- Kingdom: Animalia
- Phylum: Arthropoda
- Class: Insecta
- Order: Lepidoptera
- Superfamily: Noctuoidea
- Family: Noctuidae
- Genus: Protodeltote
- Species: P. distinguenda

Binomial name
- Protodeltote distinguenda (Staudinger, 1888)

Synonyms
- Erastria distinguenda Staudinger, 1888; Lithacodia distinguenda; Jaspidia distinguenda

Species of moth

Protodeltote distinguenda is a species of moth of the family Noctuidae first described by Otto Staudinger in 1888 as Lithacodia distinguenda. It is found in Korea, Taiwan, the Russian far-east, and Japan.

The length of the forewings is 9–13 mm.
