= Pseudodeltote brunnea =

Scientific classification
- Domain: Eukaryota
- Kingdom: Animalia
- Phylum: Arthropoda
- Class: Insecta
- Order: Lepidoptera
- Superfamily: Noctuoidea
- Family: Noctuidae
- Genus: Pseudodeltote
- Species: P. brunnea

Binomial name
- Pseudodeltote brunnea (Leech, 1889)

Synonyms
- Erastria brunnea Leech, 1889; Lithacodia brunnea; Jaspidia brunnea

Species of moth

Pseudodeltote brunnea is a species of moth of the family Noctuidae first described by John Henry Leech in 1889. It is found on the Japanese islands of Hokkaido, Honshu, Shikoku and Kyushu.

The length of the forewings is 9–11 mm.
