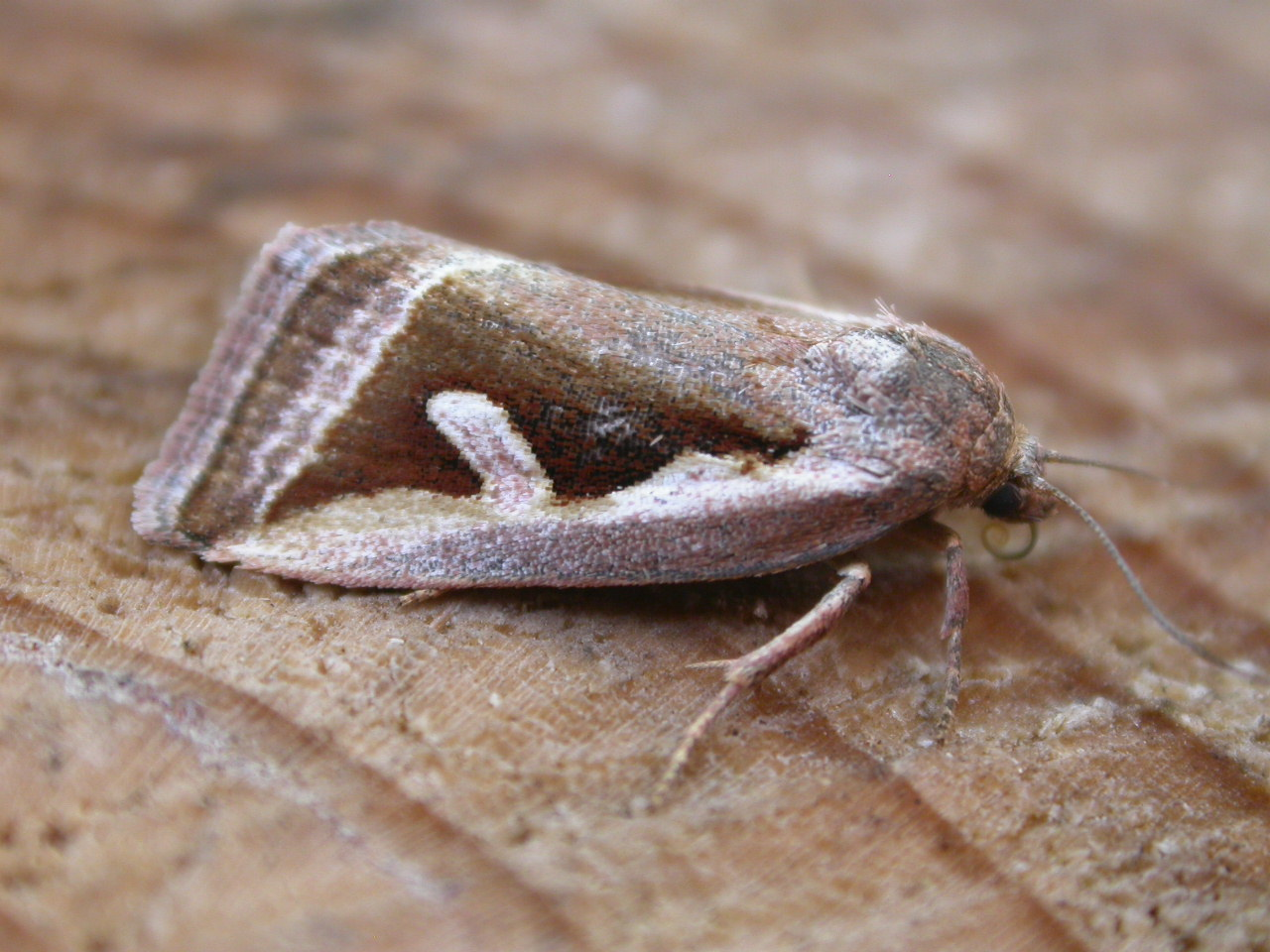

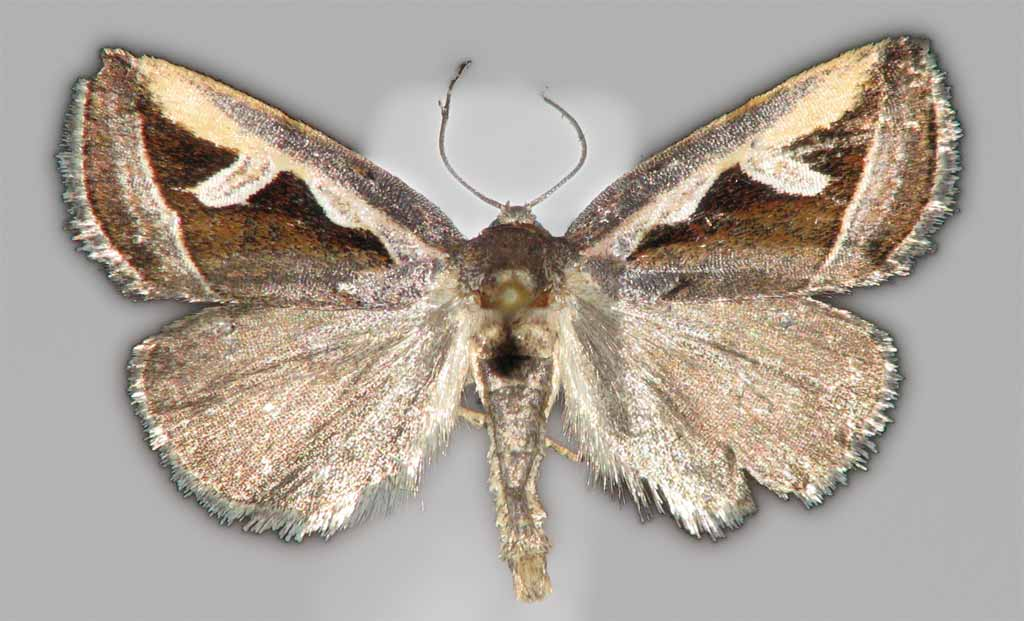

Scientific classification
- Kingdom: Animalia
- Phylum: Arthropoda
- Class: Insecta
- Order: Lepidoptera
- Superfamily: Noctuoidea
- Family: Noctuidae
- Genus: Lithacodia
- Species: L. uncula

Binomial name
- Lithacodia uncula (Clerck, 1759)

Synonyms
- Deltote uncula (Clerck, 1759); Phalaena uncula; Phalaena singularis; Noctua unca; Eustrotia uncula

= Lithacodia uncula =

Silver hook

Species of moth

Lithacodia uncula, the silver hook, is a moth of the family Noctuidae. The species was first described by Carl Alexander Clerck in 1759. It is found in the Palearctic realm.

== Distribution ==
Lithacodia uncula has a vast distribution area ranging from the French western Pyrenees to Japan. In the north it extends to south and central England, Ireland, Scandinavia in the areas around the Baltic Sea, in Finland and northern Russia. Largely missing in the Mediterranean with the exception of two smaller occurrences on the French Mediterranean coast and in Tuscany, as well as on the northern Adriatic coast (in northern Italy, Slovenia and Croatia). In south-eastern Europe the distribution area stretches far to the south to northern Albania and northern Greece. From there it runs east (Russian Far East, northern China, Japan, Korea). Also to the south in Bulgaria, Ukraine, Crimea and southern Russia, Central Asia and Siberia.

== Description ==
The wingspan is 20–22 mm. Wings short and broad. Forewing olive brown, darker in disc; a broad tannish-peach coloured streak along the costa and another on the inner margin; the orbicular and reniform stigmata tannish peach, whiter edged, confluent with the costal streak; some pale lines before termen, straight and parallel, the innermost white; hindwing paler; the dark-suffused examples are named obscurior Spul.

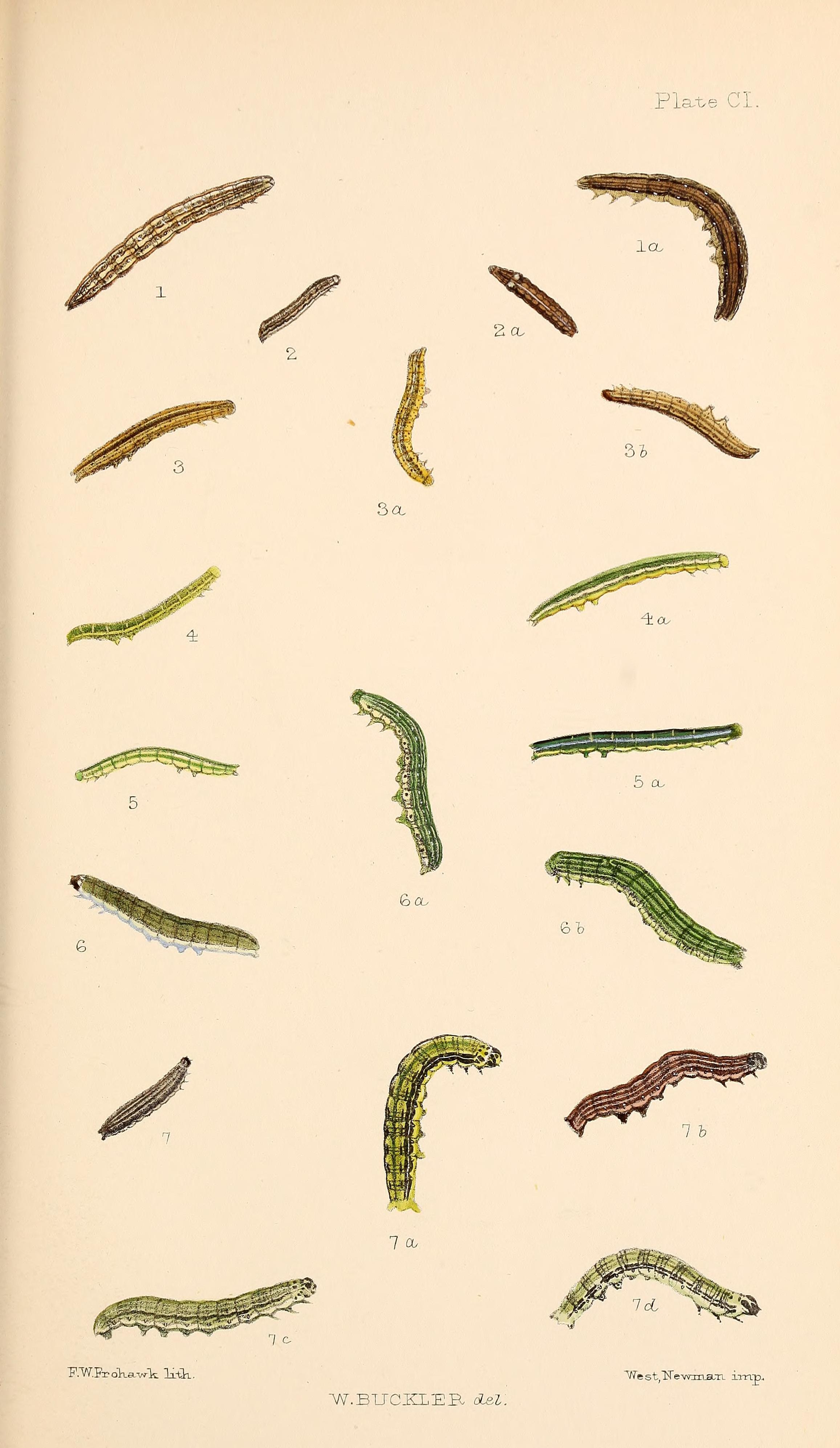
Figs.5, 5a larvae in various stages of growth

== Biology ==
The moth flies from May to September depending on the location.

Larva green with the dorsal line darker; the subdorsal lines whitish; the spiracular pale yellow. The larvae feed on various grasses and Carex species.
