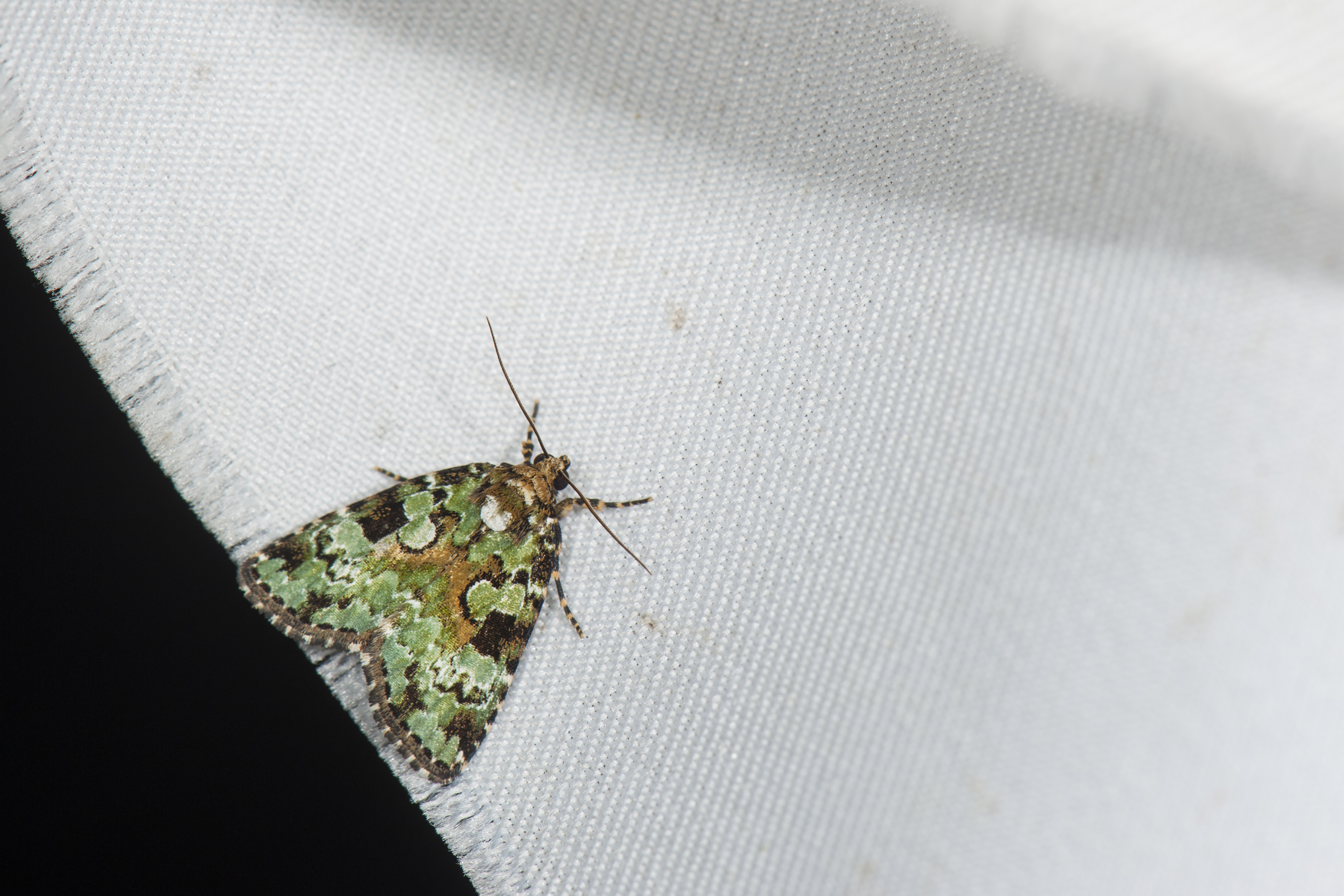

Scientific classification
- Kingdom: Animalia
- Phylum: Arthropoda
- Class: Insecta
- Order: Lepidoptera
- Superfamily: Noctuoidea
- Family: Noctuidae
- Genus: Koyaga
- Species: K. viriditincta

Binomial name
- Koyaga viriditincta (Wileman, 1915)

Synonyms
- Lithacodia viriditincta Wileman, 1915

= Koyaga viriditincta =

Species of moth

Koyaga viriditincta is a species of moth of the family Noctuidae first described by Alfred Ernest Wileman in 1915. It is found in Taiwan.

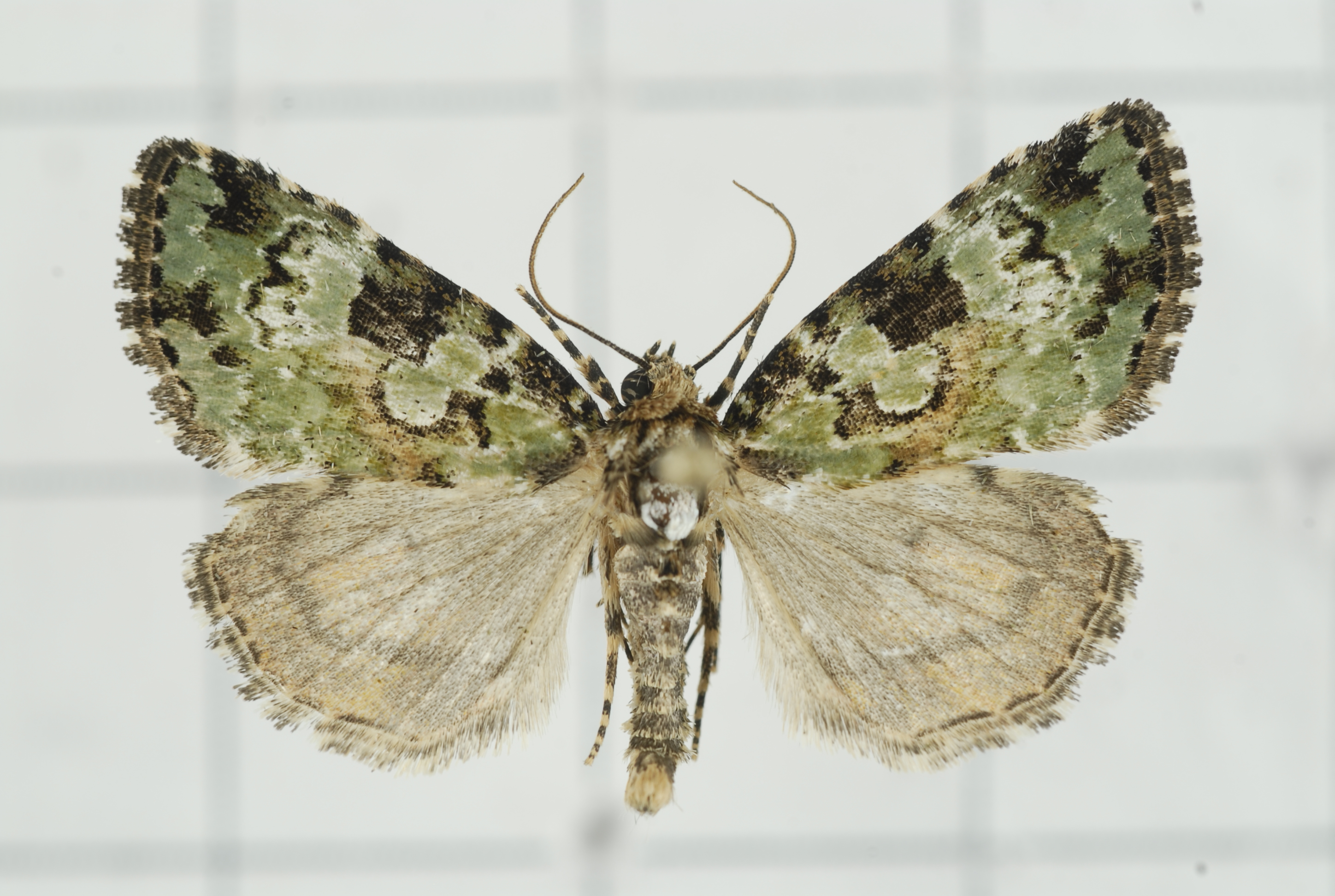
A picture of the moth's body.
