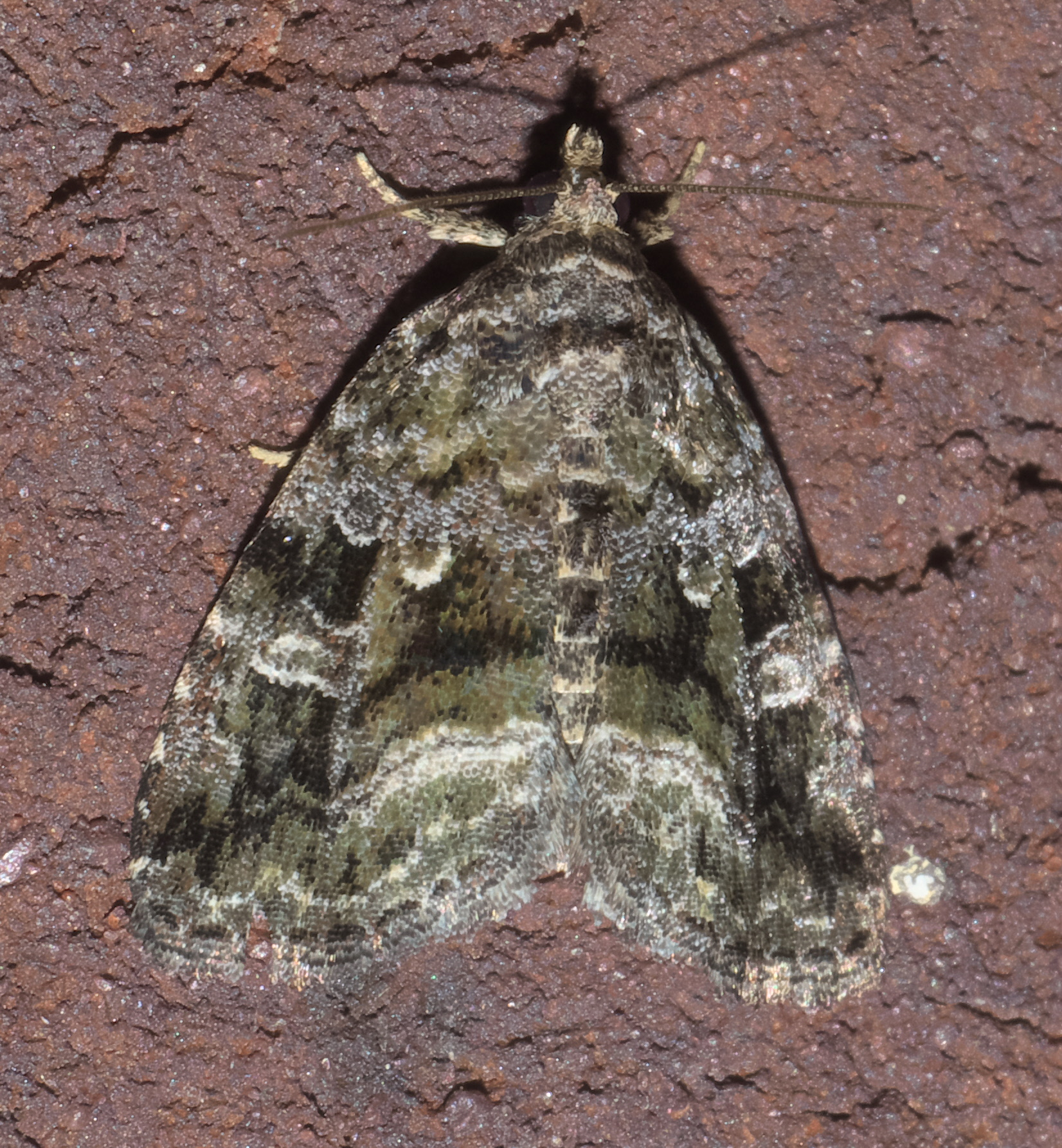

Scientific classification
- Kingdom: Animalia
- Phylum: Arthropoda
- Clade: Pancrustacea
- Class: Insecta
- Order: Lepidoptera
- Superfamily: Noctuoidea
- Family: Noctuidae
- Genus: Protodeltote
- Species: P. muscosula

Binomial name
- Protodeltote muscosula (Guenée, 1852)

= Protodeltote muscosula =

Species of moth

Protodeltote muscosula, the large mossy lithacodia, is an owlet moth (family Noctuidae). The species was first described by Achille Guenée in 1852. Larvae feed on swamp grasses, in particular, saw grass. Adults have a wingspan of 19-23mm. The MONA or Hodges number for Protodeltote muscosula is 9047.

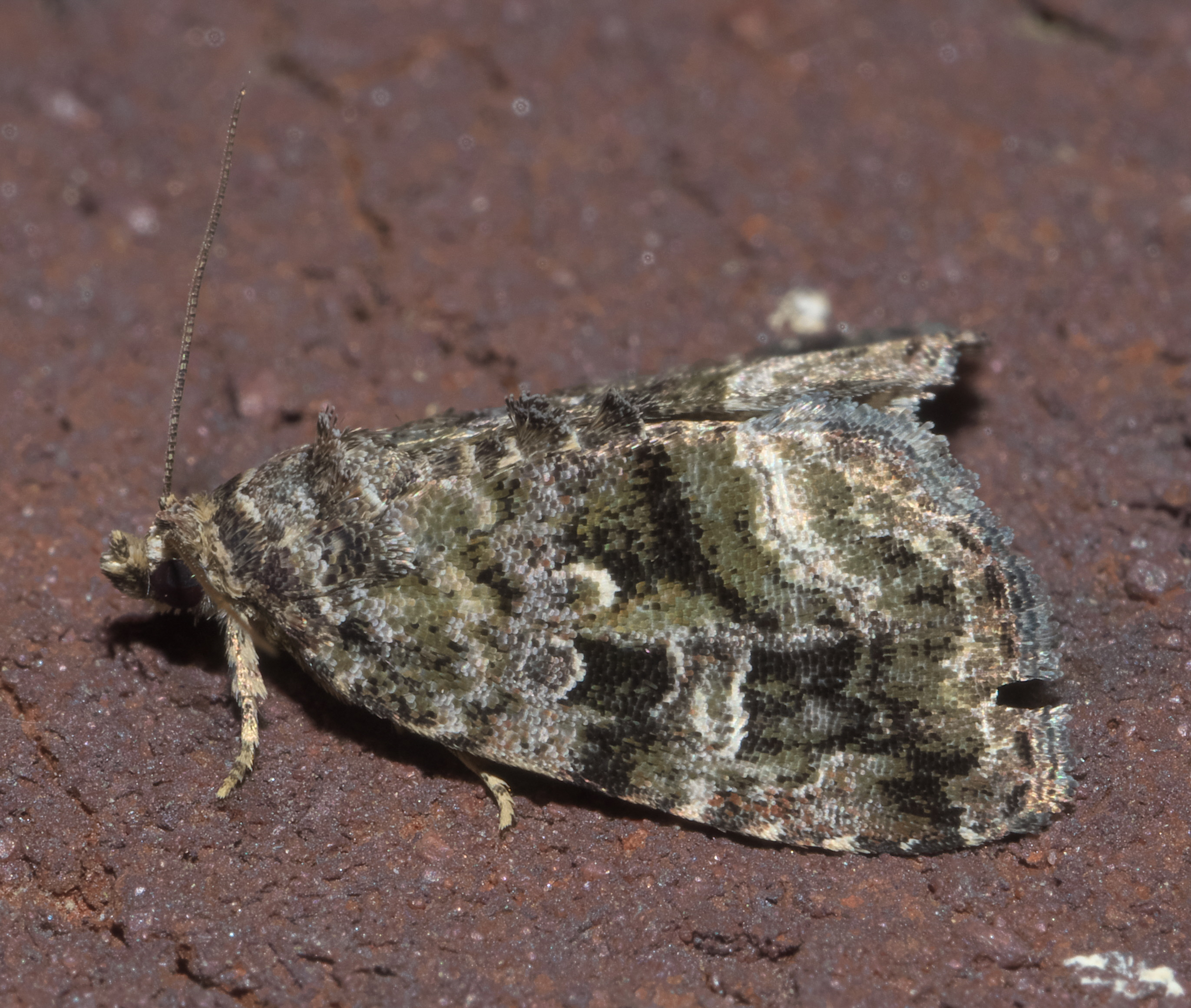
Large mossy lithacodia, Protodeltote muscosula
