= Pseudeustrotia indeterminata =

Scientific classification
- Kingdom: Animalia
- Phylum: Arthropoda
- Clade: Pancrustacea
- Class: Insecta
- Order: Lepidoptera
- Superfamily: Noctuoidea
- Family: Noctuidae
- Genus: Pseudeustrotia
- Species: P. indeterminata

Binomial name
- Pseudeustrotia indeterminata (Barnes & McDunnough, 1918)

Species of moth

Pseudeustrotia indeterminata is a species of cutworm or dart moth in the family Noctuidae. It was described by William Barnes and James Halliday McDunnough in 1918 and is found in North America.

The MONA or Hodges number for Pseudeustrotia indeterminata is 9054.
