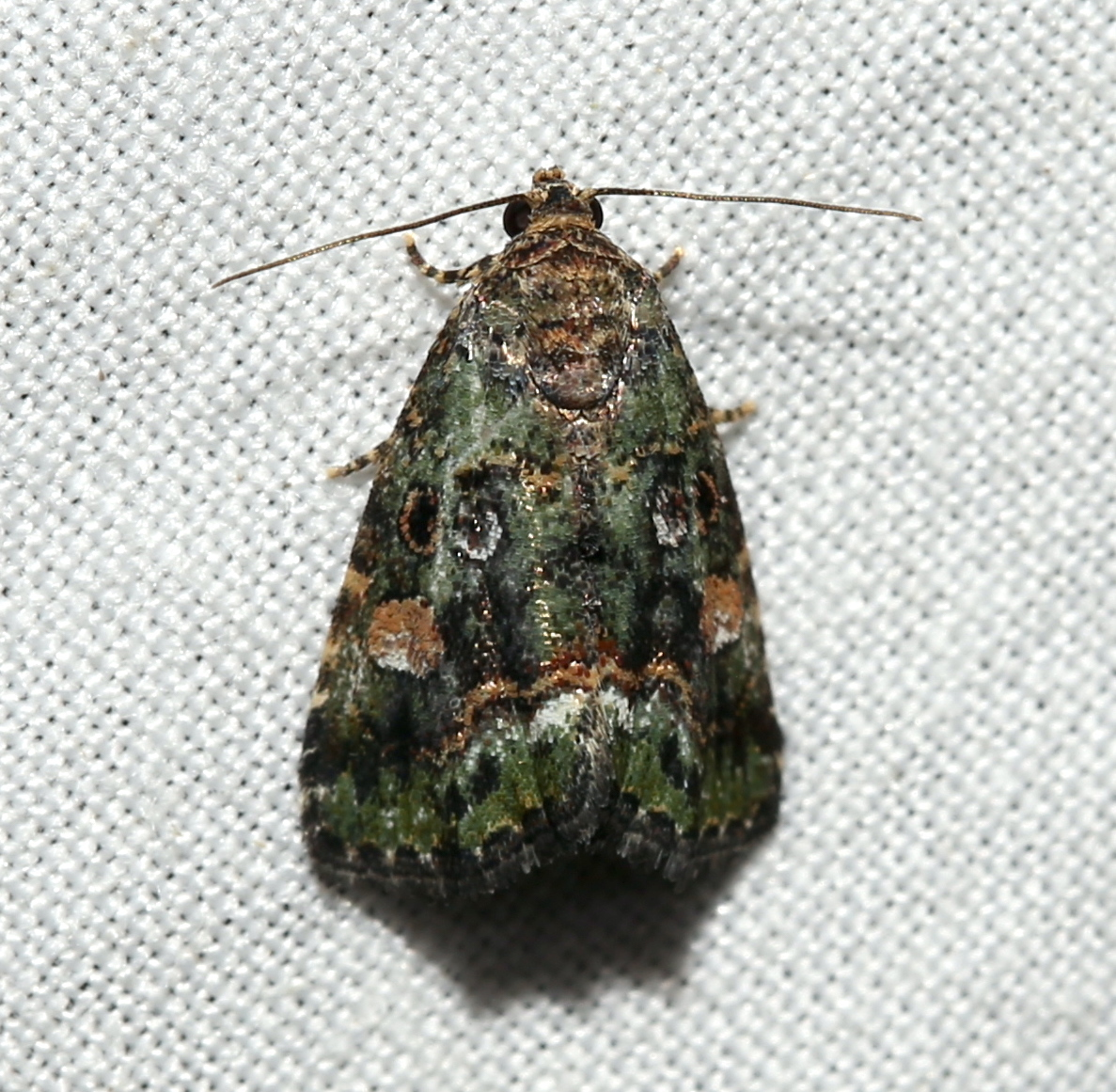

Scientific classification
- Kingdom: Animalia
- Phylum: Arthropoda
- Clade: Pancrustacea
- Class: Insecta
- Order: Lepidoptera
- Superfamily: Noctuoidea
- Family: Noctuidae
- Genus: Deltote
- Species: D. musta

Binomial name
- Deltote musta (Grote & Robinson, 1868)

Synonyms
- Erastria musta Grote & Robinson, 1868; Lithacodia musta; Eustrotia musta

= Deltote musta =

Small mossy lithacodia moth

Species of moth

Deltote musta, the small mossy lithacodia moth, is a moth of the family Noctuidae. The species was first described by Augustus Radcliffe Grote and Coleman Townsend Robinson in 1868. It is found in the US from New Hampshire to Florida, west to Arizona and north to Wisconsin.

The wingspan is 15–19 mm. Adults are on wing from May to September.
