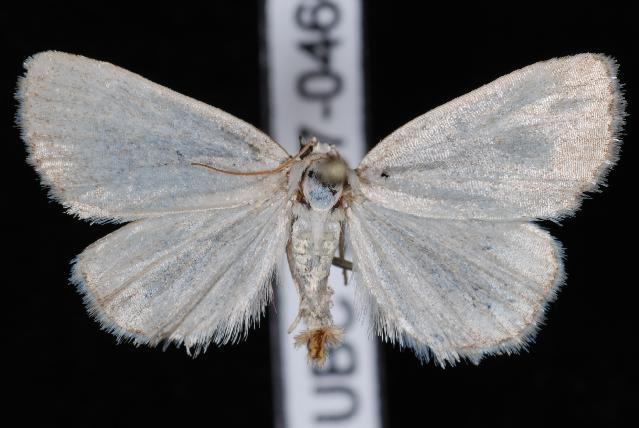

Scientific classification
- Kingdom: Animalia
- Phylum: Arthropoda
- Class: Insecta
- Order: Lepidoptera
- Superfamily: Noctuoidea
- Family: Noctuidae
- Genus: Protodeltote
- Species: P. albidula

Binomial name
- Protodeltote albidula (Guenee, 1852)

Synonyms
- • Erastria albidula Guenée, 1852 • Nonagria intractabilis Walker, 1860 • Conchylis cretiferana Walker, 1863 • Lithacodia albidula (Guenée, 1852)

= Protodeltote albidula =

Species of moth

Protodeltote albidula, the pale glyph, is an owlet moth (family Noctuidae). The species was first described by Achille Guenée in 1852.

The MONA or Hodges number for Protodeltote albidula is 9048.
