= Koyaga numisma =

Scientific classification
- Domain: Eukaryota
- Kingdom: Animalia
- Phylum: Arthropoda
- Class: Insecta
- Order: Lepidoptera
- Superfamily: Noctuoidea
- Family: Noctuidae
- Genus: Koyaga
- Species: K. numisma

Binomial name
- Koyaga numisma (Staudinger, 1888)

Synonyms
- Erastria numisma Staudinger, 1888; Lithacodia numisma Hampson, 1910; Jaspidia numisma Inoue & Sugi, 1958

Species of moth

Koyaga numisma is a species of moth of the family Noctuidae first described by Otto Staudinger in 1888. It is found in Russia, China, Korea and Japan.

The length of the forewings is 8–11 mm. The forewings are dark brown suffused with olive brown especially on medial and postmedial areas. The hindwings are white sprinkled with golden brown.
