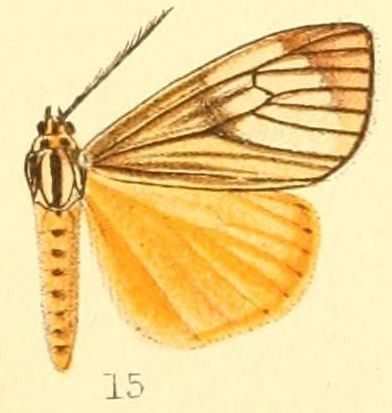
- Secusio mania

Scientific classification
- Kingdom: Animalia
- Phylum: Arthropoda
- Class: Insecta
- Order: Lepidoptera
- Superfamily: Noctuoidea
- Family: Erebidae
- Subfamily: Arctiinae
- Tribe: Arctiini
- Genus: Secusio; Walker, 1854

Type species
- Secusio strigata Walker, 1854

Species
- See text

= Secusio =

Genus of moths

Secusio is a genus of moths in the subfamily Arctiinae first described by Francis Walker in 1854.

== Species ==
- Secusio abdominalis Rothschild, 1910
- Secusio ansorgei W. Rothschild, 1933
- Secusio atrizonata Hampson, 1910
- Secusio deilemera Talbot, 1929
- Secusio deilemerana Strand, 1909
- Secusio discoidalis Talbot, 1929
- Secusio drucei W. Rothschild, 1933
- Secusio griseipennis Hampson, 1911
- Secusio hymenaea Gerstaecker, 1919
- Secusio intensa W. Rothschild, 1933
- Secusio javanica Roepke, 1940
- Secusio mania Druce, 1888
- Secusio monteironis W. Rothschild, 1933
- Secusio parvipuncta Hampson, 1891
- Secusio postmedialis Strand, 1919
- Secusio quadripunctata Aurivillius, 1900
- Secusio rothi Rothschild, 1933
- Secusio sansibarensis Strand, 1909
- Secusio sansibariensis Gaede, 1926
- Secusio strigata Walker, 1854
- Secusio strigata Hampson, 1894

== Former species ==
- Secusio gaetana Oberthür, 1923
