= Lemyra toxopei =

Scientific classification
- Domain: Eukaryota
- Kingdom: Animalia
- Phylum: Arthropoda
- Class: Insecta
- Order: Lepidoptera
- Superfamily: Noctuoidea
- Family: Erebidae
- Subfamily: Arctiinae
- Genus: Lemyra
- Species: L. toxopei

Binomial name
- Lemyra toxopei (Roepke, 1946)

Synonyms
- Allochrista toxopei Roepke, 1946

Species of moth

Lemyra toxopei is a moth of the family Erebidae. It was described by Roepke in 1946. It is found on Sulawesi.
