= Lemyra jiangxiensis =

Scientific classification
- Kingdom: Animalia
- Phylum: Arthropoda
- Clade: Pancrustacea
- Class: Insecta
- Order: Lepidoptera
- Superfamily: Noctuoidea
- Family: Erebidae
- Subfamily: Arctiinae
- Genus: Lemyra
- Species: L. jiangxiensis

Binomial name
- Lemyra jiangxiensis (C.-L. Fang, 1990)

Species of moth

Lemyra jiangxiensis is a moth of the family Erebidae. It was described by Cheng-Lai Fang in 1990. It is found in China in Guangdong, Jiangxi, Hunan, Shanghai and Zhejiang.

== Subspecies ==
- Lemyra jiangxiensis jiangxiensis (China: Jiangxi, Hunan, Shanghai, Zhejiang)
- Lemyra jiangxiensis fangae Dubatolov, Kishida & Wang, 2008 (China: Guangdong)
