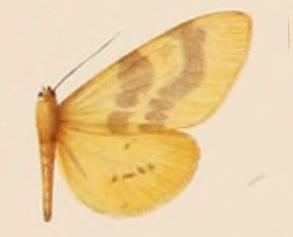

Scientific classification
- Domain: Eukaryota
- Kingdom: Animalia
- Phylum: Arthropoda
- Class: Insecta
- Order: Lepidoptera
- Superfamily: Noctuoidea
- Family: Erebidae
- Subfamily: Arctiinae
- Genus: Lemyra
- Species: L. kannegieteri

Binomial name
- Lemyra kannegieteri (Rothschild, 1910)

Synonyms
- Diacrisia kannegieteri Rothschild, 1910; Spilosoma kannegieteri

= Lemyra kannegieteri =

Species of moth

Lemyra kannegieteri is a moth of the family Erebidae first described by Walter Rothschild in 1910. It is found on Nias, an island located off the western coast of Sumatra, Indonesia.
