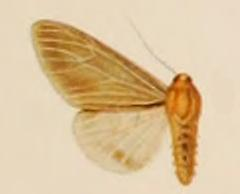

Scientific classification
- Domain: Eukaryota
- Kingdom: Animalia
- Phylum: Arthropoda
- Class: Insecta
- Order: Lepidoptera
- Superfamily: Noctuoidea
- Family: Erebidae
- Subfamily: Arctiinae
- Genus: Lemyra
- Species: L. venosa

Binomial name
- Lemyra venosa (Moore, 1879)

Synonyms
- Carbisa venosa Moore, 1879; Diacrisia pseudomaenas Rothschild, 1919

= Lemyra venosa =

Species of moth

Lemyra venosa is a moth of the family Erebidae first described by Frederic Moore in 1879. It is found in India in Sikkim and the Khasia Hills and in Bhutan.
