= Lemyra costalis =

Scientific classification
- Domain: Eukaryota
- Kingdom: Animalia
- Phylum: Arthropoda
- Class: Insecta
- Order: Lepidoptera
- Superfamily: Noctuoidea
- Family: Erebidae
- Subfamily: Arctiinae
- Genus: Lemyra
- Species: L. costalis

Binomial name
- Lemyra costalis J. Singh & A. Singh, 1998

Species of moth

Lemyra costalis is a moth of the family Erebidae. It was described by Jagbir Singh and A. Singh in 1998. It is found in Assam, India. Its taxonomy is known as " class Insecta".
