= Lemyra kuangtungensis =

Scientific classification
- Kingdom: Animalia
- Phylum: Arthropoda
- Clade: Pancrustacea
- Class: Insecta
- Order: Lepidoptera
- Superfamily: Noctuoidea
- Family: Erebidae
- Subfamily: Arctiinae
- Genus: Lemyra
- Species: L. kuangtungensis

Binomial name
- Lemyra kuangtungensis (Daniel, 1954)

Synonyms
- Spilarctia kuangtungensis Daniel, 1954

Species of moth

Lemyra kuangtungensis is a moth of the family Erebidae. It was described by Franz Daniel in 1954. It is found in China (Guangdong, Jiangxi, Guangxi, Hunan, Hainan).
