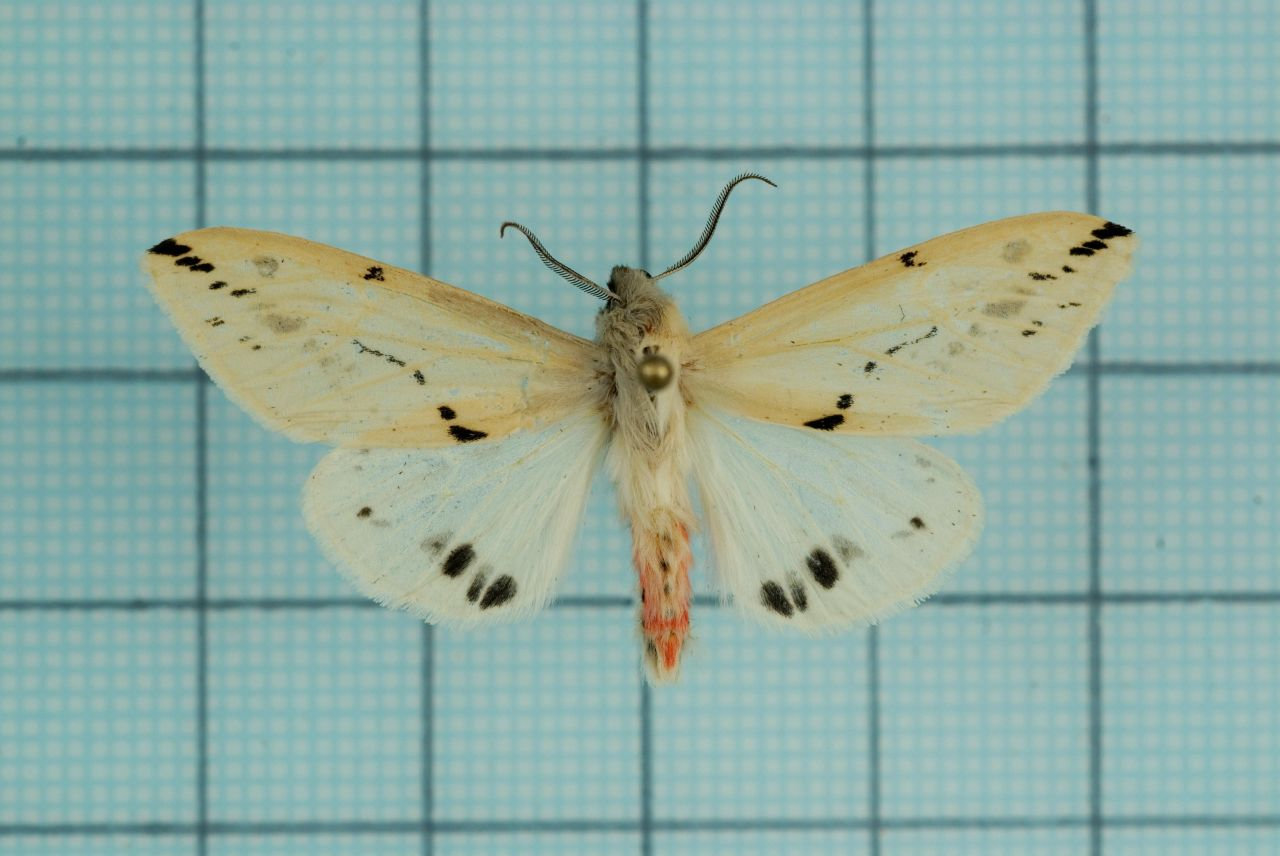

Scientific classification
- Kingdom: Animalia
- Phylum: Arthropoda
- Class: Insecta
- Order: Lepidoptera
- Superfamily: Noctuoidea
- Family: Erebidae
- Subfamily: Arctiinae
- Genus: Lemyra
- Species: L. wernerthomasi

Binomial name
- Lemyra wernerthomasi Inoue, 1993

= Lemyra wernerthomasi =

Species of moth

Lemyra wernerthomasi is a moth in the family Erebidae first described by Hiroshi Inoue in 1993. It is found in Taiwan.
