= Lemyra pilosoides =

Scientific classification
- Domain: Eukaryota
- Kingdom: Animalia
- Phylum: Arthropoda
- Class: Insecta
- Order: Lepidoptera
- Superfamily: Noctuoidea
- Family: Erebidae
- Subfamily: Arctiinae
- Genus: Lemyra
- Species: L. pilosoides

Binomial name
- Lemyra pilosoides (Daniel, 1943)

Synonyms
- Spilarctia pilosoides Daniel, 1943; Spilosoma pilosoides

Species of moth

Lemyra pilosoides is a moth of the family Erebidae. It was described by Franz Daniel in 1943. It is found in the Chinese provinces of Yunnan and Sichuan.
