= Lemyra rubrocollaris =

Scientific classification
- Domain: Eukaryota
- Kingdom: Animalia
- Phylum: Arthropoda
- Class: Insecta
- Order: Lepidoptera
- Superfamily: Noctuoidea
- Family: Erebidae
- Subfamily: Arctiinae
- Genus: Lemyra
- Species: L. rubrocollaris

Binomial name
- Lemyra rubrocollaris (Reich, 1937)

Synonyms
- Diacrisia rubrocollaris Reich, 1937; Spilosoma rubrocollaris

Species of moth

Lemyra rubrocollaris is a moth of the family Erebidae. It was described by Reich in 1937. It is found in China (Jiangsu).
