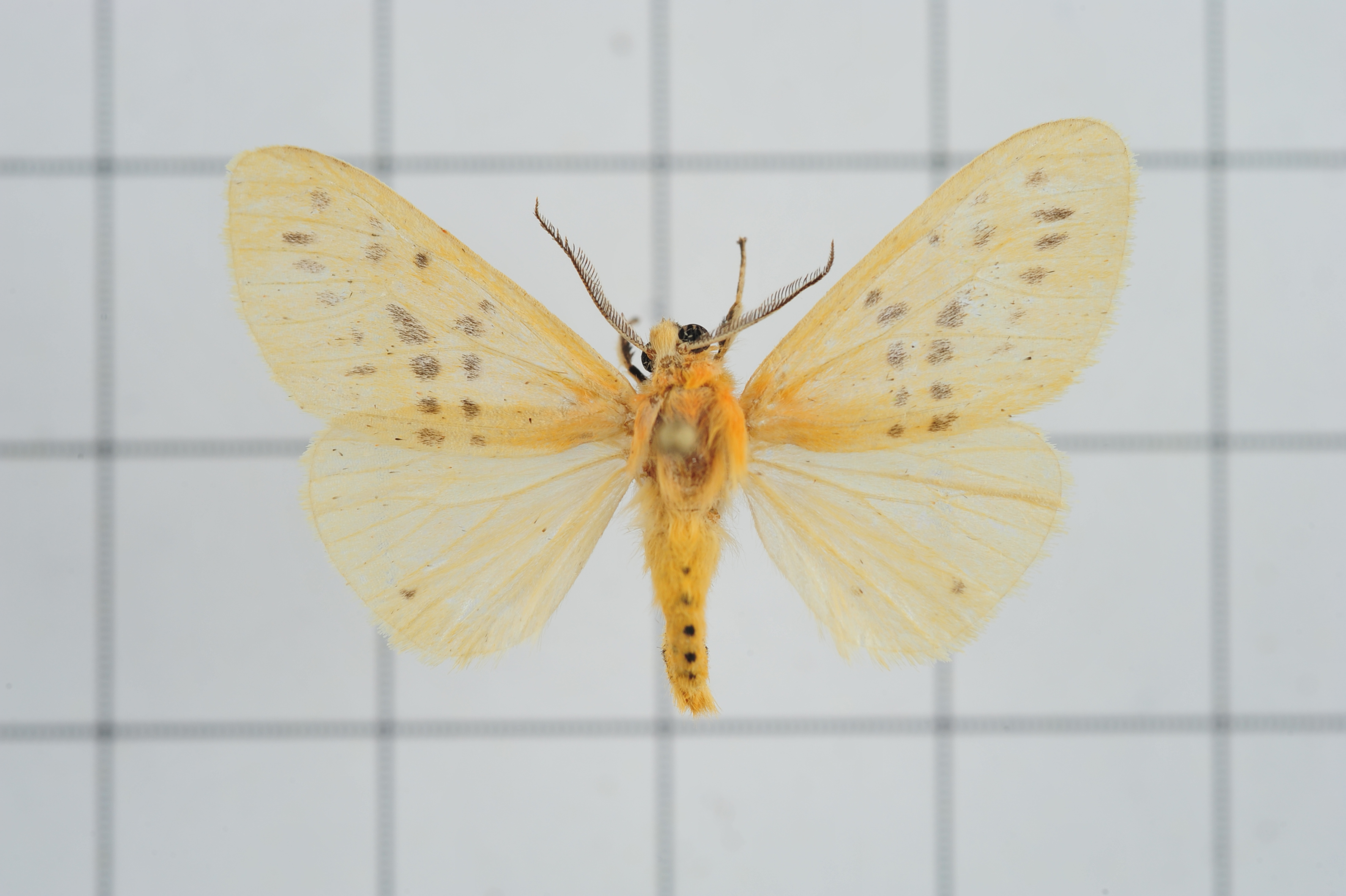

Scientific classification
- Kingdom: Animalia
- Phylum: Arthropoda
- Class: Insecta
- Order: Lepidoptera
- Superfamily: Noctuoidea
- Family: Erebidae
- Subfamily: Arctiinae
- Genus: Lemyra
- Species: L. moltrechti

Binomial name
- Lemyra moltrechti (Miyake, 1909)

Synonyms
- Spilosoma moltrechti Miyake, 1909; Diacrisia ukona Matsumura, 1930

= Lemyra moltrechti =

Species of moth

Lemyra moltrechti is a moth of the family Erebidae. It was described by Tsunekata Miyake in 1909. It is found in Taiwan. It is named after the collector Arnold Moltrecht.
