= Lemyra anormala =

Scientific classification
- Domain: Eukaryota
- Kingdom: Animalia
- Phylum: Arthropoda
- Class: Insecta
- Order: Lepidoptera
- Superfamily: Noctuoidea
- Family: Erebidae
- Subfamily: Arctiinae
- Genus: Lemyra
- Species: L. anormala

Binomial name
- Lemyra anormala (Daniel, 1943)

Synonyms
- Spilarctia anormala Daniel, 1943

Species of moth

Lemyra anormala is a moth of the family Erebidae. It was described by Franz Daniel in 1943. It is found in China (Sichuan, Hubei, Yunnan, Zhejiang, Hunan, Fujian, Jiangxi, Shaanxi, Guizhou, Tibet), Burma, and Vietnam.

== Subspecies ==
- Lemyra anormala anormala (Burma, Vietnam, China: Yunnan, Sichuan, Guizhou, Tibet)
- Lemyra anormala danieli Thomas, 1990 (China: Zhejiang, Hunan, Fujian, Jiangxi, Hubei, Shaanxi)
