= Lemyra sordidescens =

Scientific classification
- Domain: Eukaryota
- Kingdom: Animalia
- Phylum: Arthropoda
- Class: Insecta
- Order: Lepidoptera
- Superfamily: Noctuoidea
- Family: Erebidae
- Subfamily: Arctiinae
- Genus: Lemyra
- Species: L. sordidescens

Binomial name
- Lemyra sordidescens (Hampson, 1901)

Synonyms
- Diacrisia sordidescens Hampson, 1901; Spilosoma sordida Moore, 1865

Species of insect

Lemyra sordidescens is a moth of the family Erebidae. It was described by George Hampson in 1901. It is found in India (Sikkim, Assam) and Myanmar.
