= Lemyra murzinorum =

Scientific classification
- Kingdom: Animalia
- Phylum: Arthropoda
- Clade: Pancrustacea
- Class: Insecta
- Order: Lepidoptera
- Superfamily: Noctuoidea
- Family: Erebidae
- Subfamily: Arctiinae
- Genus: Lemyra
- Species: L. murzinorum

Binomial name
- Lemyra murzinorum Dubatolov, 2007

Species of moth

Lemyra murzinorum is a moth of the family Erebidae. It was described by Vladimir Viktorovitch Dubatolov in 2007. It is found in Sichuan, China.
