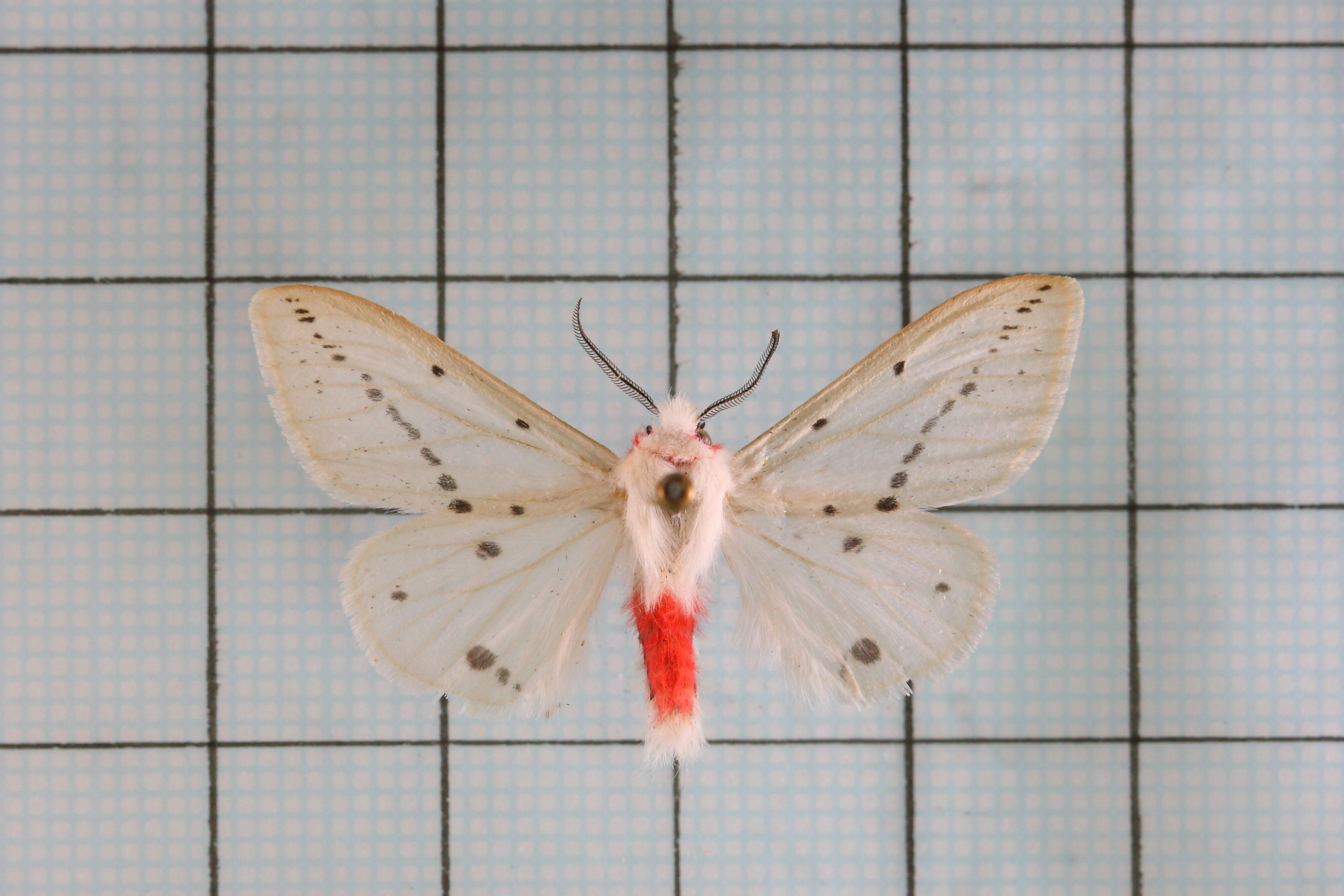

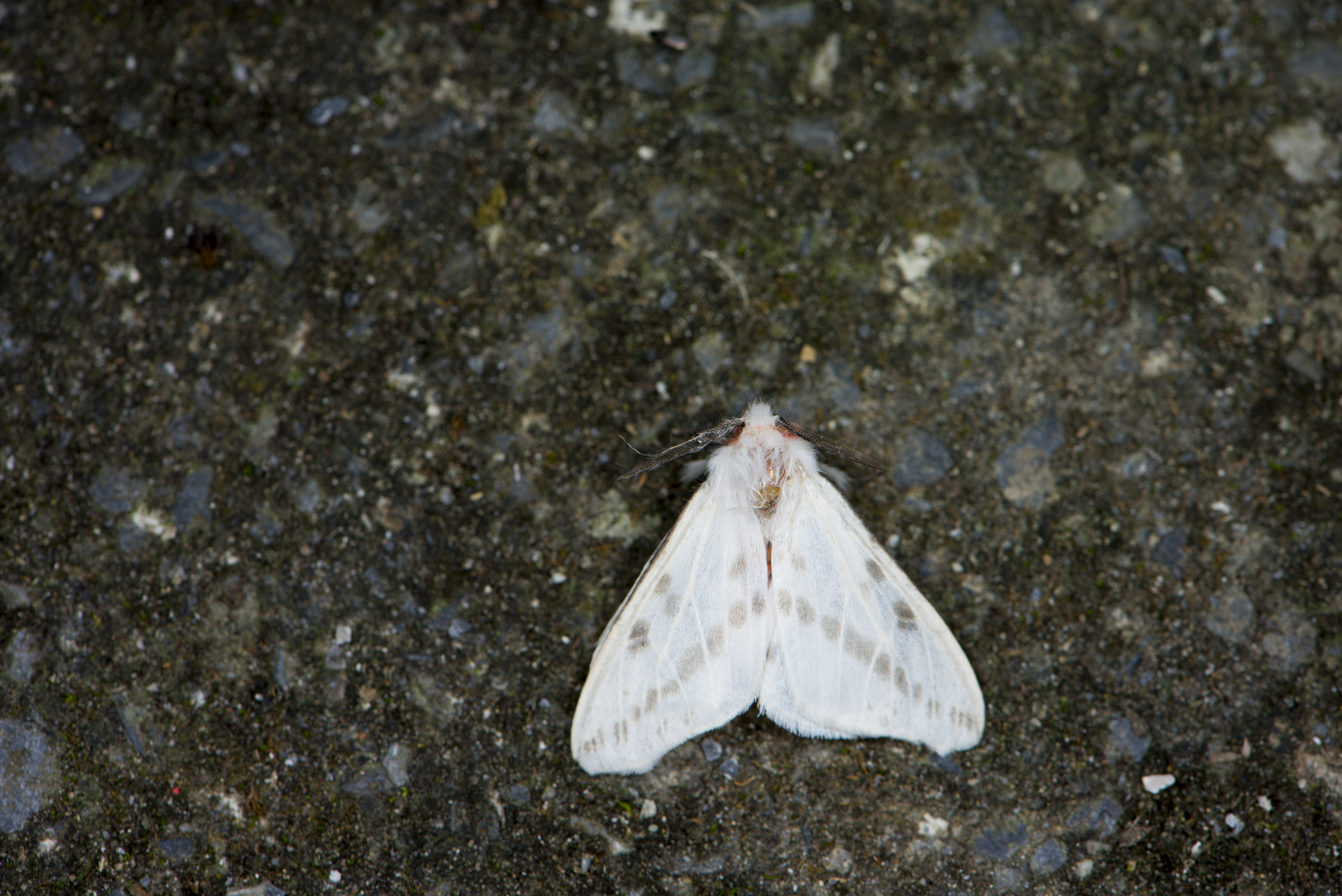

Scientific classification
- Kingdom: Animalia
- Phylum: Arthropoda
- Class: Insecta
- Order: Lepidoptera
- Superfamily: Noctuoidea
- Family: Erebidae
- Subfamily: Arctiinae
- Genus: Lemyra
- Species: L. rhodophiloides

Binomial name
- Lemyra rhodophiloides (Hampson, 1909)

Synonyms
- Diacrisia rhodophiloides Hampson, 1909; Lemyra rhodophilodes (Hampson, 1909); Diacrisia rhodophilodes f. shironis

= Lemyra rhodophiloides =

Species of moth

Lemyra rhodophiloides is a moth in the family Erebidae first described by George Hampson in 1909. It is found in Taiwan and Japan.

The wingspan is 27–40 mm.
