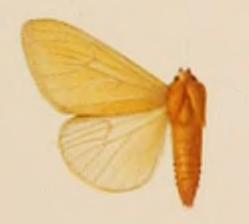

Scientific classification
- Domain: Eukaryota
- Kingdom: Animalia
- Phylum: Arthropoda
- Class: Insecta
- Order: Lepidoptera
- Superfamily: Noctuoidea
- Family: Erebidae
- Subfamily: Arctiinae
- Genus: Lemyra
- Species: L. pilosa

Binomial name
- Lemyra pilosa (Rothschild, 1910)

Synonyms
- Diacrisia pilosa Rothschild, 1910; Spilosoma pilosa

= Lemyra pilosa =

Species of moth

Lemyra pilosa is a moth of the family Erebidae first described by Walter Rothschild in 1910. It is found in the Khasia Hills of India and Yunnan, China.
