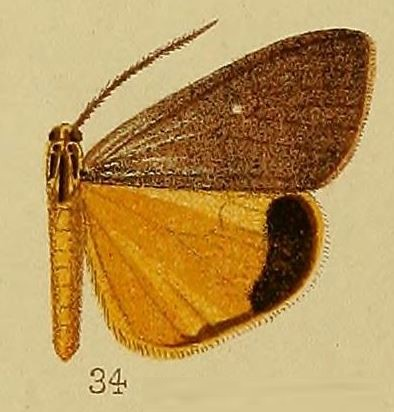

Scientific classification
- Kingdom: Animalia
- Phylum: Arthropoda
- Class: Insecta
- Order: Lepidoptera
- Superfamily: Noctuoidea
- Family: Erebidae
- Subfamily: Arctiinae
- Genus: Secusio
- Species: S. atrizonata

Binomial name
- Secusio atrizonata Hampson, 1910

= Secusio atrizonata =

Species of moth

Secusio atrizonata is a moth in the family Erebidae. It was described by George Hampson in 1910. It is found in Zambia.
