= Lemyra pectorale =

Scientific classification
- Domain: Eukaryota
- Kingdom: Animalia
- Phylum: Arthropoda
- Class: Insecta
- Order: Lepidoptera
- Superfamily: Noctuoidea
- Family: Erebidae
- Subfamily: Arctiinae
- Genus: Lemyra
- Species: L. pectorale

Binomial name
- Lemyra pectorale Černý, 2009

Species of moth

Lemyra pectorale is a moth of the family Erebidae. It was described by Karel Černý in 2009. It is found in Thailand.
