= Lemyra sincera =

Scientific classification
- Kingdom: Animalia
- Phylum: Arthropoda
- Clade: Pancrustacea
- Class: Insecta
- Order: Lepidoptera
- Superfamily: Noctuoidea
- Family: Erebidae
- Subfamily: Arctiinae
- Genus: Lemyra
- Species: L. sincera

Binomial name
- Lemyra sincera C.-L. Fang, 1993

Species of moth

Lemyra sincera is a moth of the family Erebidae. It was described by Cheng-Lai Fang in 1993. It is found in Yunnan, China.
