= Lemyra spilosomata =

Scientific classification
- Kingdom: Animalia
- Phylum: Arthropoda
- Class: Insecta
- Order: Lepidoptera
- Superfamily: Noctuoidea
- Family: Erebidae
- Subfamily: Arctiinae
- Genus: Lemyra
- Species: L. spilosomata

Binomial name
- Lemyra spilosomata (Walker, [1865])

Synonyms
- Thyrgorina spilosomata Walker, [1865]; Echlida subjecta Walker, 1865; Diacrisia albens Rothschild, 1910; Diacrisia flavifrons Rothschild, 1910

Species of moth

Lemyra spilosomata is a moth of the family Erebidae. It was described by Francis Walker in 1865. It is found in southern India.
