= Lemyra ypsilon =

Scientific classification
- Domain: Eukaryota
- Kingdom: Animalia
- Phylum: Arthropoda
- Class: Insecta
- Order: Lepidoptera
- Superfamily: Noctuoidea
- Family: Erebidae
- Subfamily: Arctiinae
- Genus: Lemyra
- Species: L. ypsilon

Binomial name
- Lemyra ypsilon (Rothschild, 1910)

Synonyms
- Maenas ypsilon Rothschild, 1910; Paralacydes ypsilon; Maenas ypsilon furcatulata Van Eecke, 1927

Species of moth

Lemyra ypsilon is a moth of the family Erebidae. It was described by Walter Rothschild in 1910. It is found in Sundaland, Java, Borneo and Malaysia (Malacca). The habitat consists of lower montane forests and hill dipterocarp forests.

Adults have pale cream wings.
