= Lemyra neglecta =

Scientific classification
- Domain: Eukaryota
- Kingdom: Animalia
- Phylum: Arthropoda
- Class: Insecta
- Order: Lepidoptera
- Superfamily: Noctuoidea
- Family: Erebidae
- Subfamily: Arctiinae
- Genus: Lemyra
- Species: L. neglecta

Binomial name
- Lemyra neglecta (Rothschild, 1910)

Synonyms
- Diacrisia neglecta Rothschild, 1910

Species of moth

Lemyra neglecta is a moth of the family Erebidae. It was described by Walter Rothschild in 1910. It is found in India (Sikkim, Assam, Darjiling), Nepal, Myanmar and China (Tibet, Yunnan).
