= Lemyra pseudoflammeoida =

Scientific classification
- Kingdom: Animalia
- Phylum: Arthropoda
- Clade: Pancrustacea
- Class: Insecta
- Order: Lepidoptera
- Superfamily: Noctuoidea
- Family: Erebidae
- Subfamily: Arctiinae
- Genus: Lemyra
- Species: L. pseudoflammeoida

Binomial name
- Lemyra pseudoflammeoida (C.-L. Fang, 1983)

Species of moth

Lemyra pseudoflammeoida is a moth of the family Erebidae. It was described by Cheng-Lai Fang in 1983. It is found in Jiangxi, China.
