= Lemyra flaveola =

Scientific classification
- Kingdom: Animalia
- Phylum: Arthropoda
- Clade: Pancrustacea
- Class: Insecta
- Order: Lepidoptera
- Superfamily: Noctuoidea
- Family: Erebidae
- Subfamily: Arctiinae
- Genus: Lemyra
- Species: L. flaveola

Binomial name
- Lemyra flaveola (Leech, 1899)

Synonyms
- Spilosoma flaveolum Leech, 1899; Lemyra flaveolum (Leech, 1899)

Species of moth

Lemyra flaveola is a moth of the family Erebidae. It was described by John Henry Leech in 1899. It is found in western China (Sichuan, Jiangxi).
