= Lemyra costimacula =

Scientific classification
- Domain: Eukaryota
- Kingdom: Animalia
- Phylum: Arthropoda
- Class: Insecta
- Order: Lepidoptera
- Superfamily: Noctuoidea
- Family: Erebidae
- Subfamily: Arctiinae
- Genus: Lemyra
- Species: L. costimacula

Binomial name
- Lemyra costimacula (Leech, 1899)

Synonyms
- Thyrgorina costimacula Leech, 1899; Diacrisia costimacula

Species of moth

Lemyra costimacula is a moth of the family Erebidae. It was described by John Henry Leech in 1899. It is found in China (Sichuan and Yunnan).
