= Lemyra hyalina =

Scientific classification
- Kingdom: Animalia
- Phylum: Arthropoda
- Clade: Pancrustacea
- Class: Insecta
- Order: Lepidoptera
- Superfamily: Noctuoidea
- Family: Erebidae
- Subfamily: Arctiinae
- Genus: Lemyra
- Species: L. hyalina

Binomial name
- Lemyra hyalina C.-L. Fang, 1990

Species of moth

Lemyra hyalina is a moth of the family Erebidae. It was described by Cheng-Lai Fang in 1990. It is found in China in Guangxi and Guangdong.

== Subspecies ==
- Lemyra hyalina hyalina (China: Guangxi)
- Lemyra hyalina nanlingica Dubatolov, Kishida & Wang, 2008 (China: Guangdong)
