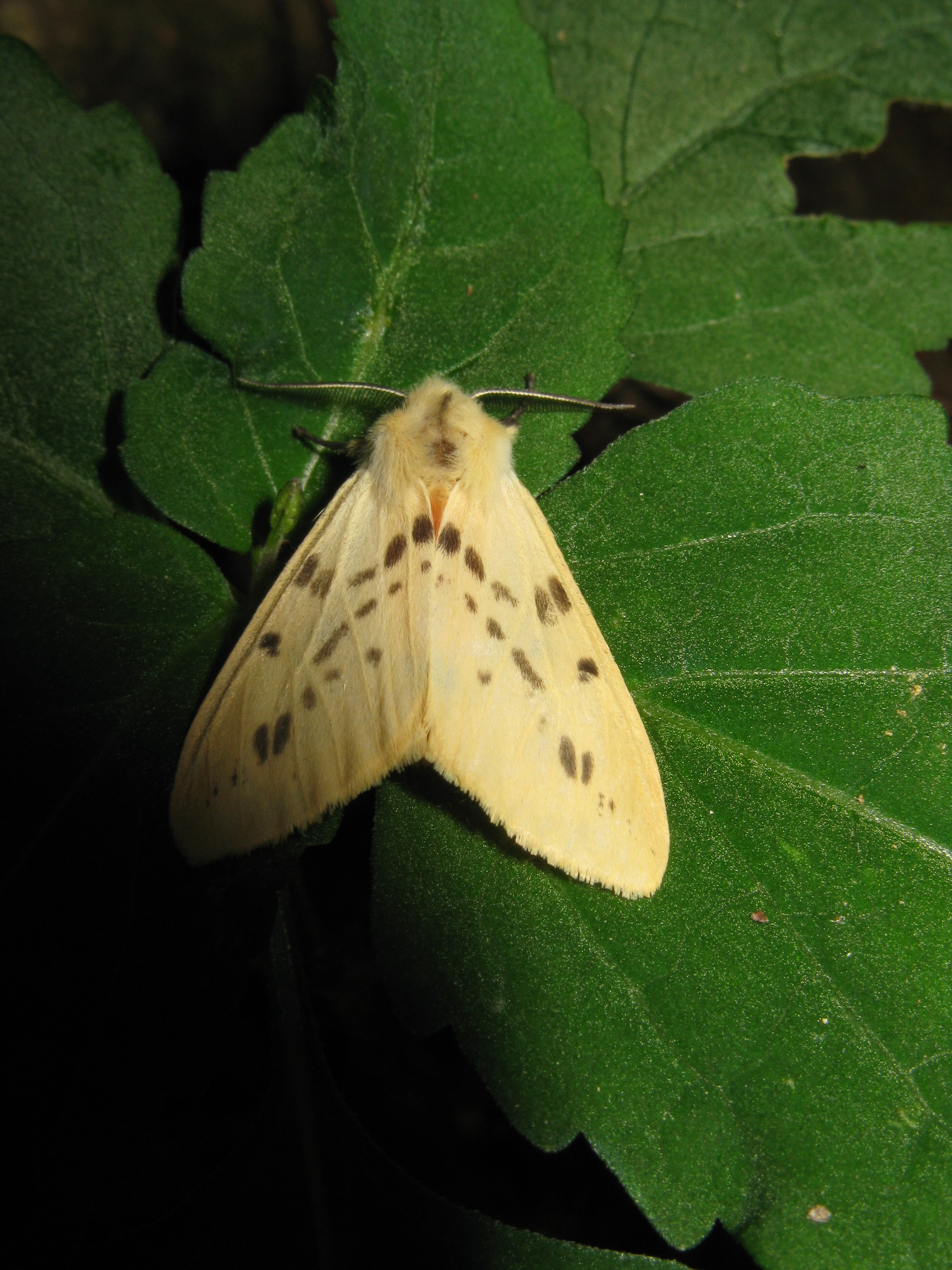

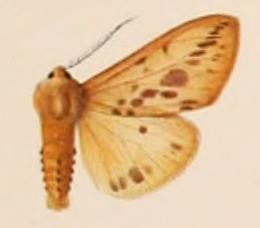

Scientific classification
- Domain: Eukaryota
- Kingdom: Animalia
- Phylum: Arthropoda
- Class: Insecta
- Order: Lepidoptera
- Superfamily: Noctuoidea
- Family: Erebidae
- Subfamily: Arctiinae
- Genus: Lemyra
- Species: L. inaequalis

Binomial name
- Lemyra inaequalis (Butler, 1879)

Synonyms
- Spilarctia inaequalis Butler, 1879; Spilosoma inaequalis; Thanatarctia inaequalis; Diacrisia pseudolutea Rothschild, 1910; Diacrisia pseudolutea Rothschild, 1911; Diacrisia rhodophila japonensis Rothschild, 1914; Diacrisia sakaguchii Matsumura, 1930

= Lemyra inaequalis =

Species of moth

Lemyra inaequalis is a moth of the family Erebidae first described by Arthur Gardiner Butler in 1879. It is found in Japan and Korea.

== Subspecies ==
- Lemyra inaequalis inaequalis (Japan, south to Yaku)
- Lemyra inaequalis sakaguchii (Matsumura, 1930) (Okinawa)
