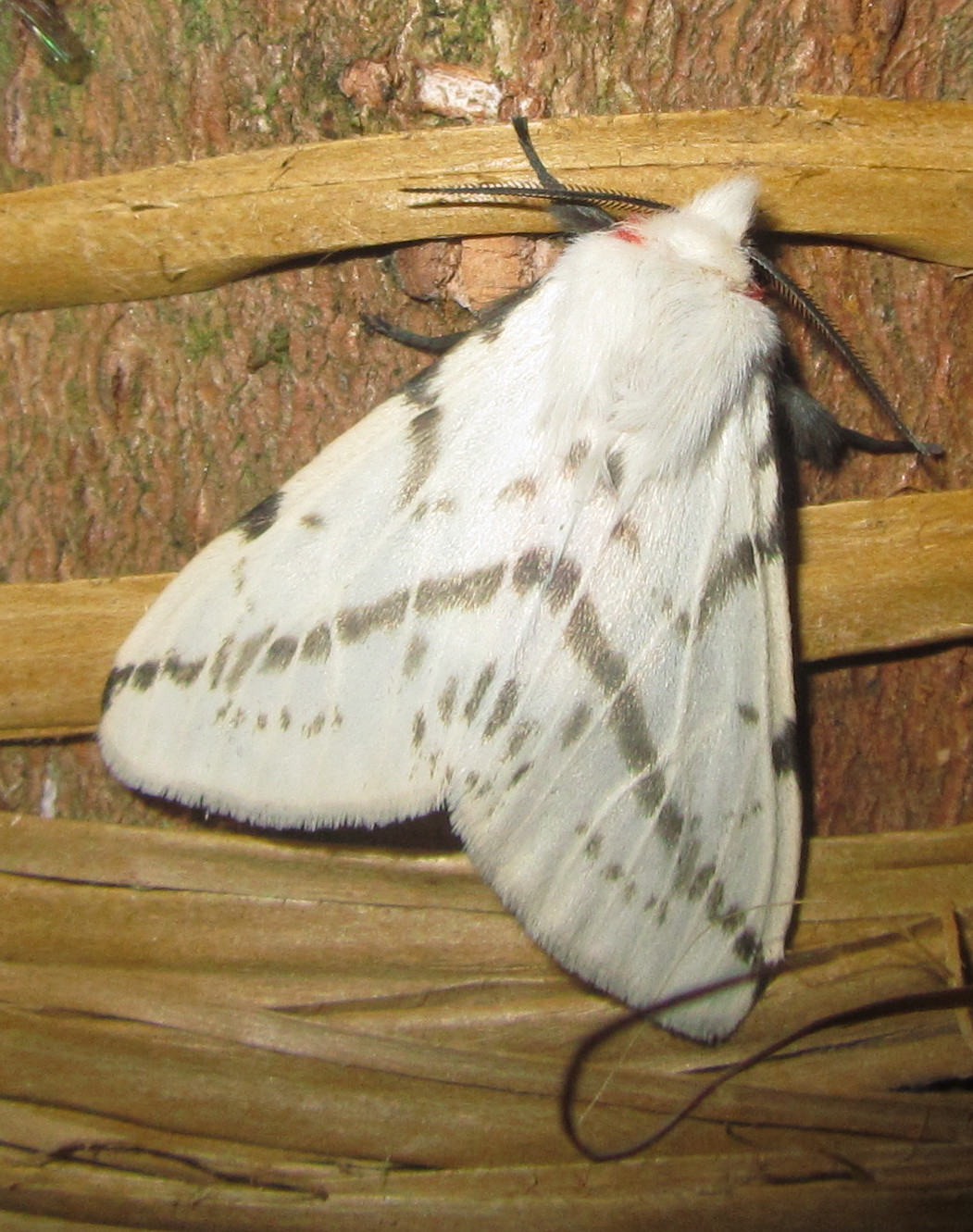

Scientific classification
- Kingdom: Animalia
- Phylum: Arthropoda
- Class: Insecta
- Order: Lepidoptera
- Superfamily: Noctuoidea
- Family: Erebidae
- Subfamily: Arctiinae
- Genus: Lemyra
- Species: L. multivittata

Binomial name
- Lemyra multivittata (Moore, 1865)

Synonyms
- Spilosoma multivittata Moore, [1866]; Diacrisia multivittata assama Rothschild, 1910

= Lemyra multivittata =

Species of moth

Lemyra multivittata is a moth of the family Erebidae. It was described by Frederic Moore in 1865. It is found in Nepal, India (Himachal-Pradesh, Sikkim, Assam), Myanmar and China (Yunnan, Tibet).
