= Lemyra sikkimensis =

Scientific classification
- Kingdom: Animalia
- Phylum: Arthropoda
- Class: Insecta
- Order: Lepidoptera
- Superfamily: Noctuoidea
- Family: Erebidae
- Subfamily: Arctiinae
- Genus: Lemyra
- Species: L. sikkimensis

Binomial name
- Lemyra sikkimensis (Moore, 1879)

Synonyms
- Euchaetes sikkimensis Moore, 1879; Diacrisia sikkimensis

Species of moth

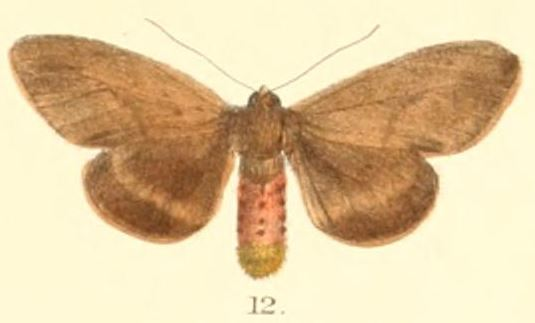
Illustration of Lemyra sikkimensis (Moore, 1879)

Lemyra sikkimensis is a moth of the family Erebidae. It was described by Frederic Moore in 1879. It is found in India (western Bengal, Assam, Khasi Hills) and China.
