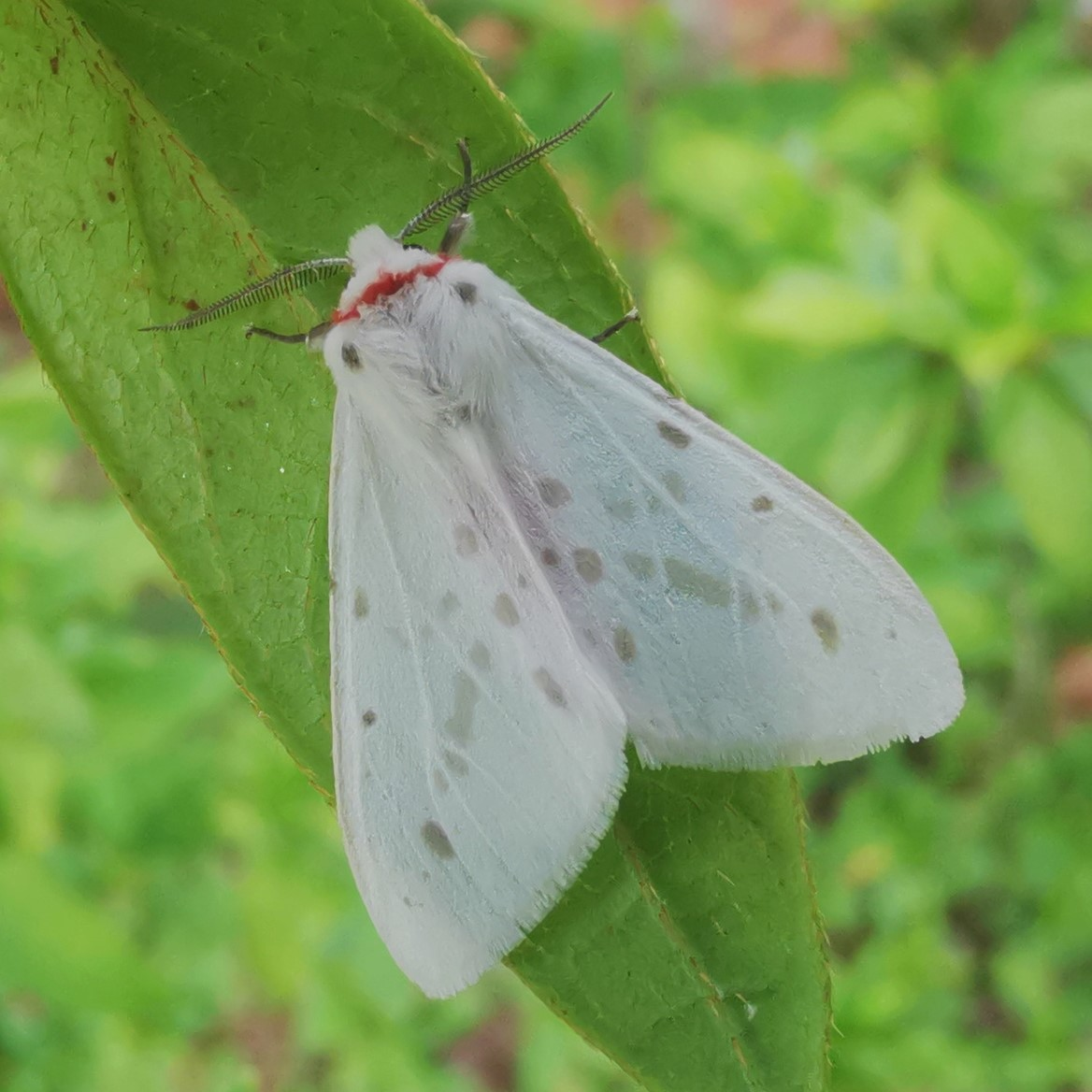

Scientific classification
- Domain: Eukaryota
- Kingdom: Animalia
- Phylum: Arthropoda
- Class: Insecta
- Order: Lepidoptera
- Superfamily: Noctuoidea
- Family: Erebidae
- Subfamily: Arctiinae
- Genus: Lemyra
- Species: L. melli

Binomial name
- Lemyra melli (Daniel, 1943)

Synonyms
- Spilarctia melli Daniel, 1943; Spilarctia shensii Daniel, 1943

= Lemyra melli =

Species of moth

Lemyra melli is a species of moth in the family Erebidae. It was first described by Franz Daniel in 1943 and is found in China (Yunnan, Shaanxi, Zhejiang, Tibet, Shanxi, Gansu, Sichuan, Heilongjiang, Jilin, Liaonin, Hebei).

== Subspecies ==
- Lemyra melli melli (China: Sichuan, Yunnan, Jiangxi, Hubei, Hunan, Guangxi, Sichuan, Yunnan, Tibet)
- Lemyra melli shensii (Daniel, 1943) (China: Shaanxi, Heilongjiang, Jilin, Liaonin, Shanxi, Hebei, Gansu)
