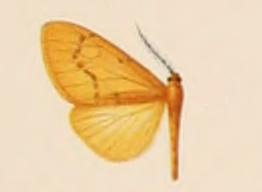

Scientific classification
- Domain: Eukaryota
- Kingdom: Animalia
- Phylum: Arthropoda
- Class: Insecta
- Order: Lepidoptera
- Superfamily: Noctuoidea
- Family: Erebidae
- Subfamily: Arctiinae
- Genus: Lemyra
- Species: L. everetti

Binomial name
- Lemyra everetti (Rothschild, 1910)

Synonyms
- Diacrisia everetti Rothschild, 1910; Spilosoma everetti

= Lemyra everetti =

Species of moth

Lemyra everetti is a moth of the family Erebidae first described by Walter Rothschild in 1910. It is found on Flores in Indonesia.
