= Lemyra zhangmuna =

Scientific classification
- Kingdom: Animalia
- Phylum: Arthropoda
- Clade: Pancrustacea
- Class: Insecta
- Order: Lepidoptera
- Superfamily: Noctuoidea
- Family: Erebidae
- Subfamily: Arctiinae
- Genus: Lemyra
- Species: L. zhangmuna

Binomial name
- Lemyra zhangmuna C.-L. Fang, 1982

Synonyms
- Spilarctia zhangmuna C.-L. Fang, 1982

Species of moth

Lemyra zhangmuna is a moth in the family Erebidae. The revised combination Lemyra zhangmuna (C.-L. Fang, 1982) was published by Dubatolov, 2010. It was originally described as Spilarctia zhangmuna by Cheng-Lai Fang in 1982. It is found in Yunnan and Tibet in western China.
