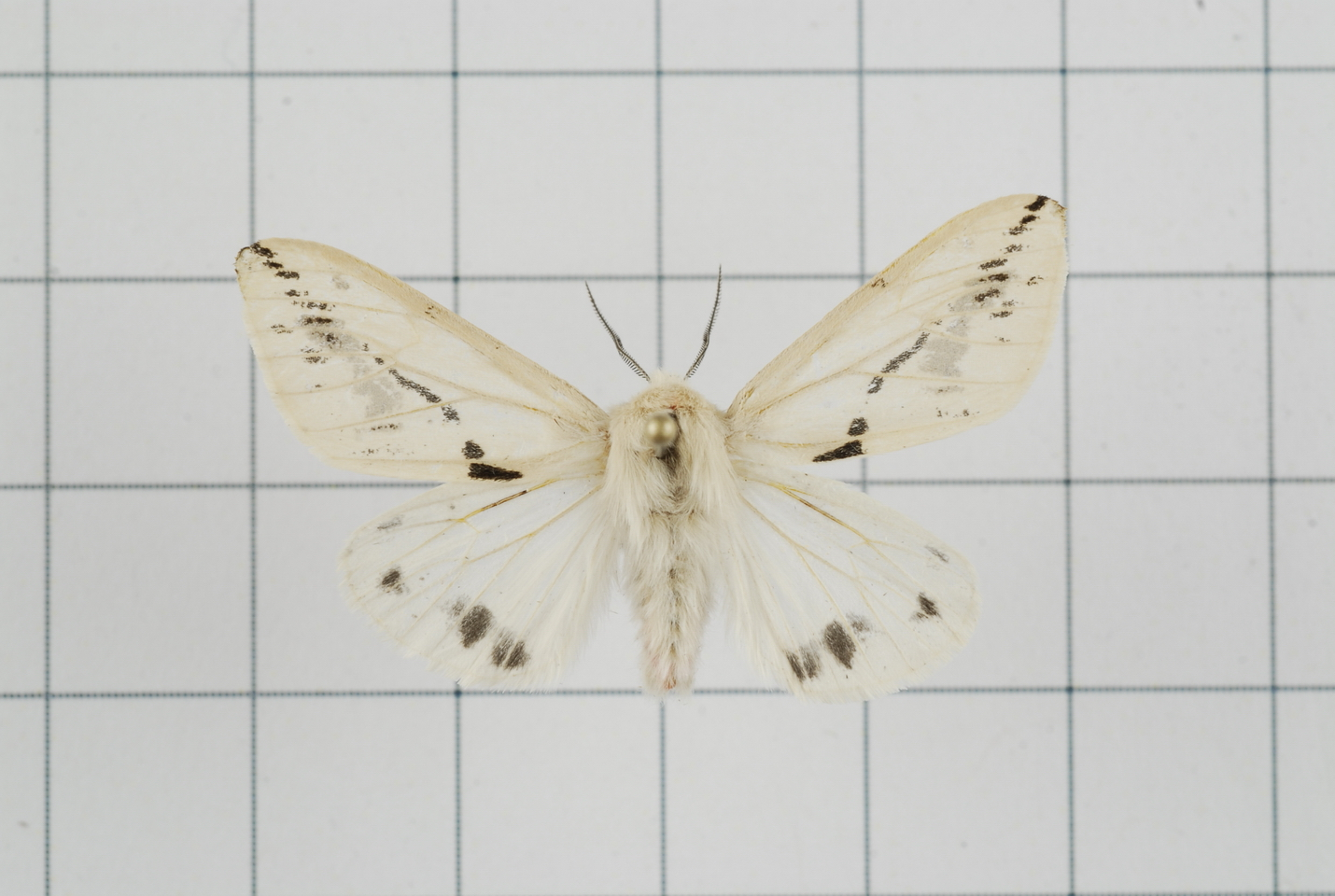

Scientific classification
- Kingdom: Animalia
- Phylum: Arthropoda
- Clade: Pancrustacea
- Class: Insecta
- Order: Lepidoptera
- Superfamily: Noctuoidea
- Family: Erebidae
- Subfamily: Arctiinae
- Genus: Lemyra
- Species: L. stigmata

Binomial name
- Lemyra stigmata (Moore, 1865)

Synonyms
- Spilosoma stigmata Moore, [1866]; Spilarctia lacteata Butler, 1881; Lemyra walkeri Kaleka, 2001; Diacrisia aurantiaca; Diacrisia aurantifemer Strand, 1919

= Lemyra stigmata =

Species of moth

Lemyra stigmata is a moth of the family Erebidae. It was described by Frederic Moore in 1865. It is found in China (Sichuan, Tibet, Yunnan, Shaanxi, Hubei), Pakistan, India (Himalayas, Sikkim, Assam, Arunachal Pradesh), Nepal, Bhutan, Myanmar, Thailand and Vietnam.

== Subspecies ==
- Lemyra stigmata stigmata (China: Sichuan, Tibet, Yunnan)
- Lemyra stigmata aurantiaca (Fang, 1985) (Vietnam, China: Yunnan)
