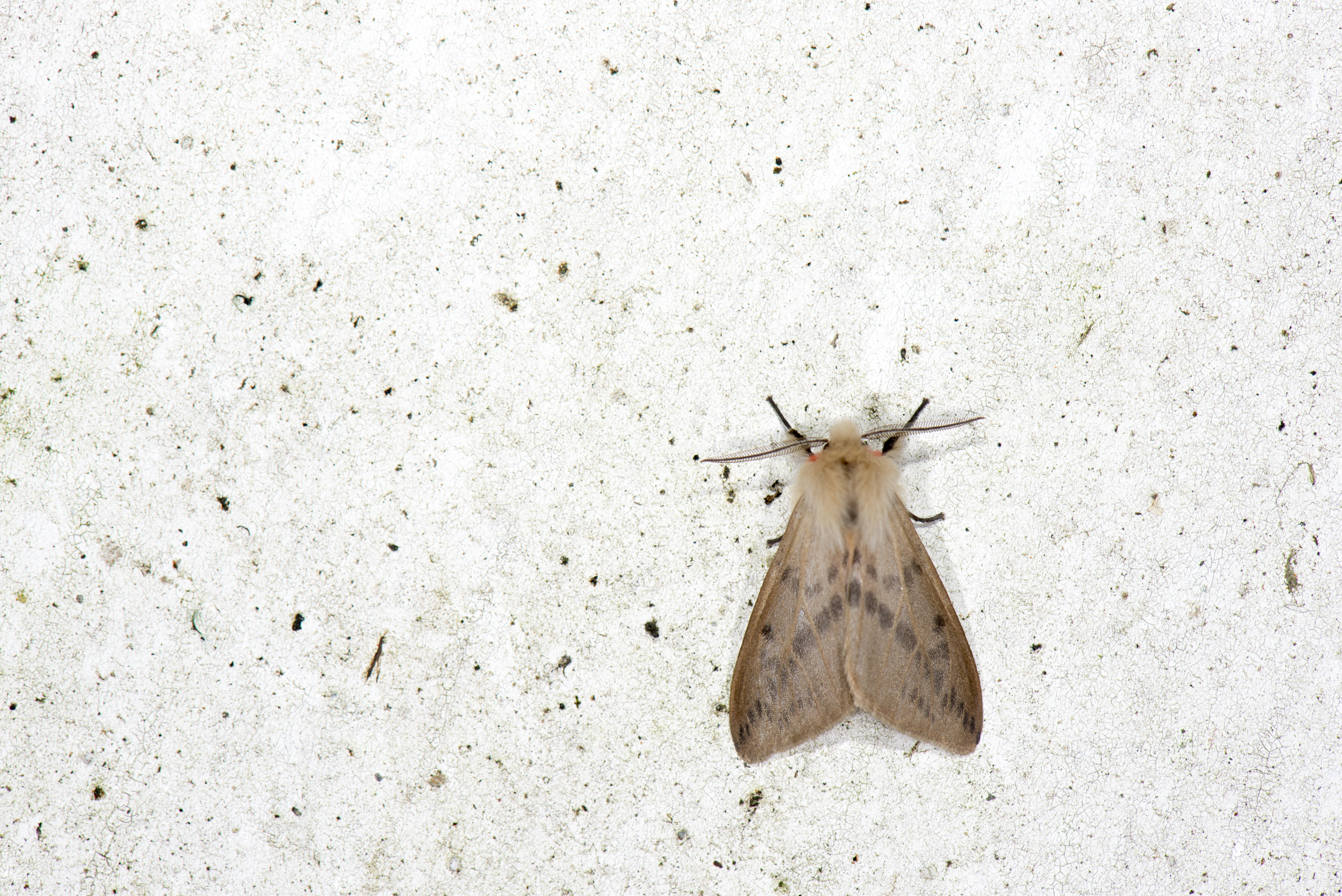

Scientific classification
- Kingdom: Animalia
- Phylum: Arthropoda
- Clade: Pancrustacea
- Class: Insecta
- Order: Lepidoptera
- Superfamily: Noctuoidea
- Family: Erebidae
- Subfamily: Arctiinae
- Genus: Lemyra
- Species: L. fallaciosa

Binomial name
- Lemyra fallaciosa (Matsumura, 1927)

Synonyms
- Diacrisia usuguronis Matsumura, 1930; Diacrisia rhodophila f. shiromis Matsumura, 1931

= Lemyra fallaciosa =

Species of moth

Lemyra fallaciosa is a moth of the family Erebidae. It was described by Shōnen Matsumura in 1927. It is found in Taiwan.
