= Lemyra burmanica =

Scientific classification
- Domain: Eukaryota
- Kingdom: Animalia
- Phylum: Arthropoda
- Class: Insecta
- Order: Lepidoptera
- Superfamily: Noctuoidea
- Family: Erebidae
- Subfamily: Arctiinae
- Genus: Lemyra
- Species: L. burmanica

Binomial name
- Lemyra burmanica (Rothschild, 1910)

Synonyms
- Diacrisia burmanica Rothschild, 1910

Species of moth

Lemyra burmanica is a moth of the family Erebidae. It was described by Walter Rothschild in 1910. It is found in China (Guangdong, Guangxi, Yunnan, Hunan, Sichuan, Tibet).
