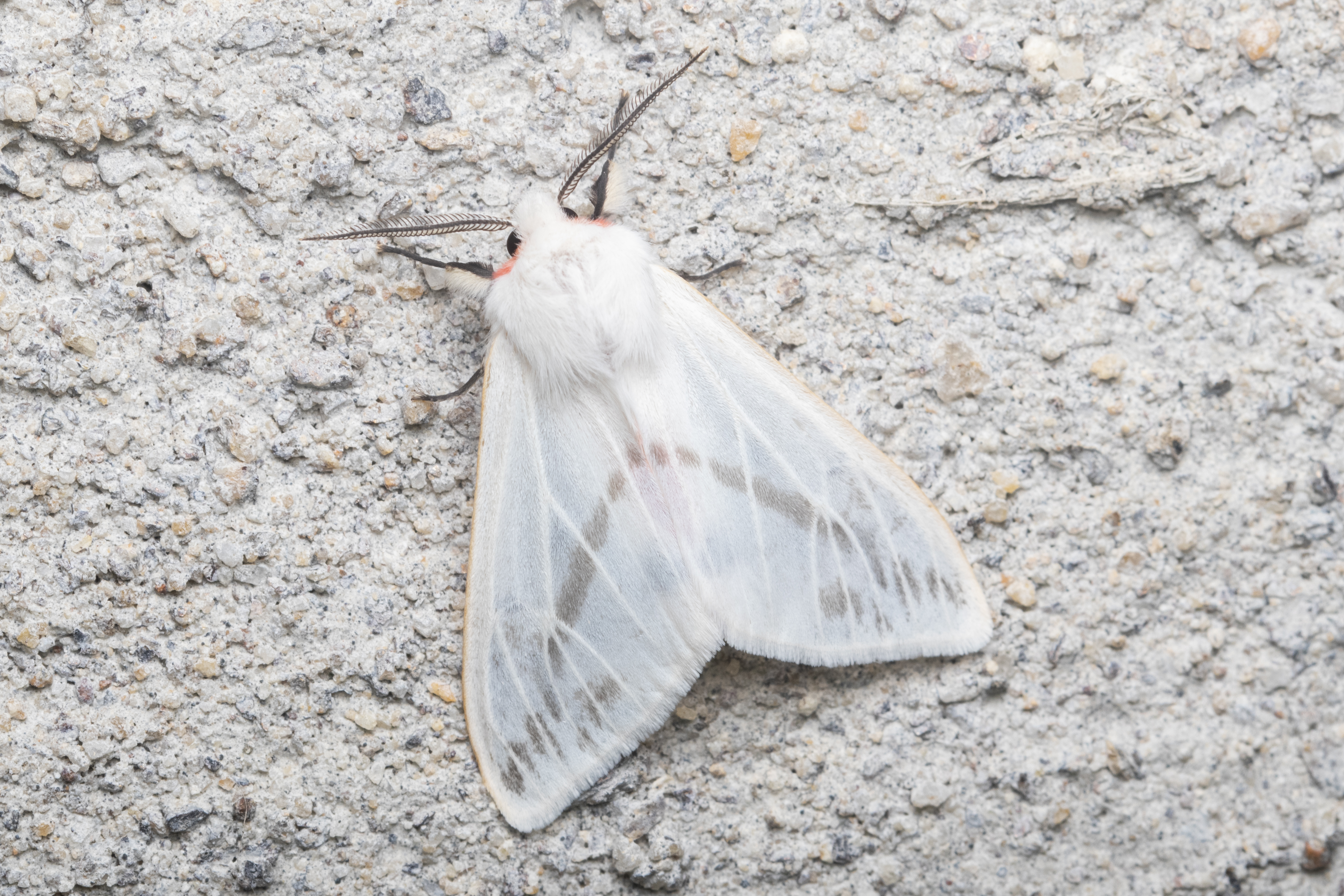

Scientific classification
- Kingdom: Animalia
- Phylum: Arthropoda
- Class: Insecta
- Order: Lepidoptera
- Superfamily: Noctuoidea
- Family: Erebidae
- Subfamily: Arctiinae
- Genus: Lemyra
- Species: L. rhodophila

Binomial name
- Lemyra rhodophila (Walker, 1864)

Synonyms
- Spilosoma rhodophila Walker, [1865]; Diacrisia rhodophila

= Lemyra rhodophila =

Species of moth

Lemyra rhodophila is a moth of the family Erebidae. It was described by Francis Walker in 1864. It is found in China (Tibet), Pakistan, India (Himachal Pradesh, Sikkim), Myanmar and Nepal.
