= Lemyra eximia =

Scientific classification
- Domain: Eukaryota
- Kingdom: Animalia
- Phylum: Arthropoda
- Class: Insecta
- Order: Lepidoptera
- Superfamily: Noctuoidea
- Family: Erebidae
- Subfamily: Arctiinae
- Genus: Lemyra
- Species: L. eximia

Binomial name
- Lemyra eximia (C. Swinhoe, 1891)

Synonyms
- Alpenus eximia C. Swinhoe, 1891; Diacrisia eximia

Species of moth

Lemyra eximia is a moth of the family Erebidae. It was described by Charles Swinhoe in 1891. It is found in southern India.
