= Lemyra alleni =

Scientific classification
- Domain: Eukaryota
- Kingdom: Animalia
- Phylum: Arthropoda
- Class: Insecta
- Order: Lepidoptera
- Superfamily: Noctuoidea
- Family: Erebidae
- Subfamily: Arctiinae
- Genus: Lemyra
- Species: L. alleni

Binomial name
- Lemyra alleni Thomas, 1990

Species of moth

Lemyra alleni is a moth of the family Erebidae. It was described by Thomas in 1990. It is found in Thailand.
