= Lemyra flammeola =

Scientific classification
- Domain: Eukaryota
- Kingdom: Animalia
- Phylum: Arthropoda
- Class: Insecta
- Order: Lepidoptera
- Superfamily: Noctuoidea
- Family: Erebidae
- Subfamily: Arctiinae
- Genus: Lemyra
- Species: L. flammeola

Binomial name
- Lemyra flammeola (Moore, 1877)

Synonyms
- Alpenus flammeolus Moore, 1877; Spilarctia hunana Daniel, 1943

Species of moth

Lemyra flammeola is a moth of the family Erebidae. It was described by Frederic Moore in 1877. It is found in China (Jiangxi, Zhejiang, Shandong, Fujian, Hunan, Sichuan, Yunnan).

== Subspecies ==
- Lemyra flammeola flammeola (Shandong, Zhejiang, Fujian, Yunnan)
- Lemyra flammeola hunana (Daniel, 1943) (Hunan)
