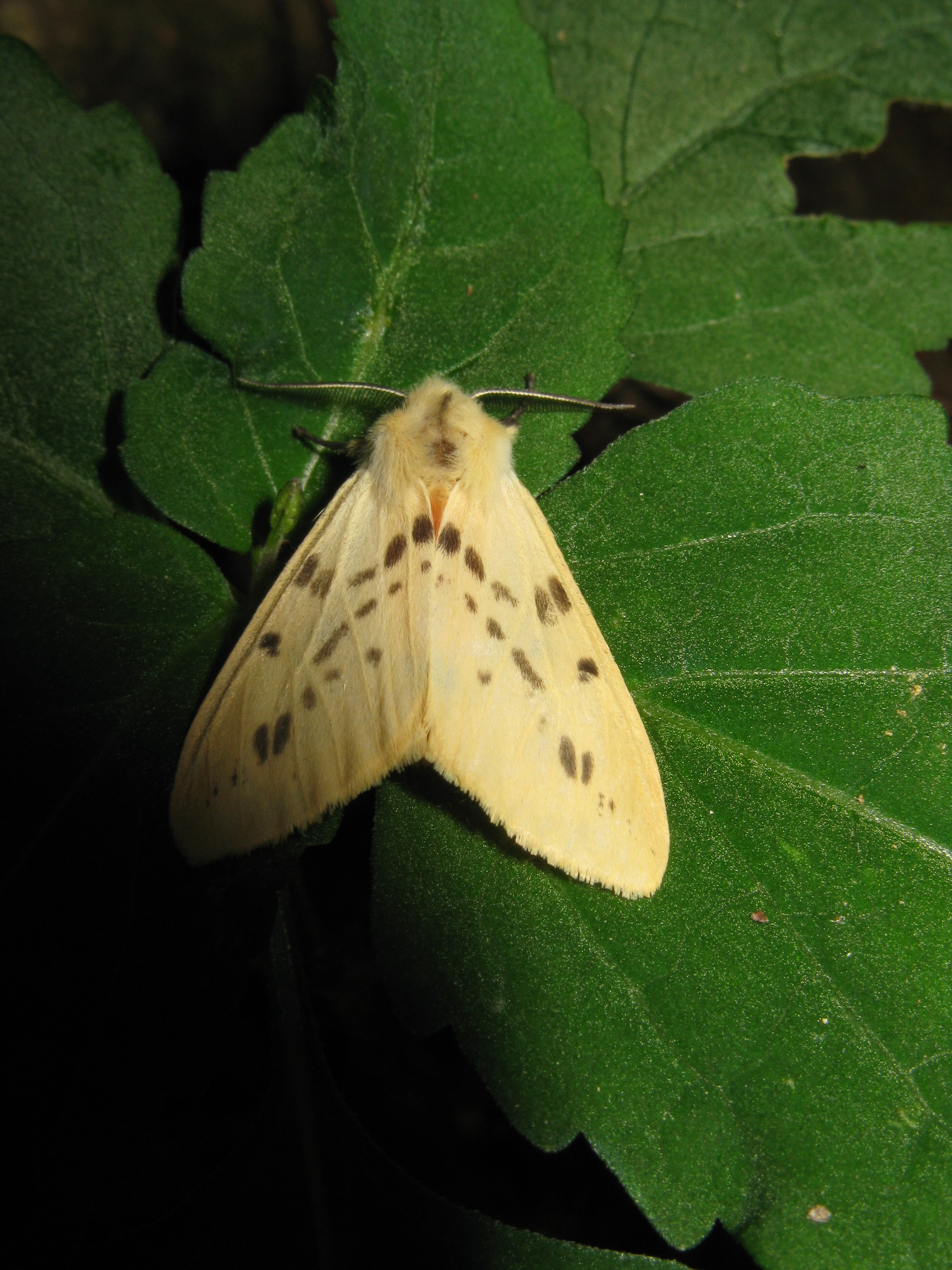
- Lemyra inaequalis

Scientific classification
- Kingdom: Animalia
- Phylum: Arthropoda
- Class: Insecta
- Order: Lepidoptera
- Superfamily: Noctuoidea
- Family: Erebidae
- Subfamily: Arctiinae
- Subtribe: Spilosomina
- Genus: Lemyra; Walker, 1856

Type species
- Lemyra extensa Walker, 1856

Synonyms
- Carbisa Moore, 1879; Thyrgorina Walker, [1865] 1864; Echlida Walker, 1865; Icambosida Walker, 1865; Thanatarctia Butler, 1877; Challa Moore, 1879; Xanthomaenas Roepke, 1940; Allochrista Roepke, 1946

= Lemyra =

Genus of moths

Lemyra is a genus of tiger moths in the family Erebidae. The genus contains many species from East and South Asia, Sundaland and Australia. It was described by Francis Walker in 1856.

== Species ==
=== Subgenus Lemyra ===
- Lemyra extensa Walker, 1856
- Lemyra maculifascia (Walker, 1855)
- Lemyra philippinica Thomas, 1990
- Lemyra punctatostrigata (Bethune-Baker, 1904)
- Lemyra quadrisaccus (Holloway, 1982)
- Lemyra venosa (Moore, 1879)

=== Subgenus Thyrgorina Walker, [1865] ===
- Lemyra alikangensis (Strand, 1915)
- Lemyra alleni Thomas, 1990
- Lemyra anormala (Daniel, 1943)
- Lemyra atrata Černý, 2014
- Lemyra barliga Thomas, 1990
- Lemyra basirosea Černý, 2014
- Lemyra bimaculata (Moore, 1879)
- Lemyra biseriata (Moore, 1877)
- Lemyra boghaika Tshistjakov & Kishida, 1994
- Lemyra bornemontana Holloway, 1988
- Lemyra burmanica (Rothschild, 1910)
- Lemyra copiosa Thomas, 1990
- Lemyra costalis (J.Singh & A.Singh, 1998)
- Lemyra costimacula (Leech, 1899)
- Lemyra crama Černý, 2009
- Lemyra cretata Černý, 2009
- Lemyra dejongi Thomas, 1990
- Lemyra dendrovia Černý, 2014
- Lemyra diluta Thomas, 1990
- Lemyra deumeri Černý, 2014
- Lemyra everetti (Rothschild, 1910)
- Lemyra excelsa Thomas, 1990
- Lemyra eximia (Swinhoe, 1891)
- Lemyra extensa Walker, 1856
- Lemyra fallaciosa (Matsumura, 1927)
- Lemyra flammeola (Moore, 1877)
- Lemyra flavalis (Moore, 1865)
- Lemyra flaveola (Leech, 1899)
- Lemyra floresina Černý, 2014
- Lemyra gloria Fang, 1993
- Lemyra hanoica (Daniel, 1953)
- Lemyra heringi (Daniel, 1943)
- Lemyra hyalina (Fang, 1990)
- Lemyra imparilis (Butler, 1877)
- Lemyra inaequalis (Butler, 1879)
- Lemyra infernalis (Butler, 1877)
- Lemyra jankowskii (Oberthür, 1881)
- Lemyra jeremyi Thomas, 1990
- Lemyra jiangxiensis (Fang, 1990)
- Lemyra kannegieteri (Rothschild, 1910)
- Lemyra khasiana Thomas, 1990
- Lemyra kobesi Thomas, 1990
- Lemyra kuangtungensis (Daniel, 1954)
- Lemyra lutheri Černý, 2014
- Lemyra malickyi Černý, 2009
- Lemyra melanochroa (Hampson, 1918)
- Lemyra melanosoma (Hampson, 1894)
- Lemyra melli (Daniel, 1943)
- Lemyra miniatrata Černý, 2014
- Lemyra minuta Černý, 2009
- Lemyra moltrechti (Miyake, 1909)
- Lemyra multivittata (Moore, 1865)
- Lemyra murzinorum Dubatolov, 2007
- Lemyra neglecta (Rothschild, 1910)
- Lemyra neurica (Hampson, 1911)
- Lemyra nigrescens (Rothschild, 1910)
- Lemyra nigricosta Thomas, 1990
- Lemyra nigrifrons (Walker, 1865)
- Lemyra nocturna Thomas, 1990
- Lemyra obliquivitta (Moore, 1879)
- Lemyra pectorale Černý, 2009
- Lemyra phasma (Leech, 1899)
- Lemyra pilosa (Rothschild, 1910)
- Lemyra pilosoides (Daniel, 1943)
- Lemyra praetexta Černý, 2011
- Lemyra proteus (de Joannis, 1928)
- Lemyra pseudoflammeoida (Fang, 1983)
- Lemyra punctilinea (Moore, 1879)
- Lemyra ramosula Černý, 2014
- Lemyra rhodophila (Walker, 1864)
- Lemyra rhodophiloides (Hampson, 1909)
- Lemyra rubidorsa (Moore, 1865)
- Lemyra rubrocollaris Reich, 1937
- Lemyra sikkimensis (Moore, 1879)
- Lemyra sincera Fang, 1993
- Lemyra singularis (Roepke, 1940)
- Lemyra sordidescens (Hampson, 1901)
- Lemyra spilosomata (Walker, [1865] 1864)
- Lemyra stigmata (Moore, 1865)
- Lemyra subfascia (Walker, 1855)
- Lemyra toxopei (Roepke, 1946)
- Lemyra wernerthomasi Inoue, 1992 [1993]
- Lemyra ypsilon (Rothschild, 1910)
- Lemyra zhangmuna (Fang, 1982)
