= Lemyra nigrescens =

Scientific classification
- Domain: Eukaryota
- Kingdom: Animalia
- Phylum: Arthropoda
- Class: Insecta
- Order: Lepidoptera
- Superfamily: Noctuoidea
- Family: Erebidae
- Subfamily: Arctiinae
- Genus: Lemyra
- Species: L. nigrescens

Binomial name
- Lemyra nigrescens (Rothschild, 1910)

Synonyms
- Diacrisia eximia nigrescens Rothschild, 1910

Species of moth

Lemyra nigrescens is a moth of the family Erebidae. It was described by Walter Rothschild in 1910. It is found in India (Sikkim, Assam, Darjiling), Bhutan and possibly China (Shanghai, Hunan, Zhejiang).
