= Lemyra nigrifrons =

Scientific classification
- Kingdom: Animalia
- Phylum: Arthropoda
- Class: Insecta
- Order: Lepidoptera
- Superfamily: Noctuoidea
- Family: Erebidae
- Subfamily: Arctiinae
- Genus: Lemyra
- Species: L. nigrifrons

Binomial name
- Lemyra nigrifrons (Walker, 1865)

Synonyms
- Icambosida nigrifrons Walker, 1865; Diacrisia nigrifrons

Species of moth

Lemyra nigrifrons is a moth of the family Erebidae. It was described by Francis Walker in 1865. It is found in India (Sikkim, Assam), Myanmar and Thailand.
