= Lemyra boghaika =

Scientific classification
- Domain: Eukaryota
- Kingdom: Animalia
- Phylum: Arthropoda
- Class: Insecta
- Order: Lepidoptera
- Superfamily: Noctuoidea
- Family: Erebidae
- Subfamily: Arctiinae
- Genus: Lemyra
- Species: L. boghaika

Binomial name
- Lemyra boghaika Tshistjakov & Kishida, 1994

Synonyms
- Lemyra boghaica

Species of moth

Lemyra boghaika is a moth of the family Erebidae. It was described by Yuri A. Tshistjakov and Yasunori Kishida in 1994. It is found in the Russian Far East (Khabarovsk and Primorye Provinces) and Korea. It is probably also present in China (where it is expected to occur in Heilongjiang, Jilin and Liaonin).

The length of the forewings is 15–17 mm for males and 20–22 mm for females.
