= Lemyra heringi =

Scientific classification
- Domain: Eukaryota
- Kingdom: Animalia
- Phylum: Arthropoda
- Class: Insecta
- Order: Lepidoptera
- Superfamily: Noctuoidea
- Family: Erebidae
- Subfamily: Arctiinae
- Genus: Lemyra
- Species: L. heringi

Binomial name
- Lemyra heringi (Daniel, 1943)

Synonyms
- Spilarctia heringi Daniel, 1943

Species of moth

Lemyra heringi is a moth of the family Erebidae. It was described by Franz Daniel in 1943. It is found in Yunnan, China.
