= Lemyra melanochroa =

Scientific classification
- Kingdom: Animalia
- Phylum: Arthropoda
- Class: Insecta
- Order: Lepidoptera
- Superfamily: Noctuoidea
- Family: Erebidae
- Subfamily: Arctiinae
- Genus: Lemyra
- Species: L. melanochroa

Binomial name
- Lemyra melanochroa (Hampson, 1918)

Synonyms
- Spilosoma melanochroa Hampson, 1918

Species of moth

Lemyra melanochroa is a moth of the family Erebidae. It was described by George Hampson in 1918. It is found in southern India (Tamil Nadu: Nilgiris).
