= Lemyra barliga =

Scientific classification
- Kingdom: Animalia
- Phylum: Arthropoda
- Clade: Pancrustacea
- Class: Insecta
- Order: Lepidoptera
- Superfamily: Noctuoidea
- Family: Erebidae
- Subfamily: Arctiinae
- Genus: Lemyra
- Species: L. barliga

Binomial name
- Lemyra barliga Thomas, 1990

Species of moth

Lemyra barliga is a moth in the family Erebidae. It was described by Thomas in 1990. It is found on Luzon in the Philippines. The habitat consists of primary mountain forests at altitudes ranging from 1,550 to 1,900 meters.

The length of the forewings is 16–20 mm for males and about 27 mm for females.
