= Secusio drucei =

Scientific classification
- Domain: Eukaryota
- Kingdom: Animalia
- Phylum: Arthropoda
- Class: Insecta
- Order: Lepidoptera
- Superfamily: Noctuoidea
- Family: Erebidae
- Subfamily: Arctiinae
- Genus: Secusio
- Species: S. drucei

Binomial name
- Secusio drucei Rothschild, 1933

Species of moth

Secusio drucei is a moth in the subfamily Arctiinae. It was described by Walter Rothschild in 1933. It is found in Angola, Kenya and Uganda.

== Subspecies ==
- Secusio drucei drucei
- Secusio drucei intensa Rothschild, 1933 (Uganda)
