= Secusio deilemera =

Scientific classification
- Kingdom: Animalia
- Phylum: Arthropoda
- Class: Insecta
- Order: Lepidoptera
- Superfamily: Noctuoidea
- Family: Erebidae
- Subfamily: Arctiinae
- Genus: Secusio
- Species: S. deilemera

Binomial name
- Secusio deilemera Strand, 1909

Species of moth

Secusio deilemera is a moth in the subfamily Arctiinae. It was described by Strand in 1909. It is found in Angola, the Democratic Republic of Congo, South Africa and Uganda.
