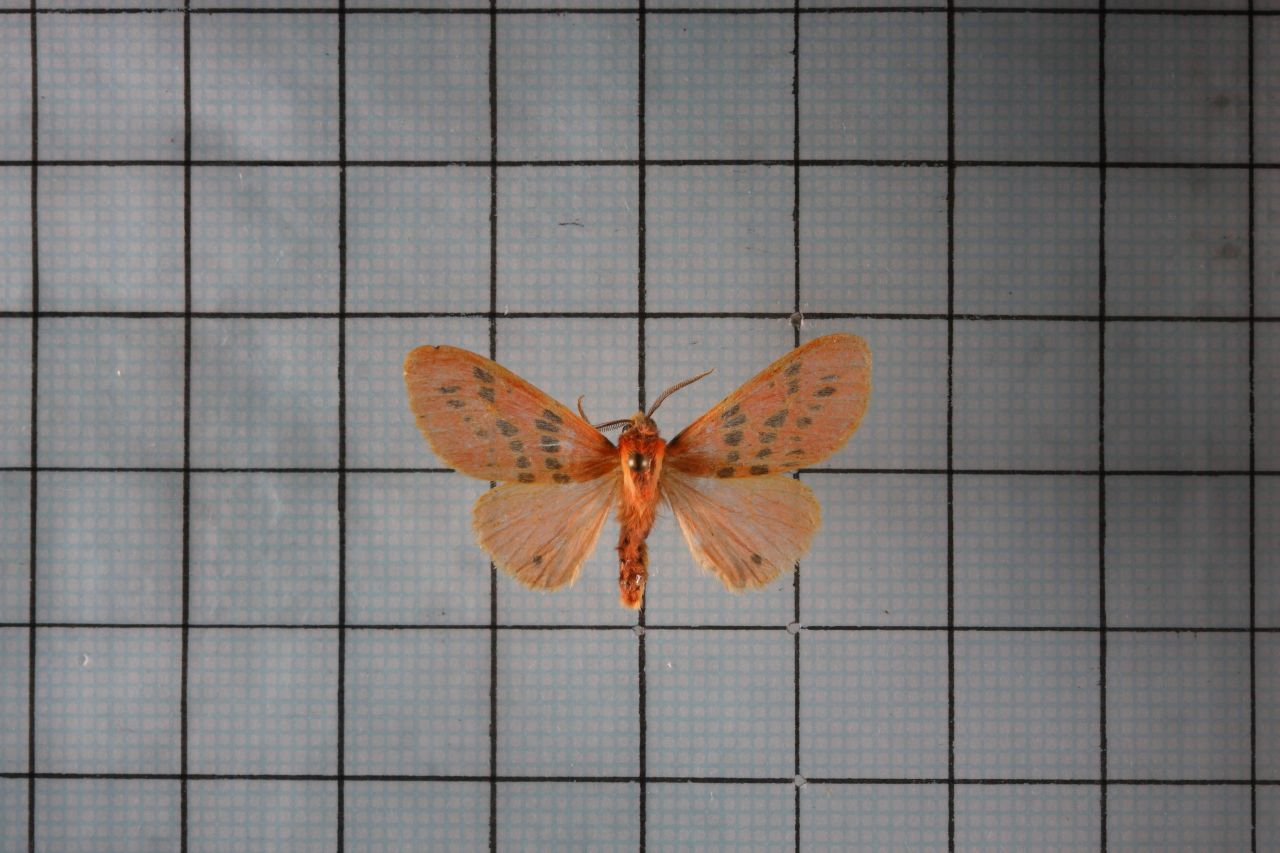

Scientific classification
- Domain: Eukaryota
- Kingdom: Animalia
- Phylum: Arthropoda
- Class: Insecta
- Order: Lepidoptera
- Superfamily: Noctuoidea
- Family: Erebidae
- Subfamily: Arctiinae
- Genus: Lemyra
- Species: L. alikangensis

Binomial name
- Lemyra alikangensis (Strand, 1915)

Synonyms
- Diacrisia alikangensis Strand, 1915; Diacrisia punctilinea Wileman, 1910; Diacrisia punctilineola Strand, 1919

= Lemyra alikangensis =

Species of moth

Lemyra alikangensis is a moth in the family Erebidae first described by Embrik Strand in 1915. It is found in Taiwan.
