= Lemyra biseriata =

Scientific classification
- Domain: Eukaryota
- Kingdom: Animalia
- Phylum: Arthropoda
- Class: Insecta
- Order: Lepidoptera
- Superfamily: Noctuoidea
- Family: Erebidae
- Subfamily: Arctiinae
- Genus: Lemyra
- Species: L. biseriata

Binomial name
- Lemyra biseriata (Moore, 1877)

Synonyms
- Alpenus biseriatus Moore, 1877; Diacrisia biseriata; Alpenus flavens Moore, 1879; Diacrisia flavens; Lemyra biseriatus (Moore, 1877)

Species of moth

Lemyra biseriata is a moth of the family Erebidae. It was described by Frederic Moore in 1877. It is found in India (Assam, Khasi Hills) and Nepal.
