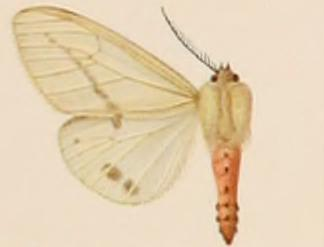

Scientific classification
- Domain: Eukaryota
- Kingdom: Animalia
- Phylum: Arthropoda
- Class: Insecta
- Order: Lepidoptera
- Superfamily: Noctuoidea
- Family: Erebidae
- Subfamily: Arctiinae
- Genus: Lemyra
- Species: L. punctilinea

Binomial name
- Lemyra punctilinea (Moore, 1879)

Synonyms
- Icambosida punctilinea Moore, 1879; Diacrisia unilinea Rothschild, 1910

= Lemyra punctilinea =

Species of moth

Lemyra punctilinea is a moth of the family Erebidae first described by Frederic Moore in 1879. It is found in Sichuan, Shaanxi, Yunnan, Pakistan, Kashmir, the Himalayas, Assam and Nepal.
