= Lemyra proteus =

Scientific classification
- Kingdom: Animalia
- Phylum: Arthropoda
- Class: Insecta
- Order: Lepidoptera
- Superfamily: Noctuoidea
- Family: Erebidae
- Subfamily: Arctiinae
- Genus: Lemyra
- Species: L. proteus

Binomial name
- Lemyra proteus (de Joannis, 1928)

Synonyms
- Maenas proteus de Joannis, 1928; Paralacydes proteus

Species of moth

Lemyra proteus is a moth of the family Erebidae. It was described by Joseph de Joannis in 1928. It is found in China (Guangdong, Guangxi, Hainan) and Vietnam.
