= Lemyra crama =

Scientific classification
- Domain: Eukaryota
- Kingdom: Animalia
- Phylum: Arthropoda
- Class: Insecta
- Order: Lepidoptera
- Superfamily: Noctuoidea
- Family: Erebidae
- Subfamily: Arctiinae
- Genus: Lemyra
- Species: L. crama

Binomial name
- Lemyra crama Černý, 2009

Species of moth

Lemyra crama is a moth of the family Erebidae. It was described by Karel Černý in 2009.
