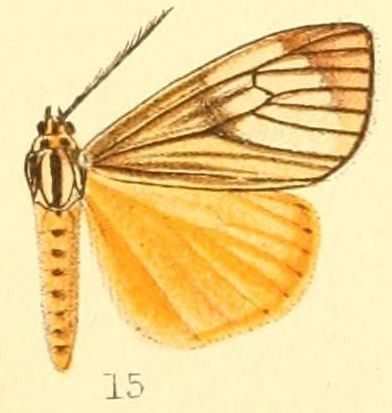

Scientific classification
- Kingdom: Animalia
- Phylum: Arthropoda
- Clade: Pancrustacea
- Class: Insecta
- Order: Lepidoptera
- Superfamily: Noctuoidea
- Family: Erebidae
- Subfamily: Arctiinae
- Genus: Secusio
- Species: S. mania

Binomial name
- Secusio mania H. Druce, 1887

= Secusio mania =

Species of moth

Secusio mania is a moth of the subfamily Arctiinae first described by Herbert Druce in 1887. It is found in Malawi, Mozambique and Uganda.
