= Secusio ansorgei =

Scientific classification
- Domain: Eukaryota
- Kingdom: Animalia
- Phylum: Arthropoda
- Class: Insecta
- Order: Lepidoptera
- Superfamily: Noctuoidea
- Family: Erebidae
- Subfamily: Arctiinae
- Genus: Secusio
- Species: S. ansorgei

Binomial name
- Secusio ansorgei Rothschild, 1933

Species of moth

Secusio ansorgei is a moth in the subfamily Arctiinae. It was described by Rothschild in 1933. It is found in Angola.
