= Lemyra flavalis =

Scientific classification
- Domain: Eukaryota
- Kingdom: Animalia
- Phylum: Arthropoda
- Class: Insecta
- Order: Lepidoptera
- Superfamily: Noctuoidea
- Family: Erebidae
- Subfamily: Arctiinae
- Genus: Lemyra
- Species: L. flavalis

Binomial name
- Lemyra flavalis (Moore, 1865)

Synonyms
- Spilosoma flavalis Moore, [1866]; Spilosoma rubitincta Moore, [1866]; Spilosoma lativitta Moore, [1866]; Spilosoma lativitta f. carnea Leech, 1899

Species of moth

Lemyra flavalis is a moth of the family Erebidae. It was described by Frederic Moore in 1865. It is found in China (Tibet, Yunnan, Sichuan), Nepal, India (Sikkim, Assam), Bhutan and Myanmar.

== Subspecies ==
- Lemyra flavalis flavalis (China: Tibet, Yunnan)
- Lemyra flavalis carnea (Leech, 1899) (China: Sichuan)
