= Lemyra rubidorsa =

Scientific classification
- Domain: Eukaryota
- Kingdom: Animalia
- Phylum: Arthropoda
- Class: Insecta
- Order: Lepidoptera
- Superfamily: Noctuoidea
- Family: Erebidae
- Subfamily: Arctiinae
- Genus: Lemyra
- Species: L. rubidorsa

Binomial name
- Lemyra rubidorsa (Moore, 1865)

Synonyms
- Spilosoma rubidorsa Moore, [1866]; Icambosida dorsalis Moore, 1888

Species of moth

Lemyra rubidorsa is a moth of the family Erebidae. It was described by Frederic Moore in 1865. It is found in Pakistan (Kashmir), India (Himachal-Pradesh, Sikkim, Assam) and China (Yunan, Tibet).
