= Lemyra subfascia =

Scientific classification
- Kingdom: Animalia
- Phylum: Arthropoda
- Class: Insecta
- Order: Lepidoptera
- Superfamily: Noctuoidea
- Family: Erebidae
- Subfamily: Arctiinae
- Genus: Lemyra
- Species: L. subfascia

Binomial name
- Lemyra subfascia (Walker, 1855)

Synonyms
- Spilosoma subfascia Walker, 1855

Species of moth

Lemyra subfascia is a moth of the family Erebidae. It was described by Francis Walker in 1855. It is found in Sri Lanka.

== Description ==
Abdomen is yellow in both sexes. In the male, the head and thorax are pale buff with black palpi. Tegulae each with a black spot. Abdomen orange with a dorsal and lateral series of black spots present. Legs black with pair hairs. Forewings with pale buff colour and a black spot at base, three spots on costa, one spot in cell and a speck at its upper angle. There is an oblique series of spots from apex to middle of inner margin. Two spots on the outer margin below the apex present. Hindwings are much paler and inner area is clothed with orange at apex. Some conjoined black spots towards anal angle and some at apex.

In the female, the oblique band of spots of the forewing are almost absent and also those on the outer margin below the apex. Hindwings without orange hairs on inner area. All spots obsolete except two spots near anal angle. Abdomen with a large ochreous anal tuft.
