= Lemyra melanosoma =

Scientific classification
- Kingdom: Animalia
- Phylum: Arthropoda
- Class: Insecta
- Order: Lepidoptera
- Superfamily: Noctuoidea
- Family: Erebidae
- Subfamily: Arctiinae
- Genus: Lemyra
- Species: L. melanosoma

Binomial name
- Lemyra melanosoma (Hampson, 1894)

Synonyms
- Thyrgorina melanosoma Hampson, 1894

Species of moth

Lemyra melanosoma is a moth of the family Erebidae. It was described by George Hampson in 1894. The species is found in China (including Sichuan, Yunnan, Shaanxi, Tibet, Hubei, Hunan), Pakistan, eastern India (in regions such as Kulu, Sikkim, Darjiling and the Khasi Hills) as well as in Myanmar and Thailand.

== Bibliography ==
- Pitkin, Brian & Jenkins, Paul. "Search results Family: Arctiidae". Butterflies and Moths of the World. Natural History Museum, London.
