= Lemyra infernalis =

Scientific classification
- Domain: Eukaryota
- Kingdom: Animalia
- Phylum: Arthropoda
- Class: Insecta
- Order: Lepidoptera
- Superfamily: Noctuoidea
- Family: Erebidae
- Subfamily: Arctiinae
- Genus: Lemyra
- Species: L. infernalis

Binomial name
- Lemyra infernalis (Butler, 1877)

Synonyms
- Thanatarctia infernalis Butler, 1877; Spilarctia mollicula Butler, 1877; Spilarctia rhodophila distincta Reich, 1937

Species of moth

Lemyra infernalis is a moth of the family Erebidae. It was described by Arthur Gardiner Butler in 1877. It is found in China (Zhejiang, Shaanxi, Liaonin, Jiangxi, Beijing, Hubei, Hunan), Taiwan, Japan and possibly Assam, India.
