= Lemyra neurica =

Scientific classification
- Kingdom: Animalia
- Phylum: Arthropoda
- Class: Insecta
- Order: Lepidoptera
- Superfamily: Noctuoidea
- Family: Erebidae
- Subfamily: Arctiinae
- Genus: Lemyra
- Species: L. neurica

Binomial name
- Lemyra neurica (Hampson, 1911)

Synonyms
- Diacrisia neurica Hampson, 1911; Spilosoma neurica

Species of moth

Lemyra neurica is a moth of the family Erebidae. It was described by George Hampson in 1911. It is found in India (Sikkim, Assam, Darjiling) and Bhutan.
