= Lemyra phasma =

Scientific classification
- Domain: Eukaryota
- Kingdom: Animalia
- Phylum: Arthropoda
- Class: Insecta
- Order: Lepidoptera
- Superfamily: Noctuoidea
- Family: Erebidae
- Subfamily: Arctiinae
- Genus: Lemyra
- Species: L. phasma

Binomial name
- Lemyra phasma (Leech, 1899)

Synonyms
- Thyrgorina phasma Leech, 1899; Alphaea phasma hoenei Daniel, 1943

Species of moth

Lemyra phasma is a moth of the family Erebidae. It was described by John Henry Leech in 1899. It is found in China (Sichuan, Yunnan, Hunan, Hubei, Guizhou, Tibet) and possibly northern Vietnam.
