= Secusio strigata =

Scientific classification
- Kingdom: Animalia
- Phylum: Arthropoda
- Class: Insecta
- Order: Lepidoptera
- Superfamily: Noctuoidea
- Family: Erebidae
- Subfamily: Arctiinae
- Genus: Secusio
- Species: S. strigata

Binomial name
- Secusio strigata Walker, 1854

Synonyms
- Secusio parvipuncta Hampson, 1891; Nyctemera hymenaea Gerstaecker, 1871

Species of moth

Secusio strigata is a moth in the subfamily Arctiinae. It was described by Francis Walker in 1854. It is found in Ethiopia, Kenya, Malawi, Somalia, South Africa, Tanzania, Uganda, Yemen, Zambia and India.

== Subspecies ==
- Secusio strigata strigata (Kenya, Malawi, South Africa, Uganda)
- Secusio strigata parvipuncta Hampson, 1891 (Kenya, Tanzania, Yemen, India)
- Secusio strigata yemenensis Wiltshire, 1983 (Yemen)
