= Lemyra praetexta =

Scientific classification
- Domain: Eukaryota
- Kingdom: Animalia
- Phylum: Arthropoda
- Class: Insecta
- Order: Lepidoptera
- Superfamily: Noctuoidea
- Family: Erebidae
- Subfamily: Arctiinae
- Genus: Lemyra
- Species: L. praetexta

Binomial name
- Lemyra praetexta Černý, 2011

Species of moth

Lemyra praetexta is a moth of the family Erebidae. It was described by Karel Černý in 2011. It is found on the Philippines, where it has been recorded only from the mountains of Palawan.
