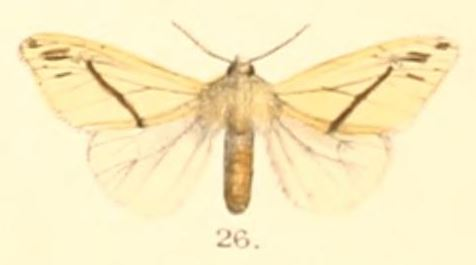

Scientific classification
- Kingdom: Animalia
- Phylum: Arthropoda
- Class: Insecta
- Order: Lepidoptera
- Superfamily: Noctuoidea
- Family: Erebidae
- Subfamily: Arctiinae
- Genus: Lemyra
- Species: L. obliquivitta

Binomial name
- Lemyra obliquivitta (Moore, 1879)

Synonyms
- Spilarctia obliquivitta Moore, 1879; Diacrisia obliquivitta; Spilarctia jucunda Butler, 1881

= Lemyra obliquivitta =

Species of moth

Lemyra obliquivitta is a moth of the family Erebidae. It was described by Frederic Moore in 1879. It is found in China (Zhejiang, Hunan, Sichuan, Yunnan, Tibet), Nepal, Bhutan, India (Sikkim, Manipur, Assam), Myanmar and Thailand.
