= Lemyra bimaculata =

Scientific classification
- Domain: Eukaryota
- Kingdom: Animalia
- Phylum: Arthropoda
- Class: Insecta
- Order: Lepidoptera
- Superfamily: Noctuoidea
- Family: Erebidae
- Subfamily: Arctiinae
- Genus: Lemyra
- Species: L. bimaculata

Binomial name
- Lemyra bimaculata (Moore, 1879)

Synonyms
- Challa bimaculata Moore, 1879; Challa discalis Moore, 1879; Challa quadrimaculata Moore, 1888; Thanatarctia crispens Kaleka, 2000; Lemyra crispens; Thanatarctia kodai Kaleka, 2000; Lemyra kodai; Thanatarctia saccuens Kaleka, 2000; Lemyra saccuens

Species of moth

Lemyra bimaculata is a moth of the family Erebidae. It was described by Frederic Moore in 1879. It is found in eastern India (in the Himalayas from Garhwal to Darjeeling) and Nepal.
