= Lemyra maculifascia =

Scientific classification
- Kingdom: Animalia
- Phylum: Arthropoda
- Class: Insecta
- Order: Lepidoptera
- Superfamily: Noctuoidea
- Family: Erebidae
- Subfamily: Arctiinae
- Genus: Lemyra
- Species: L. maculifascia

Binomial name
- Lemyra maculifascia (Walker, 1855)

Synonyms
- Spilosoma maculifascia Walker, 1855; Maenas maculifascia; Paralacydes maculifascia; Spilosoma conspurcatum Walker, 1856; Lymantria parva Walker, 1865; Liparis parva; Maenas parvula Hulstaert, 1924; Maenas malayensis Hampson, 1901; Maenas maculifascia roseata Rothschild, 1910; Maenas arescopa Turner, 1906

Species of moth

Lemyra maculifascia is a moth of the family Erebidae. It was described by Francis Walker in 1855. It is found in China (Shandong, Yunnan), Indonesia (Sumatra, Nias, Java, Bali, Borneo, Sulawesi, the Moluccas, Ambon Island, Buru, Lombok, Dammer, Aru), Timor, the Philippines, New Guinea and Australia (Western Australia and Queensland). It is found in secondary habitats, including bush, clearings in primary forests and plantations, from the sea level up to elevations of about 1,200 meters.

The wingspan is about 30 mm.

The larvae have been reported feeding on the foliage of Dioscorea oppositifolia, Convolvulus and Erythrina species.
