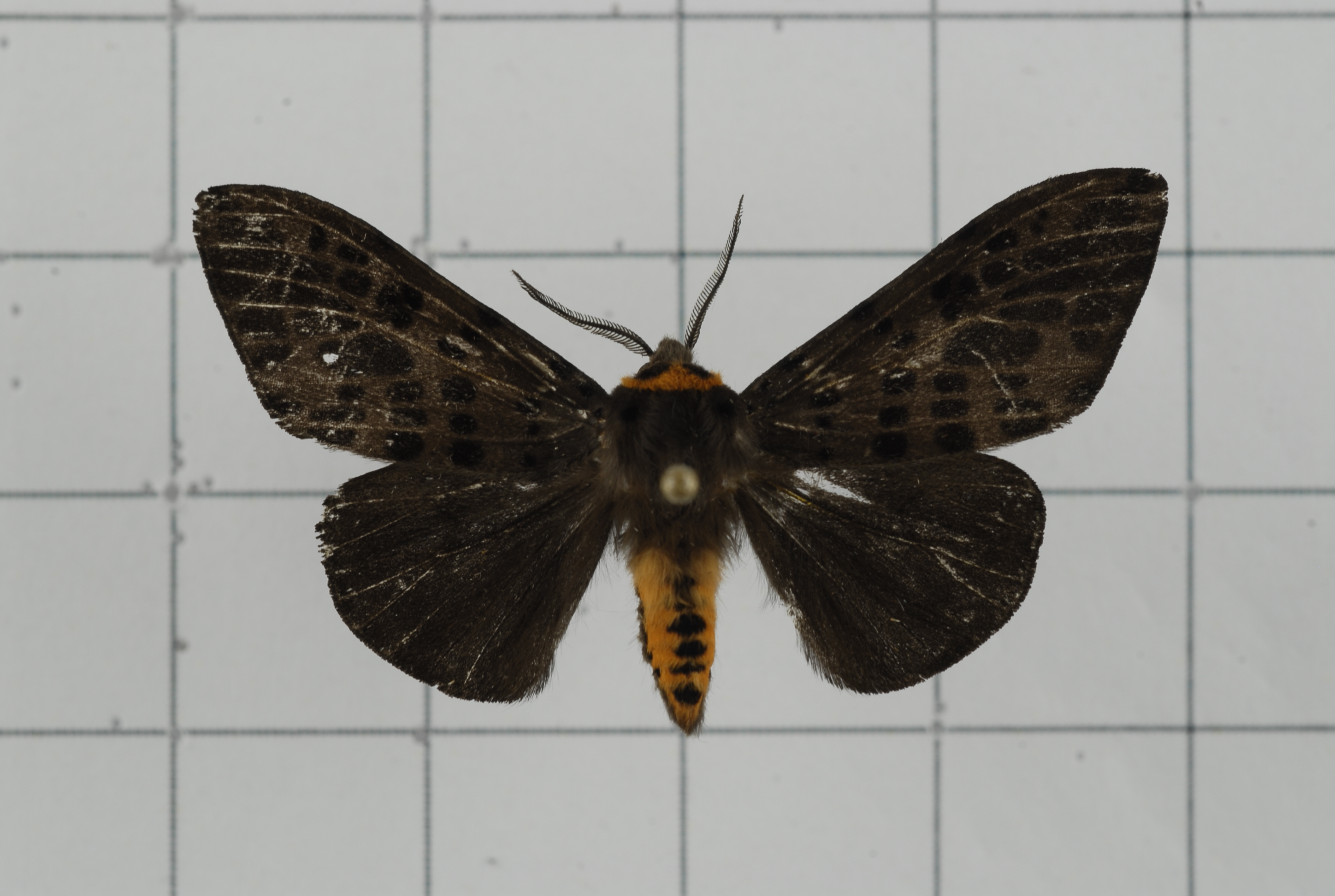

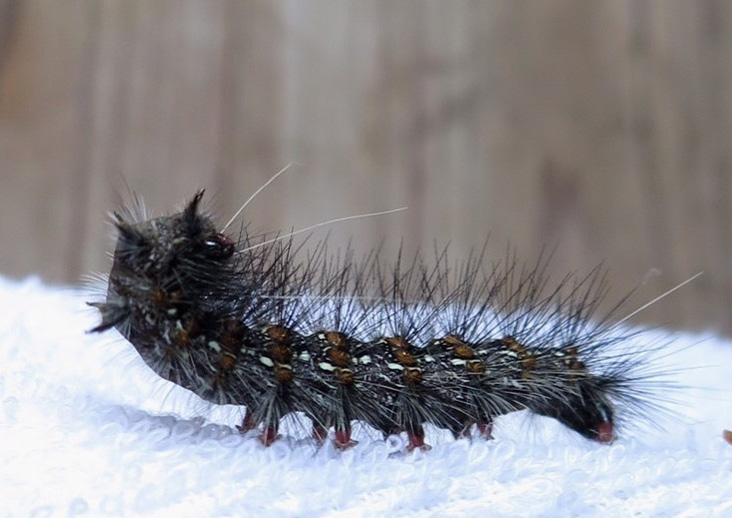
- Larva

Scientific classification
- Domain: Eukaryota
- Kingdom: Animalia
- Phylum: Arthropoda
- Class: Insecta
- Order: Lepidoptera
- Superfamily: Noctuoidea
- Family: Erebidae
- Subfamily: Arctiinae
- Genus: Lemyra
- Species: L. imparilis

Binomial name
- Lemyra imparilis (Butler, 1877)

Synonyms
- Spilarctia imparilis Butler, 1877; Diacrisia jezoensis Matsumura, 1927

= Lemyra imparilis =

Species of moth

Lemyra imparilis is a moth of the family Erebidae. It was described by Arthur Gardiner Butler in 1877. It is found in China (Guangdong, Liaonin, Hebei, Shandong, Jiangxi, Hunan, Fujian, Beijing), Taiwan, Japan and Korea.
