= Lemyra punctatostrigata =

Scientific classification
- Domain: Eukaryota
- Kingdom: Animalia
- Phylum: Arthropoda
- Class: Insecta
- Order: Lepidoptera
- Superfamily: Noctuoidea
- Family: Erebidae
- Subfamily: Arctiinae
- Genus: Lemyra
- Species: L. punctatostrigata

Binomial name
- Lemyra punctatostrigata (Bethune-Baker, 1904)

Synonyms
- Maenas punctatostrigata Bethune-Baker, 1904; Spilosoma avola Bethune-Baker, 1908; Maenas punctatostrigata ceramensis Talbot, 1929

Species of moth

Lemyra punctatostrigata is a moth of the family Erebidae. It was described by George Thomas Bethune-Baker in 1904. It is found in New Guinea and on Seram. The habitat consists of areas near river systems at moderate altitudes.
