= Lemyra philippinica =

Scientific classification
- Domain: Eukaryota
- Kingdom: Animalia
- Phylum: Arthropoda
- Class: Insecta
- Order: Lepidoptera
- Superfamily: Noctuoidea
- Family: Erebidae
- Subfamily: Arctiinae
- Genus: Lemyra
- Species: L. philippinica

Binomial name
- Lemyra philippinica Thomas, 1990

Species of moth

Lemyra philippinica is a moth of the family Erebidae. It was described by Thomas in 1990. It is found on the Philippines (Luzon, Mindanao, Leite, Negros, Sebu). It is found in primary and secondary habitats, ranging from the lowlands up to altitudes of about 2,000 meters.
