= Lemyra hanoica =

Scientific classification
- Domain: Eukaryota
- Kingdom: Animalia
- Phylum: Arthropoda
- Class: Insecta
- Order: Lepidoptera
- Superfamily: Noctuoidea
- Family: Erebidae
- Subfamily: Arctiinae
- Genus: Lemyra
- Species: L. hanoica

Binomial name
- Lemyra hanoica (Daniel, 1953)

Synonyms
- Spilarctia hanoica Daniel, 1953; Spilosoma hanoica

Species of moth

Lemyra hanoica is a moth of the family Erebidae. It was described by Franz Daniel in 1953. It is found in Vietnam.
