= Lemyra quadrisaccus =

Scientific classification
- Kingdom: Animalia
- Phylum: Arthropoda
- Clade: Pancrustacea
- Class: Insecta
- Order: Lepidoptera
- Superfamily: Noctuoidea
- Family: Erebidae
- Subfamily: Arctiinae
- Genus: Lemyra
- Species: L. quadrisaccus

Binomial name
- Lemyra quadrisaccus (Holloway, 1982)

Synonyms
- Paralacydes quadrisaccus Holloway in Barlow, 1982

Species of moth

Lemyra quadrisaccus is a moth of the family Erebidae. It was described by Jeremy Daniel Holloway in 1982. It is found in Malaysia (Malacca), Thailand and Vietnam.
