= Lemyra bornemontana =

Scientific classification
- Kingdom: Animalia
- Phylum: Arthropoda
- Clade: Pancrustacea
- Class: Insecta
- Order: Lepidoptera
- Superfamily: Noctuoidea
- Family: Erebidae
- Subfamily: Arctiinae
- Genus: Lemyra
- Species: L. bornemontana

Binomial name
- Lemyra bornemontana Holloway, 1988

Species of moth

Lemyra bornemontana is a moth of the family Erebidae. It was described by Jeremy Daniel Holloway in 1988. It is found on Borneo. The habitat consists of upper montane forests.
