= Lemyra extensa =

Scientific classification
- Kingdom: Animalia
- Phylum: Arthropoda
- Class: Insecta
- Order: Lepidoptera
- Superfamily: Noctuoidea
- Family: Erebidae
- Subfamily: Arctiinae
- Genus: Lemyra
- Species: L. extensa

Binomial name
- Lemyra extensa Walker, 1856

Synonyms
- Maenas extensa

Species of moth

Lemyra extensa is a moth of the family Erebidae. It was described by Francis Walker in 1856. It is found on Sulawesi.
