= Lemyra singularis =

Scientific classification
- Domain: Eukaryota
- Kingdom: Animalia
- Phylum: Arthropoda
- Class: Insecta
- Order: Lepidoptera
- Superfamily: Noctuoidea
- Family: Erebidae
- Subfamily: Arctiinae
- Genus: Lemyra
- Species: L. singularis

Binomial name
- Lemyra singularis (Roepke, 1940)

Synonyms
- Xanthomaenas singularis Roepke, 1940; Secusio javanica Roepke, 1940

Species of moth

Lemyra singularis is a moth of the family Erebidae. It was described by Roepke in 1940. It is found on Java.
