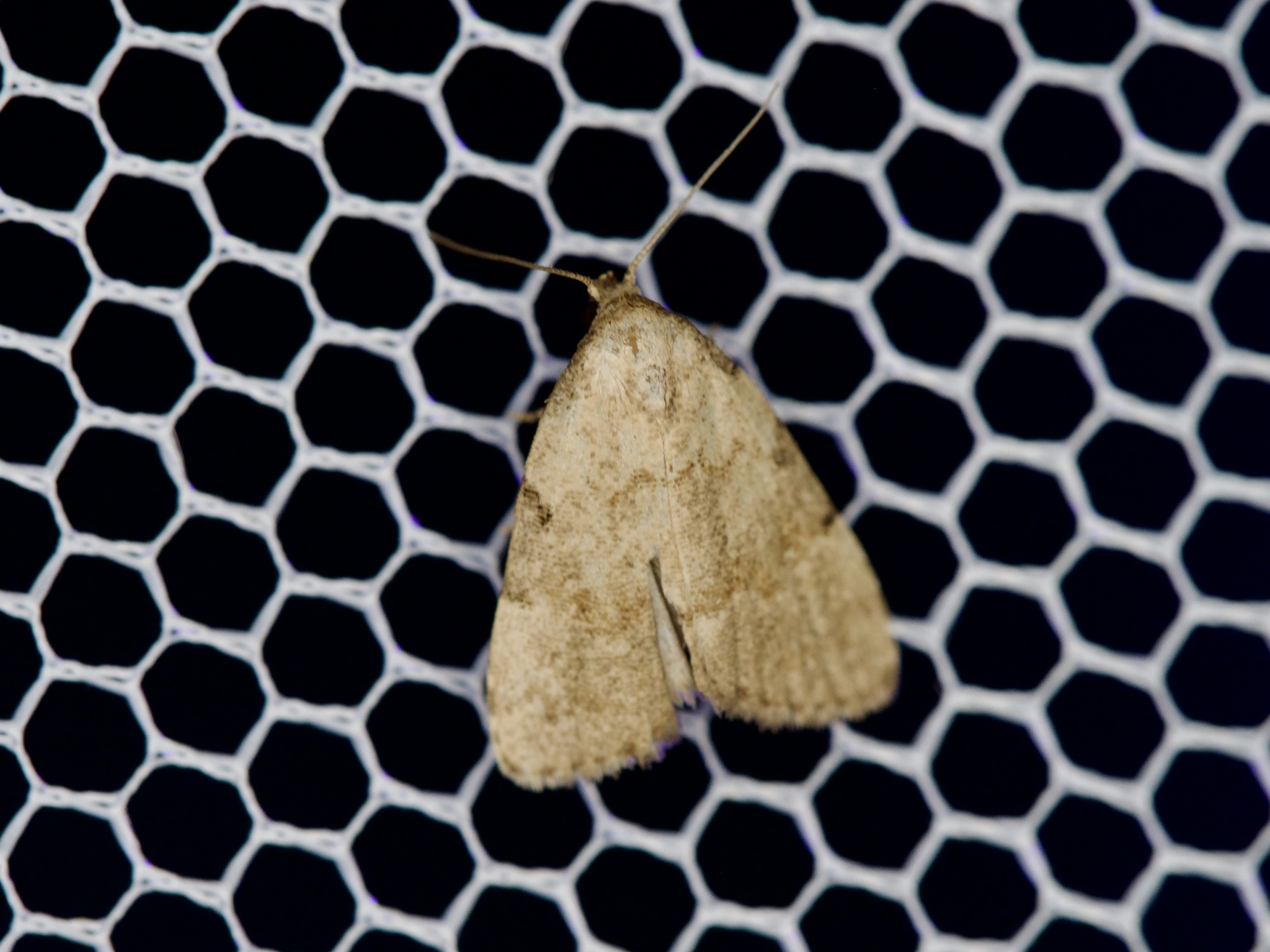
- Mimachrostia fasciata

Scientific classification
- Kingdom: Animalia
- Phylum: Arthropoda
- Class: Insecta
- Order: Lepidoptera
- Superfamily: Noctuoidea
- Family: Erebidae
- Tribe: Micronoctuini
- Subtribe: Parachrostiina; Fibiger, 2008

Synonyms
- Parachrostiinae Fibiger, 2008

= Parachrostiina =

Subtribe of moths

The Parachrostiina are a subtribe of moths of the family Erebidae. This clade was described by Michael Fibiger in 2008.

== Taxonomy ==
The subtribe was originally described as the subfamily Parachrostiinae of the family Micronoctuidae.

== Clades (former tribes) and genera ==
- Duplex clade
  - Duplex Fibiger, 2008
  - Sinochrostia Fibiger, 2010
- Parachrostia clade
  - Parachrostia Fibiger, 2008
  - Digita Fibiger, 2008
  - Anellus Fibiger, 2008
  - Taiwani Fibiger, 2008
  - Mimachrostia Sugi, 1982
