= Parachrostia owadai =

Scientific classification
- Kingdom: Animalia
- Phylum: Arthropoda
- Clade: Pancrustacea
- Class: Insecta
- Order: Lepidoptera
- Superfamily: Noctuoidea
- Family: Erebidae
- Genus: Parachrostia
- Species: P. owadai

Binomial name
- Parachrostia owadai (Sugi, 1982)

Synonyms
- Mimachrostia owadai Sugi, 1982

Species of moth

Parachrostia owadai is a moth of the family Erebidae first described by Shigero Sugi in 1982. It is known from Okinawa, Tokunoshima and Iheyajima, islands southwest of Japan.

Adults have been found in May, September, October, and November, but probably occur in numerous generations.

The wingspan is 11–13 mm.
