= Parachrostia yoshimotoi =

Scientific classification
- Domain: Eukaryota
- Kingdom: Animalia
- Phylum: Arthropoda
- Class: Insecta
- Order: Lepidoptera
- Superfamily: Noctuoidea
- Family: Erebidae
- Genus: Parachrostia
- Species: P. yoshimotoi

Binomial name
- Parachrostia yoshimotoi Fibiger, 2008

Species of moth

Parachrostia yoshimotoi is a moth of the family Erebidae first described by Michael Fibiger in 2008. It is known from Taiwan and along the eastern and south-eastern coast of China.

Adults have been found from the beginning of April to the end of September, suggesting several generations per year.

The wingspan is 10.5–12 mm.
