= Digita =

Scientific classification
- Domain: Eukaryota
- Kingdom: Animalia
- Phylum: Arthropoda
- Class: Insecta
- Order: Lepidoptera
- Superfamily: Noctuoidea
- Family: Erebidae
- Subtribe: Parachrostiina
- Genus: Digita; Fibiger, 2008

Genus of moths

Digita is a genus of moths of the family Erebidae erected by Michael Fibiger in 2008.

== Species ==
- Digita biuncus Fibiger, 2008
- Digita ampullai Fibiger, 2008
