= Digita ampullai =

Scientific classification
- Kingdom: Animalia
- Phylum: Arthropoda
- Class: Insecta
- Order: Lepidoptera
- Superfamily: Noctuoidea
- Family: Erebidae
- Genus: Digita
- Species: D. ampullai

Binomial name
- Digita ampullai Fibiger, 2008

Species of moth

Digita ampullai is a moth of the family Erebidae first described by Michael Fibiger in 2008. It is known from Taiwan.

Adults have been found from March to December, probably in several generations.

The wingspan is 9–10 mm.
