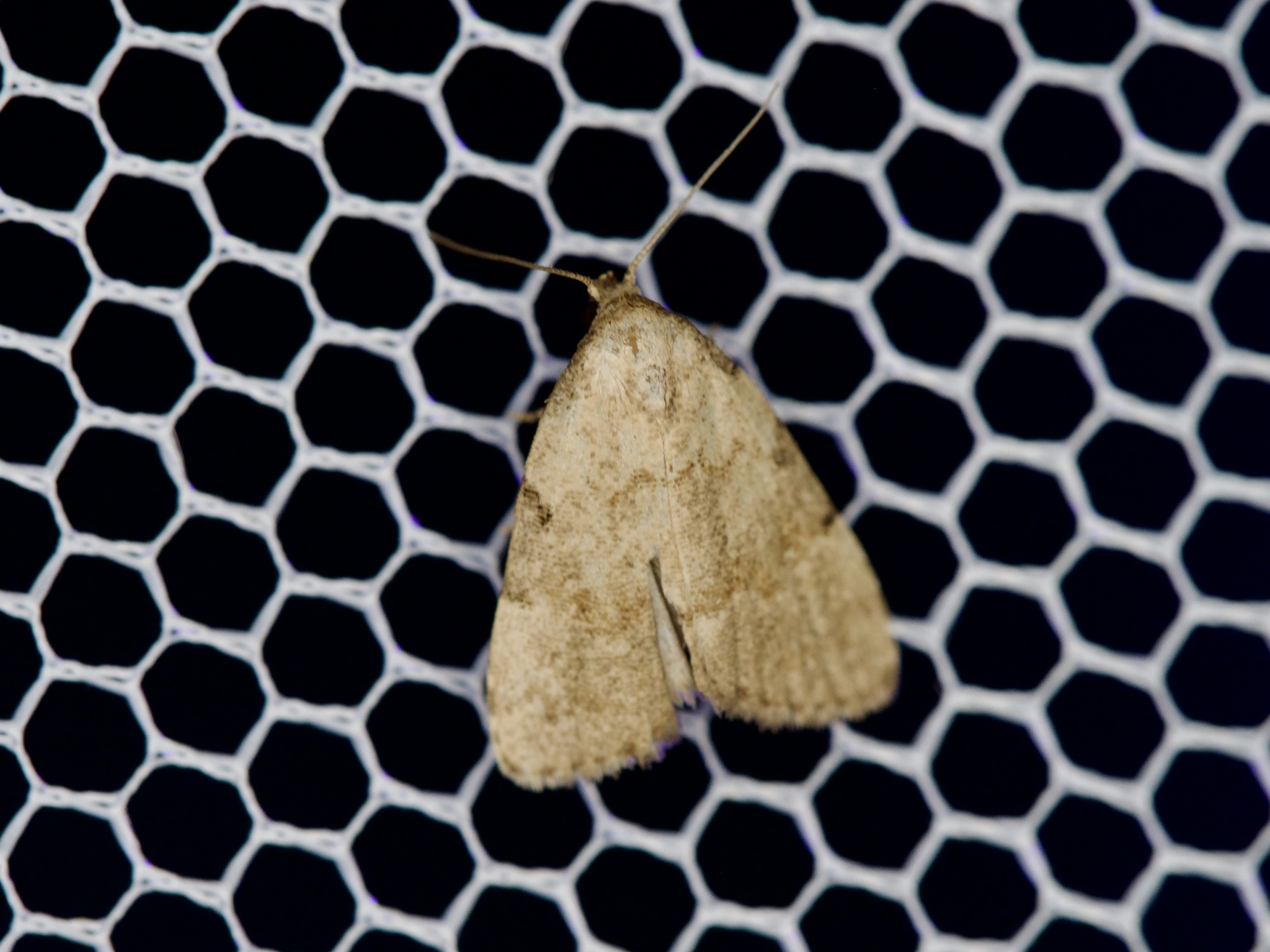
- Mimachrostia fasciata

Scientific classification
- Kingdom: Animalia
- Phylum: Arthropoda
- Clade: Pancrustacea
- Class: Insecta
- Order: Lepidoptera
- Superfamily: Noctuoidea
- Family: Erebidae
- Subtribe: Parachrostiina
- Genus: Mimachrostia; Sugi, 1982

= Mimachrostia =

Genus of moths

Mimachrostia is a genus of moths of the family Erebidae first described by Shigero Sugi in 1982. It was formerly placed in the family Noctuidae.

== Species ==
- Mimachrostia fasciata Sugi, 1982
  - Mimachrostia fasciata fasciata
  - Mimachrostia fasciata minimus Fibiger, 2010
- Mimachrostia parafasciata Fibiger, 2008
- Mimachrostia costafasciata Fibiger, 2008
- Mimachrostia novofasciata Fibiger, 2010
