= Parachrostia kishidai =

Scientific classification
- Kingdom: Animalia
- Phylum: Arthropoda
- Class: Insecta
- Order: Lepidoptera
- Superfamily: Noctuoidea
- Family: Erebidae
- Genus: Parachrostia
- Species: P. kishidai

Binomial name
- Parachrostia kishidai Fibiger, 2008

Species of moth

Parachrostia kishidai is a moth of the family Erebidae first described by Michael Fibiger in 2008. It is known from Amami Ōshima, an island southwest of Japan.

Adults have been found in August and October, but probably occur in several generations.

The wingspan is 11–12.5 mm.
