= Parachrostia sugii =

Scientific classification
- Domain: Eukaryota
- Kingdom: Animalia
- Phylum: Arthropoda
- Class: Insecta
- Order: Lepidoptera
- Superfamily: Noctuoidea
- Family: Erebidae
- Genus: Parachrostia
- Species: P. sugii

Binomial name
- Parachrostia sugii Fibiger, 2008

Species of moth

Parachrostia sugii is a moth of the family Erebidae first described by Michael Fibiger in 2008. It is known from Japan's Ryukyu Islands, Iriomote and Ishigaki.

Adults have been found in August, but probably occur in several generations.

The wingspan is 9.5–11 mm.
