= Taiwani yoshimotoi =

Scientific classification
- Domain: Eukaryota
- Kingdom: Animalia
- Phylum: Arthropoda
- Class: Insecta
- Order: Lepidoptera
- Superfamily: Noctuoidea
- Family: Erebidae
- Genus: Taiwani
- Species: T. yoshimotoi

Binomial name
- Taiwani yoshimotoi Fibiger, 2008

Species of moth

Taiwani yoshimotoi is a moth of the family Erebidae first described by Michael Fibiger in 2008. It is known from Taiwan.

Adults have been found in April and August. It probably occurs in several generations.

The wingspan is 12–15 mm.
