= Mimachrostia parafasciata =

Scientific classification
- Domain: Eukaryota
- Kingdom: Animalia
- Phylum: Arthropoda
- Class: Insecta
- Order: Lepidoptera
- Superfamily: Noctuoidea
- Family: Erebidae
- Genus: Mimachrostia
- Species: M. parafasciata

Binomial name
- Mimachrostia parafasciata Fibiger, 2008

Species of moth

Mimachrostia parafasciata is a moth of the family Erebidae first described by Michael Fibiger in 2008. It is known from Zhejiang and Jiangsu in eastern China.

Adults have been found in May and June, but probably occur in several generations.

The wingspan is 13.5–14 mm.
