= Taiwani bialbipuncta =

Scientific classification
- Domain: Eukaryota
- Kingdom: Animalia
- Phylum: Arthropoda
- Class: Insecta
- Order: Lepidoptera
- Superfamily: Noctuoidea
- Family: Erebidae
- Genus: Taiwani
- Species: T. bialbipuncta

Binomial name
- Taiwani bialbipuncta Fibiger, 2008

Species of moth

Taiwani bialbipuncta is a moth of the family Erebidae first described by Michael Fibiger in 2008. It is known from Taiwan and eastern China.

Adults have been found in April, June and September. There are probably several generations per year.

The wingspan is 12–16 mm.
