= Taiwani =

Scientific classification
- Domain: Eukaryota
- Kingdom: Animalia
- Phylum: Arthropoda
- Class: Insecta
- Order: Lepidoptera
- Superfamily: Noctuoidea
- Family: Erebidae
- Subtribe: Parachrostiina
- Genus: Taiwani; Fibiger, 2008

Genus of moths

Taiwani is a genus of moths of the family Erebidae erected by Michael Fibiger in 2008.

== Species ==
- Taiwani yoshimotoi Fibiger, 2008
- Taiwani imperator Fibiger, 2008
- Taiwani albipuncta (Wileman, 1915)
- Taiwani bialbipuncta Fibiger, 2008
