= Taiwani albipuncta =

Scientific classification
- Domain: Eukaryota
- Kingdom: Animalia
- Phylum: Arthropoda
- Class: Insecta
- Order: Lepidoptera
- Superfamily: Noctuoidea
- Family: Erebidae
- Genus: Taiwani
- Species: T. albipuncta

Binomial name
- Taiwani albipuncta (Wileman, 1915)

Synonyms
- Eublemma albipuncta Wileman, 1915

Species of moth

Taiwani albipuncta is a moth of the family Erebidae first described by Wileman in 1915. It is known from Taiwan.

Adults have been found in March, April, May and June. There are probably several generations per year.

The wingspan is 14–17 mm.
