= Mimachrostia costafasciata =

Scientific classification
- Kingdom: Animalia
- Phylum: Arthropoda
- Class: Insecta
- Order: Lepidoptera
- Superfamily: Noctuoidea
- Family: Erebidae
- Genus: Mimachrostia
- Species: M. costafasciata

Binomial name
- Mimachrostia costafasciata Fibiger, 2008

Species of moth

Mimachrostia costafasciata is a moth of the family Erebidae first described by Michael Fibiger in 2008. It is known in northern Vietnam. Adults have been found in September. The wingspan is about 15 mm.
