= Taiwani imperator =

Scientific classification
- Domain: Eukaryota
- Kingdom: Animalia
- Phylum: Arthropoda
- Class: Insecta
- Order: Lepidoptera
- Superfamily: Noctuoidea
- Family: Erebidae
- Genus: Taiwani
- Species: T. imperator

Binomial name
- Taiwani imperator Fibiger, 2008

Species of moth

Taiwani imperator is a moth of the family Erebidae first described by Michael Fibiger in 2008. It is known from Taiwan.

Adults have been found in June, but probably have several generations per year.

The wingspan is 12–15 mm.
