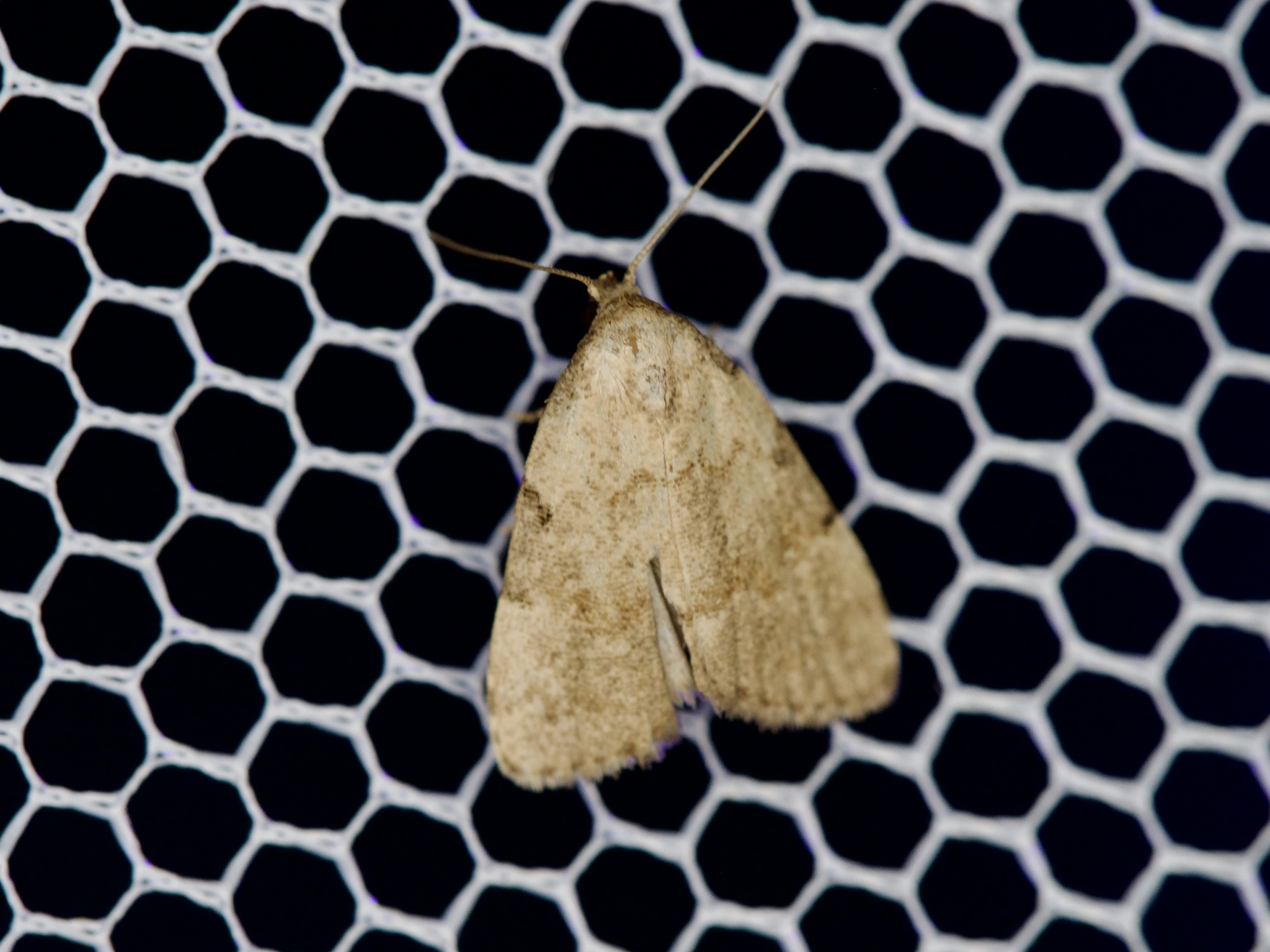

Scientific classification
- Kingdom: Animalia
- Phylum: Arthropoda
- Clade: Pancrustacea
- Class: Insecta
- Order: Lepidoptera
- Superfamily: Noctuoidea
- Family: Erebidae
- Genus: Mimachrostia
- Species: M. fasciata

Binomial name
- Mimachrostia fasciata Sugi, 1982

= Mimachrostia fasciata =

Species of moth

Mimachrostia fasciata is a moth of the family Erebidae first described by Shigero Sugi in 1982. It is known from North Korea, South Korea, the Japanese islands Hokkaido and Honshu and Tsushima, the Russian Far East and China. The habitat consists of rich broadleaved forests.

Adults have been found from May to September. There are probably several generations per year.

== Description ==
The wingspan is 13–15 mm for ssp. M. f. fasciata and 10–12 mm for ssp. M. f. minimus.

== Subspecies ==
- Mimachrostia fasciata fasciata
- Mimachrostia fasciata minimus Fibiger, 2010 (Tsushima)
