= Parachrostia =

Scientific classification
- Domain: Eukaryota
- Kingdom: Animalia
- Phylum: Arthropoda
- Class: Insecta
- Order: Lepidoptera
- Superfamily: Noctuoidea
- Family: Erebidae
- Subtribe: Parachrostiina
- Genus: Parachrostia; Fibiger, 2008

Genus of moths

Parachrostia is a genus of moths of the family Erebidae erected by Michael Fibiger in 2008.

== Species ==
- Parachrostia yoshimotoi Fibiger, 2008
- Parachrostia sugii Fibiger, 2008
- Parachrostia kishidai Fibiger, 2008
- Parachrostia owadai (Sugi, 1982)
- Parachrostia pura Fibiger, 2011
