= Digita biuncus =

Scientific classification
- Domain: Eukaryota
- Kingdom: Animalia
- Phylum: Arthropoda
- Class: Insecta
- Order: Lepidoptera
- Superfamily: Noctuoidea
- Family: Erebidae
- Genus: Digita
- Species: D. biuncus

Binomial name
- Digita biuncus Fibiger, 2008

Species of moth

Digita biuncus is a moth of the family Erebidae first described by Michael Fibiger in 2008. It is known from Taiwan.

Adults have been found in April, August and September. There are probably two generations per year.

The wingspan is 10–12.5 mm (0.4–0.5 in).
