= Parachrostia pura =

Scientific classification
- Kingdom: Animalia
- Phylum: Arthropoda
- Class: Insecta
- Order: Lepidoptera
- Superfamily: Noctuoidea
- Family: Erebidae
- Genus: Parachrostia
- Species: P. pura

Binomial name
- Parachrostia pura Fibiger, 2011

Species of moth

Parachrostia pura is a moth of the family Erebidae first described by Michael Fibiger in 2011. It is known from Guizhou in China.

The wingspan is 10–11 mm. All specimens were captured at light in mid-September.
