= Anellus =

Scientific classification
- Domain: Eukaryota
- Kingdom: Animalia
- Phylum: Arthropoda
- Class: Insecta
- Order: Lepidoptera
- Superfamily: Noctuoidea
- Family: Erebidae
- Genus: Anellus; Fibiger, 2008
- Species: A. edai

Binomial name
- Anellus edai Fibiger, 2008

Genus of moths

Anellus is a monotypic moth genus of the family Erebidae. Its only species, Anellus edai, is known from Ishigaki Island, which is southwest of Japan. Both the genus and the species were first described by Michael Fibiger in 2008.

Adults have been found in March and August. There are probably several generations per year.

The wingspan is 7–9 mm.
