= Sinochrostia =

Scientific classification
- Domain: Eukaryota
- Kingdom: Animalia
- Phylum: Arthropoda
- Class: Insecta
- Order: Lepidoptera
- Superfamily: Noctuoidea
- Family: Erebidae
- Genus: Sinochrostia; Fibiger, 2010
- Species: S. sichuanensis

Binomial name
- Sinochrostia sichuanensis Fibiger, 2010

Genus of moths

Sinochrostia is a monotypic moth genus of the family Erebidae. Its only species, Sinochrostia sichuanensis, is known from south-eastern China. Both the genus and the species were first described by Michael Fibiger in 2010.

The wingspan is 13–14 mm.
