= Asuridia yuennanica =

Scientific classification
- Domain: Eukaryota
- Kingdom: Animalia
- Phylum: Arthropoda
- Class: Insecta
- Order: Lepidoptera
- Superfamily: Noctuoidea
- Family: Erebidae
- Subfamily: Arctiinae
- Genus: Asuridia
- Species: A. yuennanica

Binomial name
- Asuridia yuennanica Daniel, 1951

Species of moth

Asuridia yuennanica is a moth of the family Erebidae. It is found in China (Yunnan).
