= Asuridia nigriradiata =

Scientific classification
- Kingdom: Animalia
- Phylum: Arthropoda
- Class: Insecta
- Order: Lepidoptera
- Superfamily: Noctuoidea
- Family: Erebidae
- Subfamily: Arctiinae
- Genus: Asuridia
- Species: A. nigriradiata

Binomial name
- Asuridia nigriradiata (Hampson, 1896)

Synonyms
- Miltochrista nigriradiata Hampson, 1896

Species of moth

Asuridia nigriradiata is a moth of the family Erebidae first described by George Hampson in 1896. It is found in Bhutan.
