= Asuridia subcruciata =

Scientific classification
- Domain: Eukaryota
- Kingdom: Animalia
- Phylum: Arthropoda
- Class: Insecta
- Order: Lepidoptera
- Superfamily: Noctuoidea
- Family: Erebidae
- Subfamily: Arctiinae
- Genus: Asuridia
- Species: A. subcruciata

Binomial name
- Asuridia subcruciata (Rothschild, 1913)

Synonyms
- Miltochrista subcruciata Rothschild, 1913

Species of moth

Asuridia subcruciata is a moth of the family Erebidae first described by Walter Rothschild in 1913. The type location is Little Kei Island.
