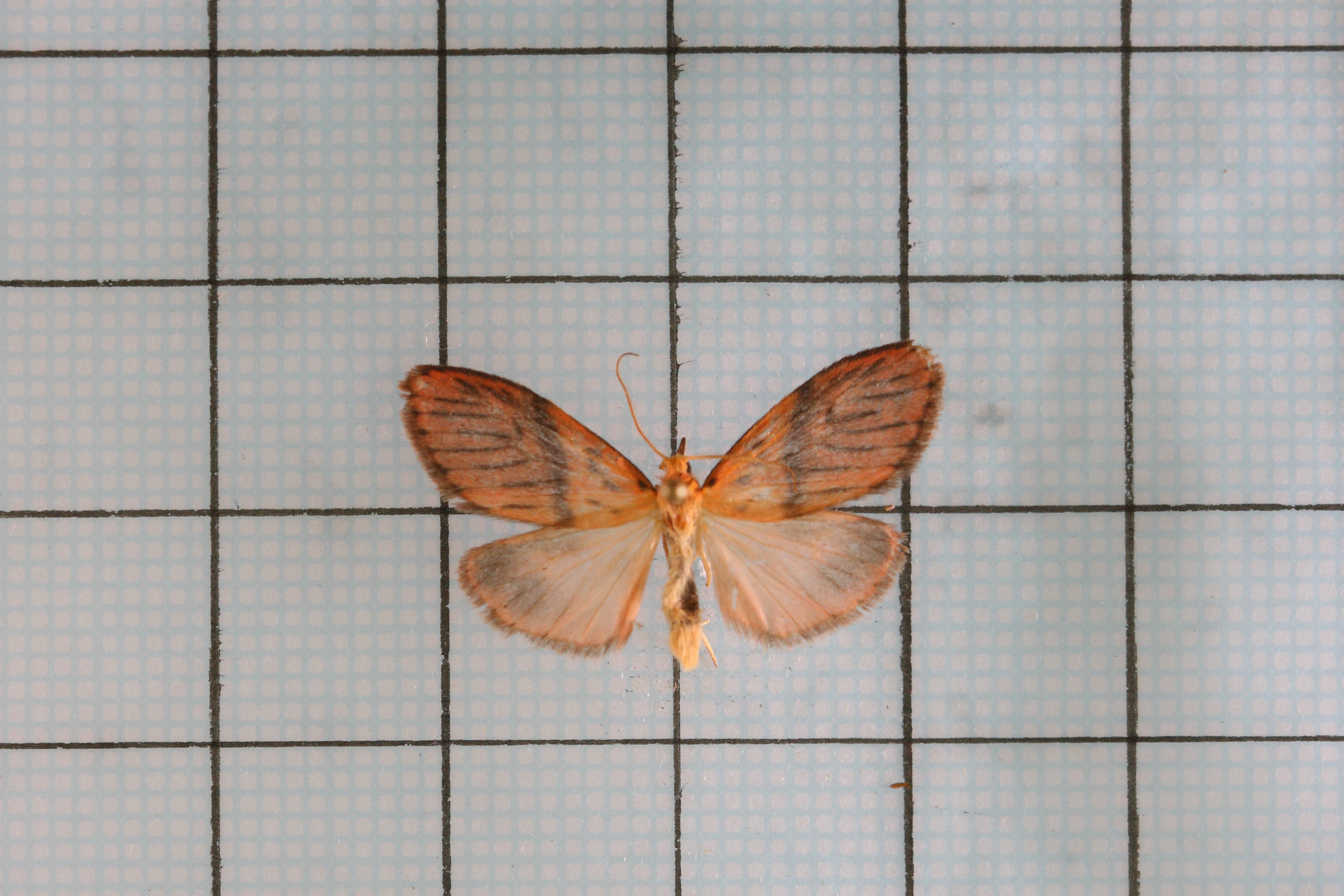
- Asuridia rubripennis

Scientific classification
- Kingdom: Animalia
- Phylum: Arthropoda
- Class: Insecta
- Order: Lepidoptera
- Superfamily: Noctuoidea
- Family: Erebidae
- Subfamily: Arctiinae
- Subtribe: Nudariina
- Genus: Asuridia; Hampson, 1900

= Asuridia =

Genus of moths

Asuridia is a genus of moths in the subfamily Arctiinae. The genus was erected by George Hampson in 1900.

== Species ==
- Asuridia carnipicta
- Asuridia decussa
- Asuridia metaphaea
- Asuridia miltochristoides
- Asuridia nigriradiata
- Asuridia nigrisparsa
- Asuridia phoenicea
- Asuridia ridibunda
- Asuridia rubripennis
- Asuridia subcruciata
- Asuridia yuennanica
