= Asuridia carnipicta =

Scientific classification
- Domain: Eukaryota
- Kingdom: Animalia
- Phylum: Arthropoda
- Class: Insecta
- Order: Lepidoptera
- Superfamily: Noctuoidea
- Family: Erebidae
- Subfamily: Arctiinae
- Genus: Asuridia
- Species: A. carnipicta

Binomial name
- Asuridia carnipicta (Butler, 1877)

Synonyms
- Ammatho carnipicta Butler, 1877

Species of moth

Asuridia carnipicta is a moth of the family Erebidae first described by Arthur Gardiner Butler in 1877. It is found in China.
