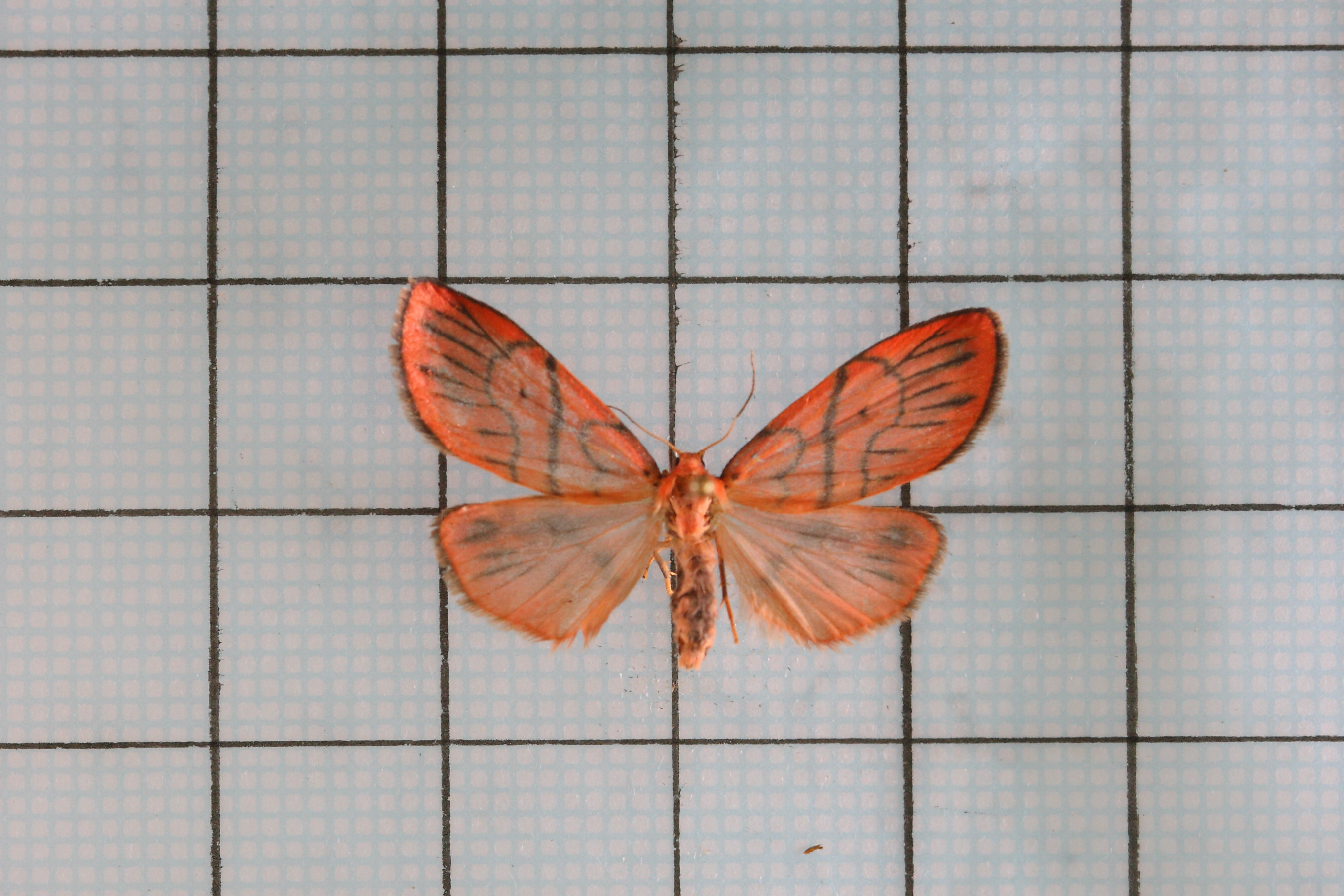

Scientific classification
- Kingdom: Animalia
- Phylum: Arthropoda
- Class: Insecta
- Order: Lepidoptera
- Superfamily: Noctuoidea
- Family: Erebidae
- Subfamily: Arctiinae
- Genus: Asuridia
- Species: A. rubripennis

Binomial name
- Asuridia rubripennis Inoue, 1988

= Asuridia rubripennis =

Species of moth

Asuridia rubripennis is a moth of the family Erebidae. It is found in Taiwan.
