= Asuridia decussa =

Scientific classification
- Domain: Eukaryota
- Kingdom: Animalia
- Phylum: Arthropoda
- Class: Insecta
- Order: Lepidoptera
- Superfamily: Noctuoidea
- Family: Erebidae
- Subfamily: Arctiinae
- Genus: Asuridia
- Species: A. decussa

Binomial name
- Asuridia decussa (Bethune-Baker, 1910)

Synonyms
- Asura decussa Bethune-Baker, 1910

Species of moth

Asuridia decussa is a moth of the family Erebidae. It is found in New Guinea.
