= Asuridia metaphaea =

Scientific classification
- Kingdom: Animalia
- Phylum: Arthropoda
- Class: Insecta
- Order: Lepidoptera
- Superfamily: Noctuoidea
- Family: Erebidae
- Subfamily: Arctiinae
- Genus: Asuridia
- Species: A. metaphaea

Binomial name
- Asuridia metaphaea Hampson, 1900

Species of moth

Asuridia metaphaea is a moth of the family Erebidae first described by George Hampson in 1900. It is found in Sikkim, India.
