= Asuridia miltochristoides =

Scientific classification
- Domain: Eukaryota
- Kingdom: Animalia
- Phylum: Arthropoda
- Class: Insecta
- Order: Lepidoptera
- Superfamily: Noctuoidea
- Family: Erebidae
- Subfamily: Arctiinae
- Genus: Asuridia
- Species: A. miltochristoides

Binomial name
- Asuridia miltochristoides Rothschild, 1913

Species of moth

Asuridia miltochristoides is a moth of the family Erebidae. It is found in the Khasia Hills.

The length of the forewings is 13–15 mm. The forewings are pale carmine-rose, with a basal black spot on the subcostal vein. There is an antemedian zigzag line, an oblique median broad line, a stigma, and a twice sharply angled postmedian line with black lines running from it to the termen along the black edged with yellow. The hindwings are rose.
