= Asuridia nigrisparsa =

Scientific classification
- Kingdom: Animalia
- Phylum: Arthropoda
- Class: Insecta
- Order: Lepidoptera
- Superfamily: Noctuoidea
- Family: Erebidae
- Subfamily: Arctiinae
- Genus: Asuridia
- Species: A. nigrisparsa

Binomial name
- Asuridia nigrisparsa Hampson, 1914

Species of moth

Asuridia nigrisparsa is a moth of the family Erebidae. It is found in New Guinea.
