= Asuridia phoenicea =

Scientific classification
- Kingdom: Animalia
- Phylum: Arthropoda
- Class: Insecta
- Order: Lepidoptera
- Superfamily: Noctuoidea
- Family: Erebidae
- Subfamily: Arctiinae
- Genus: Asuridia
- Species: A. phoenicea

Binomial name
- Asuridia phoenicea Hampson, 1914

Species of moth

Asuridia phoenicea is a moth of the family Erebidae. It is found on Goodenough Island.
