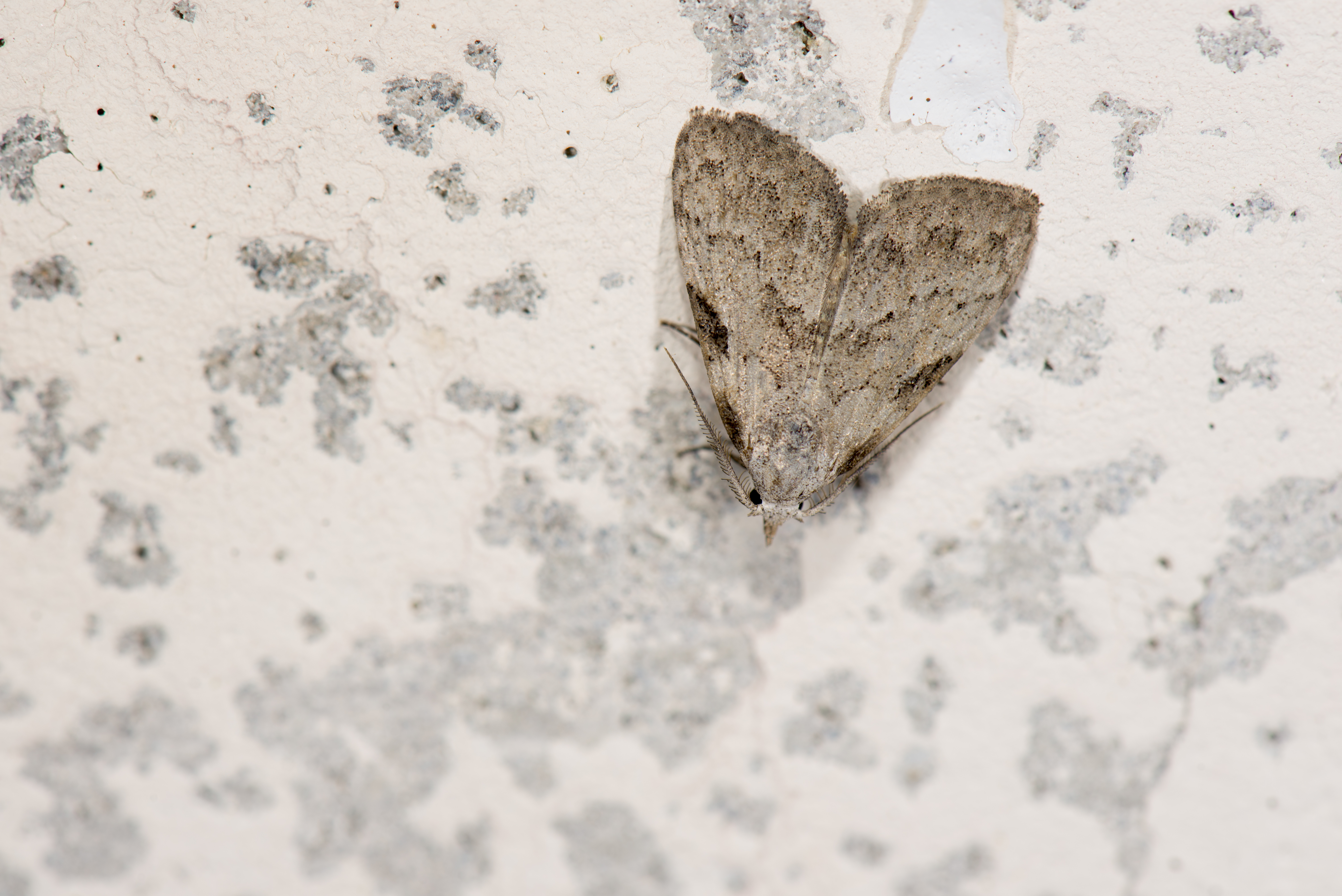
- Manoba species

Scientific classification
- Kingdom: Animalia
- Phylum: Arthropoda
- Class: Insecta
- Order: Lepidoptera
- Superfamily: Noctuoidea
- Family: Nolidae
- Subfamily: Nolinae
- Genus: Manoba; Walker, 1863

Synonyms
- Rhynchopalpus Hampson, 1894

= Manoba =

Genus of moths

Manoba is a genus of moths in the family Nolidae. The genus was first described by Francis Walker in 1863.

== Description ==
Palpi long and porrect (extending forward), where the first two joints thickly scaled. Antennae heavily bipectinated (comb like on both sides) in male. Mid tibia with single pair of spurs, and hind tibia with two pairs. Forewings with vein 3 from before angle of cell, veins 4 and 5 from angle, vein 6 from upper angle, veins 7 and 8 stalked and veins 9 and 10 absent. Hindwings with vein 3 from before angle of cell, vein 5 absent, veins 6 and 7 stalked, and vein 8 from middle of cell.

== Species ==
- Manoba adriennae László, G. Ronkay & Witt, 2010
- Manoba allani Holloway, 2003
- Manoba albina Rothschild, 1912
- Manoba albiplagiata Rothschild, 1912
- Manoba argentalis (Moore, 1867)
- Manoba argentaloides Holloway, 2003
- Manoba banghaasi (West, 1929)
- Manoba briggsi Holloway, 2003
- Manoba bulli Holloway, 2003
- Manoba carrei Holloway, 2003
- Manoba chamberlaini Holloway, 2003
- Manoba chirgwini Holloway, 2003
- Manoba coadei Holloway, 2003
- Manoba coxi Holloway, 2003
- Manoba costimaculata Kiriakoff, 1958
- Manoba cowleyi Holloway, 2003
- Manoba divisa Rothschild, 1913
- Manoba fasciatus (Hampson, 1894)
- Manoba gilletti Holloway, 2003
- Manoba goodfieldi Holloway, 2003
- Manoba greenwoodi Holloway, 2003
- Manoba grisealis (Swinhoe, 1895)
- Manoba grisescens Rothschild, 1912
- Manoba gyulaipeteri László, G. Ronkay & Witt, 2010
- Manoba harthani (Holloway, 1976)
- Manoba implens Walker, 1863
- Manoba izuensis (Inoue, 1961)
- Manoba javanica (van Eecke, 1920)
- Manoba jinghongensis T.Y. Shao, C.D. Li & H.L. Han, 2009
- Manoba lactogrisea Rothschild, 1912
- Manoba lativittata (Moore, 1888)
- Manoba lilliptiana (Inoue, 1998)
- Manoba major (Hampson, 1891)
- Manoba marshalli Holloway, 2003
- Manoba melancholica (Wileman & West, 1928)
- Manoba melanomedia (Inoue, 1991)
- Manoba melanota (Hampson, 1900)
- Manoba microphasma (Butler, 1885)
- Manoba munda de Joannis, 1928
- Manoba paucilinea de Joannis, 1928
- Manoba phaeochroa (Hampson, 1900)
- Manoba poecila (Wileman & West, 1928)
- Manoba postpuncta Rothschild, 1913
- Manoba potterorum Holloway, 2003
- Manoba punctilineata (Hampson, 1896)
- Manoba rennicki Holloway, 2003
- Manoba ronkaylaszloi László, G. Ronkay & Witt, 2010
- Manoba shrimptoni Holloway, 2003
- Manoba subfuscataria (Inoue, 1998)
- Manoba subtribei H.L. Han & C.D. Li, 2008
- Manoba suffusata (Wileman & West, 1929)
- Manoba sumatrana (Roepke, 1948)
- Manoba terminalis Rothschild, 1912
- Manoba tesselata (Hampson, 1896)
- Manoba tribei Holloway, 2003
- Manoba triparallellinea (van Eecke, 1920)
- Manoba tristicta (Hampson, 1900)
- Manoba umbrimedia De Joannis, 1928

== Selected former species ==
- Manoba bipunctulata van Eecke, 1927
- Manoba brunellus (Hampson, 1893)
- Manoba erythromedia (Inoue, 1998)
- Manoba fractilinea Snellen, 1880
- Manoba obliquilinea Hampson, 1900
- Manoba obscura Inoue, 1976
- Manoba rectilinea Snellen, 1879
- Manoba rufofasciata Rothschild, 1913
- Manoba taeniatus Rothschild, 1916
- Manoba umbrata van Eecke, 1927
- Manoba yoshimotoi Inoue, 2000

== Taxonomy ==
Some sources list Manoba as a synonym of Nola Leach, 1815.
