= N. cinerea =

N. cinerea is an abbreviated binomial name that may refer to the following species:

== Bacteria ==
- Neisseria cinerea – a proteobacterium

== Plants ==
- Namibia cinerea – a dicot

== Insects ==
- Nauphoeta cinerea – speckled cockroach
- Nemacerota cinerea – a moth
- Nepa cinerea – a water scorpion

== Mammals ==
- Neophoca cinerea – Australian sea lion
- Neotoma cinerea – bushy-tailed woodrat
