= Nemacerota igorkostjuki =

Scientific classification
- Kingdom: Animalia
- Phylum: Arthropoda
- Clade: Pancrustacea
- Class: Insecta
- Order: Lepidoptera
- Family: Drepanidae
- Genus: Nemacerota
- Species: N. igorkostjuki

Binomial name
- Nemacerota igorkostjuki László, G. Ronkay, L. Ronkay & Witt, 2007

Species of false owlet moth

Nemacerota igorkostjuki is a moth in the family Drepanidae. It was described by Gyula M. László, Gábor Ronkay, László Aladár Ronkay and Thomas Joseph Witt in 2007. It is found in southern edge of Tibet.
