= Manoba gyulaipeteri =

Scientific classification
- Kingdom: Animalia
- Phylum: Arthropoda
- Clade: Pancrustacea
- Class: Insecta
- Order: Lepidoptera
- Superfamily: Noctuoidea
- Family: Nolidae
- Genus: Manoba
- Species: M. gyulaipeteri

Binomial name
- Manoba gyulaipeteri László, G. Ronkay & Witt, 2010

Species of moth

Manoba gyulaipeteri is a moth in the family Nolidae. It was described by Gyula M. László, Gábor Ronkay and Thomas Joseph Witt in 2010. It is found in Thailand.
