= Urabá =

Urabá or Uraba may refer to:

- Gulf of Urabá, a gulf in the Caribbean Sea in Colombia
- Urabá Antioquia, a subregion of the Antioquia department, Colombia
- Urabá Chocoano, a subregion of the Chocó department, Colombia
- Urabá Island, an island in the Gulf of Panama
- Uraba (moth), a moth genus in the subfamily Nolinae of the family Nolidae.
- San Sebastián de Urabá, the first settlement established by Spaniards in the area of the Darién Gap in Colombia
