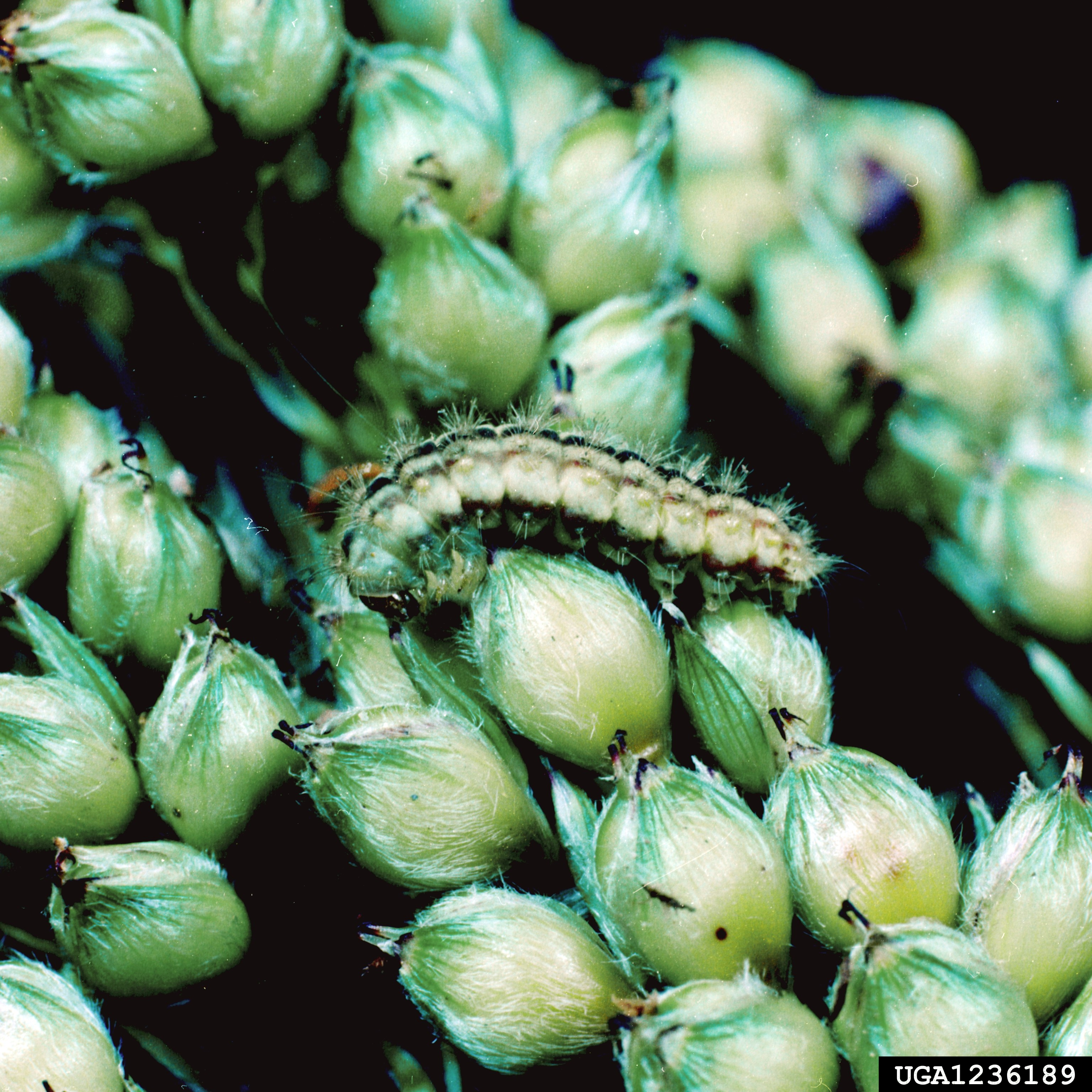
- Celama sorghiella caterpillar

Scientific classification
- Kingdom: Animalia
- Phylum: Arthropoda
- Clade: Pancrustacea
- Class: Insecta
- Order: Lepidoptera
- Superfamily: Noctuoidea
- Family: Nolidae
- Subfamily: Nolinae; Bruand, 1846

Genera
- 34, see text

= Nolinae =

Subfamily of moths

Nolinae is a subfamily of the moth family Nolidae. The subfamily was erected by Charles Théophile Bruand d'Uzelle in 1846. They resemble some Arctiidae in appearance.

== Genera ==
- Acatapaustus
- Aedemon
- Aquita
- Archinola
- Automala
- Casminola
- Celama
- Celamoides
- Celazia
- Ctenane
- Dialithoptera
- Elesma
- Eurynola
- Idiocyttara
- Inouenola
- Manoba
- Melanographia
- Metanola
- Mimerastria
- Neoniga
- Neonola
- Nola
- Nolidia
- Paranola
- Pisara
- Poecilonola
- Psygmomorpha
- Roeselia
- Sarbena
- Selca
- Sorocostia
- Spathoptila
- Supernola
- Uraba
- Vandamia
- Xenonola

== Former genera ==
- Melaleucia – transferred to Erebidae
