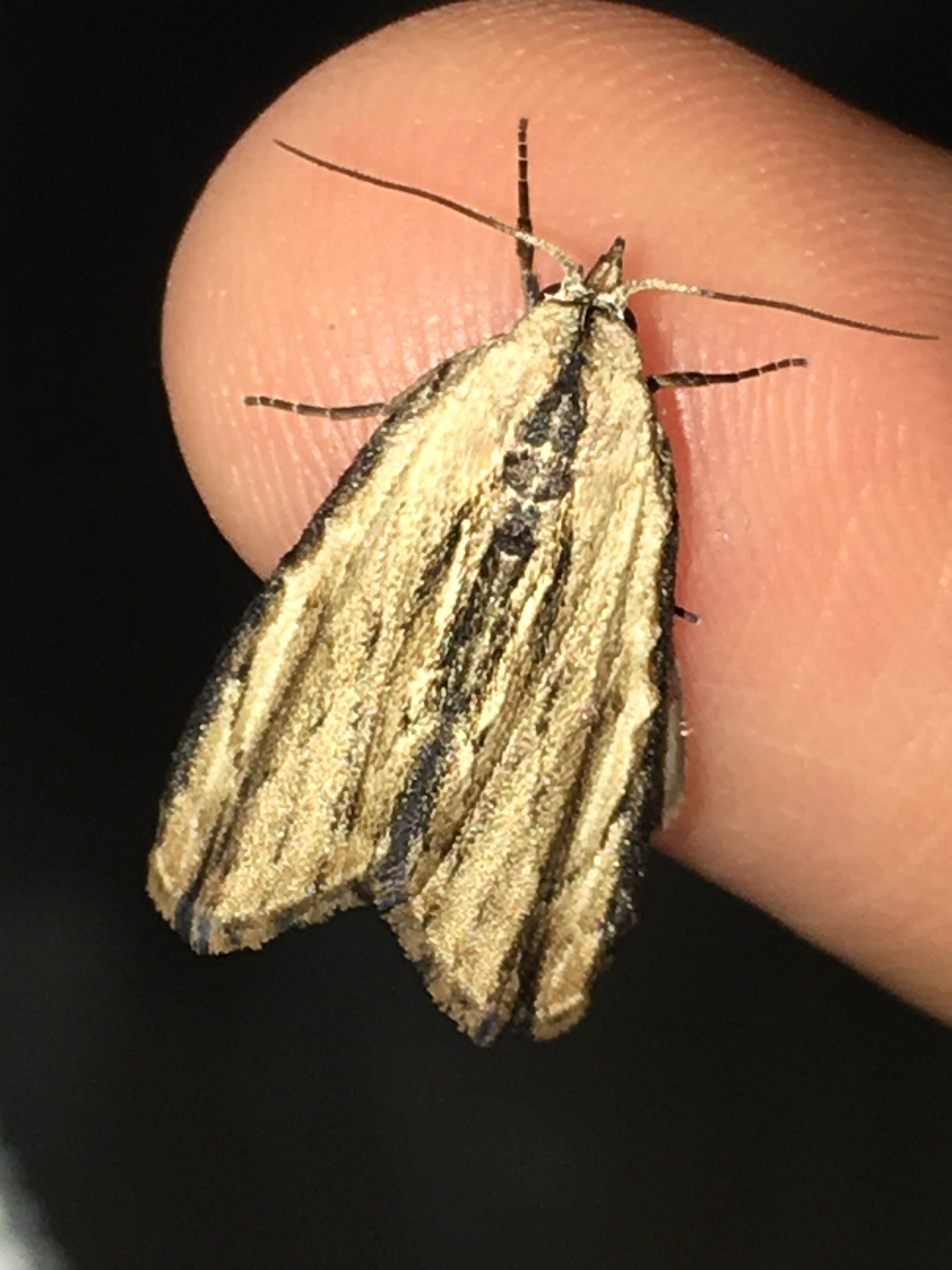
- Adult female

Scientific classification
- Kingdom: Animalia
- Phylum: Arthropoda
- Class: Insecta
- Order: Lepidoptera
- Superfamily: Noctuoidea
- Family: Nolidae
- Subfamily: Nolinae
- Genus: Sarbena; Walker, 1862

Type species
- Sarbena lignifera Walker, 1862

Synonyms
- Cyphotopsyche Hampson, 1895

= Sarbena =

Genus of moths

Sarbena is a genus of moths in the family Nolidae described by Francis Walker in 1862. They are found across Eastern, Southern, and South East Asia to the Solomon Islands. The caterpillars have white hairs and stack head capsules from past instars.

== Species ==
Known species include:

- Sarbena hollowayi László, Ronkay & Witt, 2004 Assam, Thailand, N.Vietnam, Malaysia, Sumatra, Celebes, Seram, Philippines, New Guinea, Solomon Islands
- Sarbena inouei László, Ronkay & Witt, 2004 Philippines (Cebu Island, Balabac, Mindoro)
- Sarbena ketipati László, Ronkay & Witt, 2004 Bali
- Sarbena lignifera Walker, 1862 Ceylon, Borneo, Sumatra, Bhutan, Vietnam, Thailand, Peninsular Malaysia, Philippines
- Sarbena mulaka Fischer, 2020 Maldives
- Sarbena sumatrana László, Ronkay & Witt, 2004 Sumatra
- Sarbena ustipennis (Hampson, 1895) Bhutan, Ceylon, Thailand, Taiwan, Japan

== See also ==
- Uraba lugens
