= Nemacerota stueningi =

Scientific classification
- Kingdom: Animalia
- Phylum: Arthropoda
- Clade: Pancrustacea
- Class: Insecta
- Order: Lepidoptera
- Family: Drepanidae
- Genus: Nemacerota
- Species: N. stueningi

Binomial name
- Nemacerota stueningi László, G. Ronkay, L. Ronkay & Witt, 2007

Species of false owlet moth

Nemacerota stueningi is a moth in the family Drepanidae, described by Gyula M. László, Gábor Ronkay, László Aladár Ronkay and Thomas Joseph Witt in 2007. It lives in Shaanxi, China.
