= Nemacerota =

Scientific classification
- Domain: Eukaryota
- Kingdom: Animalia
- Phylum: Arthropoda
- Class: Insecta
- Order: Lepidoptera
- Family: Drepanidae
- Subfamily: Thyatirinae
- Genus: Nemacerota; Hampson, 1893

Synonyms
- Togaria Matsumura, 1921; Microthyatira Werny, 1966

Moth genus in family Drepanidae

Nemacerota is a genus of moths belonging to the subfamily Thyatirinae of the Drepanidae. It was first described by George Hampson in 1893.

== Species ==
- Nemacerota bacsovi Laszlo, G. Ronkay, L. Ronkay & Witt, 2007
- Nemacerota cinerea (Warren, 1888)
- Nemacerota decorata (Sick, 1941)
- Nemacerota griseobasalis (Sick, 1941)
- Nemacerota igorkostjuki Laszlo, G. Ronkay, L. Ronkay & Witt, 2007
- Nemacerota inouei Laszlo, G. Ronkay, L. Ronkay & Witt, 2007
- Nemacerota lobbichleri Werny, 1966
- Nemacerota mandibulata Laszlo, G. Ronkay, L. Ronkay & Witt, 2007
- Nemacerota matsumurana Laszlo, G. Ronkay, L. Ronkay & Witt, 2007
- Nemacerota owadai Laszlo, G. Ronkay, L. Ronkay & Witt, 2007
- Nemacerota pectinata (Houlbert, 1921)
- Nemacerota sejilaa Pan et al., 2014
- Nemacerota speideli Saldaitis, Ivinskis & Borth, 2014
- Nemacerota stueningi Laszlo, G. Ronkay, L. Ronkay & Witt, 2007
- Nemacerota tancrei (Graeser, 1888)
- Nemacerota taurina Laszlo, G. Ronkay, L. Ronkay & Witt, 2007

== Former species ==
- Nemacerota alternata
