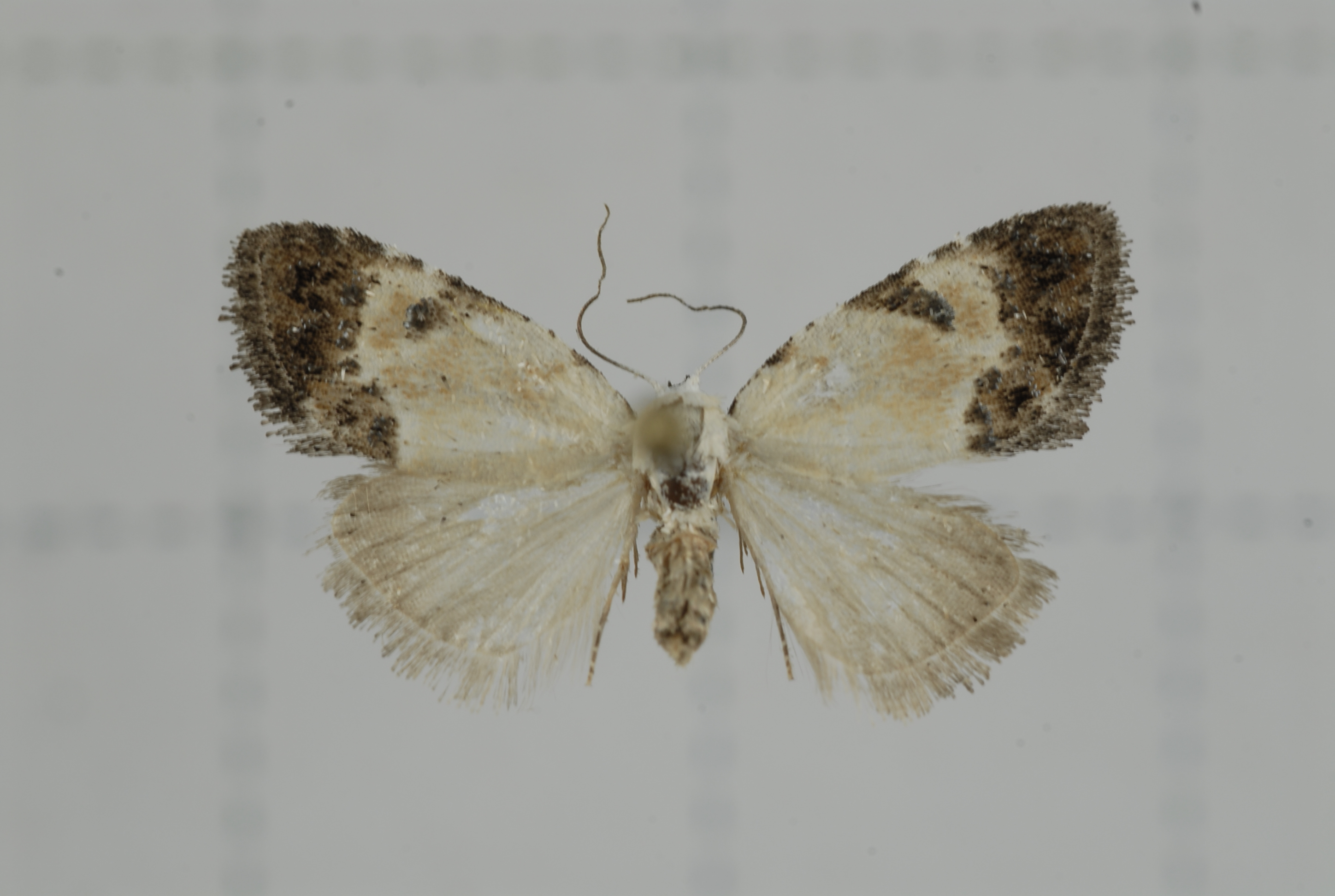
- Casminola yoshimotoi

Scientific classification
- Kingdom: Animalia
- Phylum: Arthropoda
- Clade: Pancrustacea
- Class: Insecta
- Order: Lepidoptera
- Superfamily: Noctuoidea
- Family: Nolidae
- Subfamily: Nolinae
- Genus: Casminola; László, G. Ronkay & Witt, 2010

= Casminola =

Genus of moths

Casminola is a genus of moths in the family Nolidae.

== Species ==
- Casminola arminbecheri László, G. Ronkay & Witt, 2010
- Casminola breviharpe László, G. Ronkay & Witt, 2010
- Casminola chionobasis (Hampson, 1901)
- Casminola johannstumpfi László, G. Ronkay & Witt, 2010
- Casminola pulchella (Leech, 1889)
- Casminola rubropicta László, G. Ronkay & Witt, 2010
- Casminola seminigra (Hampson, 1896)
- Casminola spinosa László, G. Ronkay & Witt, 2010
- Casminola splendida László, G. Ronkay & Witt, 2010
- Casminola subseminigra Y.Q. Hu, H.L. Han & M. Wang, 2013
- Casminola yoshimotoi (Inoue, 2000)
