= Manoba microphasma =

Scientific classification
- Kingdom: Animalia
- Phylum: Arthropoda
- Clade: Pancrustacea
- Class: Insecta
- Order: Lepidoptera
- Superfamily: Noctuoidea
- Family: Nolidae
- Genus: Manoba
- Species: M. microphasma

Binomial name
- Manoba microphasma (Butler, 1885)

Synonyms
- Nola microphasma Butler, 1885; Meganola microphasma

Species of moth

Manoba microphasma is a moth in the family Nolidae. It was described by Arthur Gardiner Butler in 1885. It is found in Japan.
