= Manoba chamberlaini =

Scientific classification
- Kingdom: Animalia
- Phylum: Arthropoda
- Clade: Pancrustacea
- Class: Insecta
- Order: Lepidoptera
- Superfamily: Noctuoidea
- Family: Nolidae
- Genus: Manoba
- Species: M. chamberlaini

Binomial name
- Manoba chamberlaini Holloway, 2003

Species of moth

Manoba chamberlaini is a moth in the family Nolidae. It was described by Jeremy Daniel Holloway in 2003. It is found on Borneo and in Thailand. The habitat consists of upper montane forests.

The length of the forewings is 6–7 mm. Adults are satiny white and grey.
