= Ctenane dealbata =

Scientific classification
- Kingdom: Animalia
- Phylum: Arthropoda
- Class: Insecta
- Order: Lepidoptera
- Superfamily: Noctuoidea
- Family: Nolidae
- Genus: Ctenane
- Species: C. dealbata

Binomial name
- Ctenane dealbata Wileman & West, 1928

Species of moth

Ctenane dealbata is a moth of the family Nolidae. It was described by Wileman and West. It is found on the Philippines.
