= Manoba tristicta =

Scientific classification
- Kingdom: Animalia
- Phylum: Arthropoda
- Clade: Pancrustacea
- Class: Insecta
- Order: Lepidoptera
- Superfamily: Noctuoidea
- Family: Nolidae
- Genus: Manoba
- Species: M. tristicta

Binomial name
- Manoba tristicta (Hampson, 1900)

Synonyms
- Nola tristicta Hampson, 1900

Species of moth

Manoba tristicta is a moth in the family Nolidae. It was described by George Hampson in 1900. It is found in India (Sikkim, Assam) and Thailand.
