= Manoba gilletti =

Scientific classification
- Kingdom: Animalia
- Phylum: Arthropoda
- Clade: Pancrustacea
- Class: Insecta
- Order: Lepidoptera
- Superfamily: Noctuoidea
- Family: Nolidae
- Genus: Manoba
- Species: M. gilletti

Binomial name
- Manoba gilletti Holloway, 2003

Species of moth

Manoba gilletti is a moth in the family Nolidae. It was described by Jeremy Daniel Holloway in 2003. It is found on Borneo. The habitat consists of mossy upper montane forests.

The length of the forewings is 7–8 mm for both males and females.
