= Nemacerota speideli =

Scientific classification
- Kingdom: Animalia
- Phylum: Arthropoda
- Clade: Pancrustacea
- Class: Insecta
- Order: Lepidoptera
- Family: Drepanidae
- Genus: Nemacerota
- Species: N. speideli

Binomial name
- Nemacerota speideli Saldaitis, Ivinskis & Borth, 2014

Species of false owlet moth

Nemacerota speideli is a moth in the family Drepanidae. It was described by Saldaitis, Ivinskis and Borth in 2014. It is found in China (Sichuan).

== Subspecies ==
- Nemacerota speideli speideli (China: Sichuan)
- Nemacerota speideli severa Saldaitis, Ivinskis & Borth, 2014 (China: Sichuan)
