= Nemacerota griseobasalis =

Scientific classification
- Domain: Eukaryota
- Kingdom: Animalia
- Phylum: Arthropoda
- Class: Insecta
- Order: Lepidoptera
- Family: Drepanidae
- Genus: Nemacerota
- Species: N. griseobasalis

Binomial name
- Nemacerota griseobasalis (Sick, 1941)

Synonyms
- Palimpsestis griseobasalis Sick, 1941

Species of false owlet moth

Nemacerota griseobasalis is a moth in the family Drepanidae. It was described by Sick in 1941. It is found in China (Yunnan).
