= Manoba grisealis =

Scientific classification
- Kingdom: Animalia
- Phylum: Arthropoda
- Clade: Pancrustacea
- Class: Insecta
- Order: Lepidoptera
- Superfamily: Noctuoidea
- Family: Nolidae
- Genus: Manoba
- Species: M. grisealis

Binomial name
- Manoba grisealis (C. Swinhoe, 1895)

Synonyms
- Rhynchopalpus grisealis C. Swinhoe, 1895

Species of moth

Manoba grisealis is a moth in the family Nolidae. It was described by Charles Swinhoe in 1895. It is found in the north-eastern Himalayas.
