= Manoba chirgwini =

Scientific classification
- Kingdom: Animalia
- Phylum: Arthropoda
- Clade: Pancrustacea
- Class: Insecta
- Order: Lepidoptera
- Superfamily: Noctuoidea
- Family: Nolidae
- Genus: Manoba
- Species: M. chirgwini

Binomial name
- Manoba chirgwini Holloway, 2003

Species of moth

Manoba chirgwini is a moth in the family Nolidae. It was described by Jeremy Daniel Holloway in 2003. It is found on Borneo. The habitat consists of upper montane forests.

The length of the forewings is about 7 mm.
