= Stictane filiformis =

Scientific classification
- Kingdom: Animalia
- Phylum: Arthropoda
- Clade: Pancrustacea
- Class: Insecta
- Order: Lepidoptera
- Superfamily: Noctuoidea
- Family: Erebidae
- Subfamily: Arctiinae
- Genus: Stictane
- Species: S. filiformis

Binomial name
- Stictane filiformis Holloway, 2001

Species of moth

Stictane filiformis is a moth in the family Erebidae. It was described by Jeremy Daniel Holloway in 2001. It is found on Borneo. The habitat consists of primary dipterocarp forests.

The length of the forewings is about 5 mm.
