= Manoba briggsi =

Scientific classification
- Kingdom: Animalia
- Phylum: Arthropoda
- Clade: Pancrustacea
- Class: Insecta
- Order: Lepidoptera
- Superfamily: Noctuoidea
- Family: Nolidae
- Genus: Manoba
- Species: M. briggsi

Binomial name
- Manoba briggsi Holloway, 2003

Species of moth

Manoba briggsi is a moth in the family Nolidae. It was described by Jeremy Daniel Holloway in 2003. It is found on Borneo.

The length of the forewings is about 6 mm.
