= Manoba subtribei =

Scientific classification
- Kingdom: Animalia
- Phylum: Arthropoda
- Clade: Pancrustacea
- Class: Insecta
- Order: Lepidoptera
- Superfamily: Noctuoidea
- Family: Nolidae
- Genus: Manoba
- Species: M. subtribei

Binomial name
- Manoba subtribei H.-L. Han & C.-D. Li, 2008

Species of moth

Manoba subtribei is a moth in the family Nolidae. It was described by Hui-Lin Han and Cheng-De Li in 2008. It is found in Yunnan, China.
