= Manoba lilliptiana =

Scientific classification
- Kingdom: Animalia
- Phylum: Arthropoda
- Clade: Pancrustacea
- Class: Insecta
- Order: Lepidoptera
- Superfamily: Noctuoidea
- Family: Nolidae
- Genus: Manoba
- Species: M. lilliptiana

Binomial name
- Manoba lilliptiana (Inoue, 1998)

Synonyms
- Rhynchopalpus lilliptiana Inoue, 1998

Species of moth

Manoba lilliptiana is a moth in the family Nolidae. It was described by Hiroshi Inoue in 1998. It is found in Nepal and Thailand (most studied specimens come from the Northern mountainous region).
