= Manoba izuensis =

Scientific classification
- Kingdom: Animalia
- Phylum: Arthropoda
- Clade: Pancrustacea
- Class: Insecta
- Order: Lepidoptera
- Superfamily: Noctuoidea
- Family: Nolidae
- Genus: Manoba
- Species: M. izuensis

Binomial name
- Manoba izuensis (Inoue, 1961)

Synonyms
- Nola izuensis Inoue, 1961; Meganola izuensis

Species of moth

Manoba izuensis is a moth in the family Nolidae. It was described by Hiroshi Inoue in 1961. It is found in Japan.
