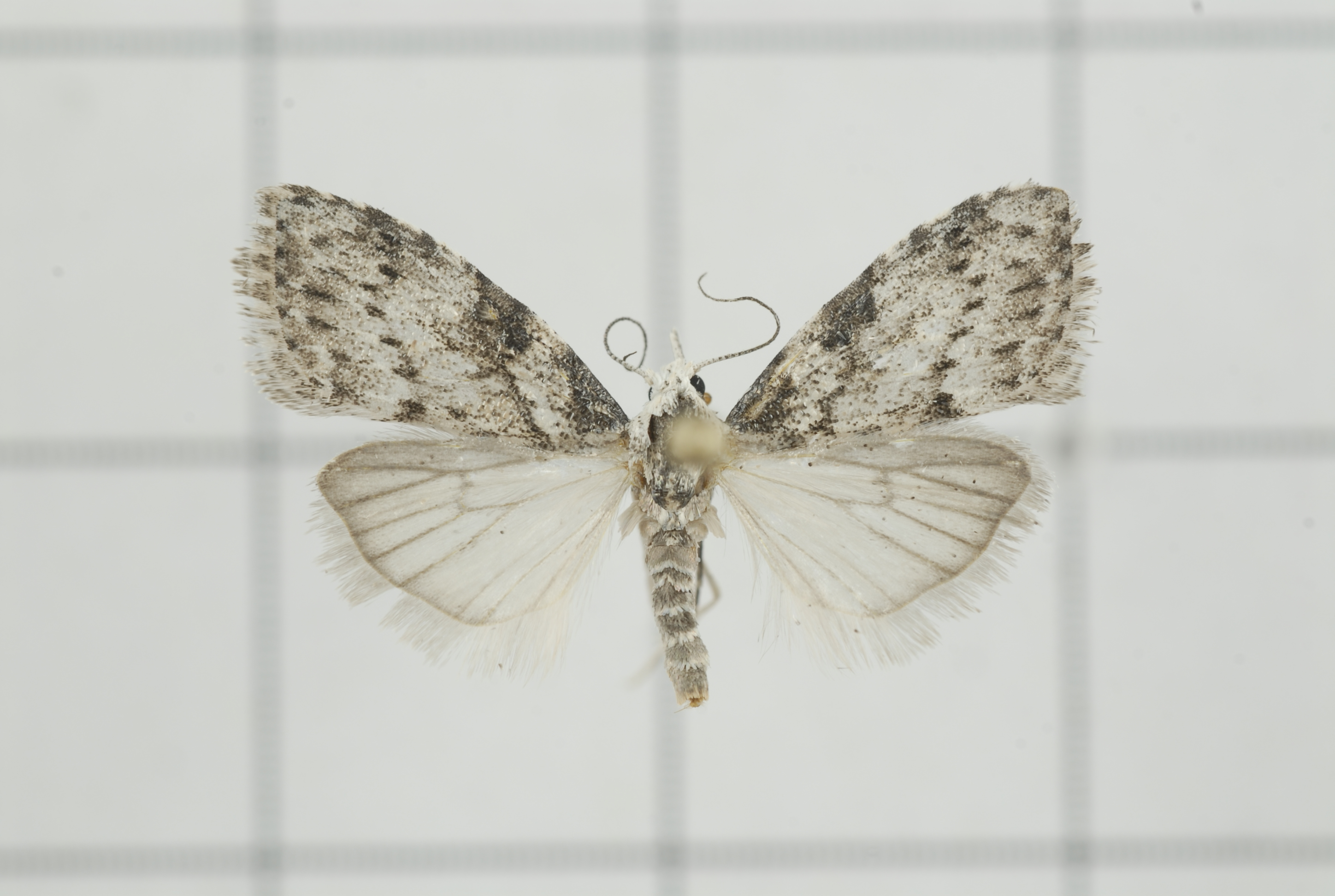

Scientific classification
- Kingdom: Animalia
- Phylum: Arthropoda
- Clade: Pancrustacea
- Class: Insecta
- Order: Lepidoptera
- Superfamily: Noctuoidea
- Family: Nolidae
- Genus: Manoba
- Species: M. phaeochroa

Binomial name
- Manoba phaeochroa (Hampson, 1900)

Synonyms
- Celama phaeogropha Hampson, 1900; Nola phaeochroa

= Manoba phaeochroa =

Species of moth

Manoba phaeochroa is a moth in the family Nolidae. It was described by George Hampson in 1900.

== Distribution ==
It is found in Sikkim in India and in Thailand and possibly on Java.
