= Manoba rennicki =

Scientific classification
- Kingdom: Animalia
- Phylum: Arthropoda
- Clade: Pancrustacea
- Class: Insecta
- Order: Lepidoptera
- Superfamily: Noctuoidea
- Family: Nolidae
- Genus: Manoba
- Species: M. rennicki

Binomial name
- Manoba rennicki Holloway, 2003

Species of moth

Manoba rennicki is a moth in the family Nolidae. It was described by Jeremy Daniel Holloway in 2003. It is found on Borneo. The habitat probably consists of hill dipterocarp forests.

The length of the forewings is about 6 mm.
