= Manoba postpuncta =

Scientific classification
- Kingdom: Animalia
- Phylum: Arthropoda
- Clade: Pancrustacea
- Class: Insecta
- Order: Lepidoptera
- Superfamily: Noctuoidea
- Family: Nolidae
- Genus: Manoba
- Species: M. postpuncta

Binomial name
- Manoba postpuncta Rothschild, 1913

Species of moth

Manoba postpuncta is a moth in the family Nolidae. It was described by Rothschild in 1913. It is found in New Guinea.
