= Stictane =

Scientific classification
- Kingdom: Animalia
- Phylum: Arthropoda
- Class: Insecta
- Order: Lepidoptera
- Superfamily: Noctuoidea
- Family: Erebidae
- Subfamily: Arctiinae
- Tribe: Lithosiini
- Genus: Stictane; Hampson, 1900

Synonyms
- Microtane Hampson, 1901

Genus of moths

Stictane is a genus of moths in the family Erebidae erected by George Hampson in 1900.

== Species ==
- Stictane bipunctulata (van Eecke, 1927)
- Stictane chinesica (Draudt, 1931)
- Stictane ciliata Holloway, 2001
- Stictane filiformis Holloway, 2001
- Stictane fractilinea (Snellen, 1880)
- Stictane fusca (Hampson, 1901)
- Stictane muara Holloway, 2001
- Stictane obliquilinea Hampson, 1900
- Stictane obscura (Inoue, 1976)
- Stictane parvipectinata Holloway, 2001
- Stictane pectinata Holloway, 2001
- Stictane rectilinea (Snellen, 1879)
- Stictane serrata Holloway, 2001
- Stictane taeniatus (Rothschild, 1916)
- Stictane umbrata (van Eecke, 1927)
