= Manoba argentalis =

Scientific classification
- Kingdom: Animalia
- Phylum: Arthropoda
- Clade: Pancrustacea
- Class: Insecta
- Order: Lepidoptera
- Superfamily: Noctuoidea
- Family: Nolidae
- Genus: Manoba
- Species: M. argentalis

Binomial name
- Manoba argentalis (Moore, 1867)

Synonyms
- Aglossa argentalis Moore, 1867; Nola argentalis

Species of moth

Manoba argentalis is a moth in the family Nolidae. It was described by Frederic Moore in 1867. It is found in Sikkim, India.

The larvae have been recorded feeding on Castanopsis indica.
