= Manoba implens =

Scientific classification
- Kingdom: Animalia
- Phylum: Arthropoda
- Clade: Pancrustacea
- Class: Insecta
- Order: Lepidoptera
- Superfamily: Noctuoidea
- Family: Nolidae
- Genus: Manoba
- Species: M. implens

Binomial name
- Manoba implens Walker, 1863

Synonyms
- Stictane junctilinea Hampson, 1901

Species of moth

Manoba implens is a moth in the family Nolidae. It was described by Francis Walker in 1863. It is found on Borneo, Peninsular Malaysia and the Philippines. The habitat consists of lowland and lower montane forests up to 1000 meters.
