= Manoba suffusata =

Scientific classification
- Kingdom: Animalia
- Phylum: Arthropoda
- Clade: Pancrustacea
- Class: Insecta
- Order: Lepidoptera
- Superfamily: Noctuoidea
- Family: Nolidae
- Genus: Manoba
- Species: M. suffusata

Binomial name
- Manoba suffusata (Wileman & West, 1929)

Synonyms
- Nola suffusata Wileman & West, 1929; Meganola suffusata (Wileman & West, 1929)

Species of moth

Manoba suffusata is a moth in the family Nolidae. It was described by Wileman and West in 1929. It is found in Taiwan, Thailand, Vietnam and Myanmar, as well as on Sumatra and Borneo. The habitat consists of alluvial forests, wet heath forests, lowland forests, gardens and secondary forests.
