= Nemacerota sejilaa =

Scientific classification
- Kingdom: Animalia
- Phylum: Arthropoda
- Clade: Pancrustacea
- Class: Insecta
- Order: Lepidoptera
- Family: Drepanidae
- Genus: Nemacerota
- Species: N. sejilaa

Binomial name
- Nemacerota sejilaa Pan, Ronkay, Ronkay & Han, 2014

Species of false owlet moth

Nemacerota sejilaa is a moth in the family Drepanidae. It was described by Zhao-Hui Pan, Gábor Ronkay, László Ronkay and Hui-Lin Han in 2014. It is found in Tibet, China.

The wingspan is 42–46 mm. Adults are on wing from late July to late August.

== Etymology ==
The species name refers to Mt. Sejila, the type locality.
