= Manoba paucilinea =

Scientific classification
- Kingdom: Animalia
- Phylum: Arthropoda
- Clade: Pancrustacea
- Class: Insecta
- Order: Lepidoptera
- Superfamily: Noctuoidea
- Family: Nolidae
- Genus: Manoba
- Species: M. paucilinea

Binomial name
- Manoba paucilinea de Joannis, 1928

Species of moth

Manoba paucilinea is a moth in the family Nolidae. It was described by Joseph de Joannis in 1928. It is found in Vietnam.
