= Manoba tribei =

Scientific classification
- Kingdom: Animalia
- Phylum: Arthropoda
- Clade: Pancrustacea
- Class: Insecta
- Order: Lepidoptera
- Superfamily: Noctuoidea
- Family: Nolidae
- Genus: Manoba
- Species: M. tribei

Binomial name
- Manoba tribei Holloway, 2003

Species of moth

Manoba tribei is a moth in the family Nolidae. It was described by Jeremy Daniel Holloway in 2003 and is found in Borneo.
