= Vandamia =

Scientific classification
- Domain: Eukaryota
- Kingdom: Animalia
- Phylum: Arthropoda
- Class: Insecta
- Order: Lepidoptera
- Superfamily: Noctuoidea
- Family: Nolidae
- Subfamily: Nolinae
- Genus: Vandamia van Son, 1933

Genus of moths

Vandamia is a genus of moths of the family Nolidae. The genus was erected by Georges van Son in 1933.

== Species ==
- Vandamia illaudata D. S. Fletcher, 1958
- Vandamia lightfooti (van Son, 1933)
- Vandamia mariepi van Son, 1933
- Vandamia typica van Son, 1933
