= Manoba melanomedia =

Scientific classification
- Kingdom: Animalia
- Phylum: Arthropoda
- Clade: Pancrustacea
- Class: Insecta
- Order: Lepidoptera
- Superfamily: Noctuoidea
- Family: Nolidae
- Genus: Manoba
- Species: M. melanomedia

Binomial name
- Manoba melanomedia (Inoue, 1991)

Synonyms
- Meganola melanomedia Inoue, 1991

Species of moth

Manoba melanomedia is a moth in the family Nolidae. It was described by Hiroshi Inoue in 1991. It is found on Borneo and in Taiwan and Thailand. The habitat consists of hill dipterocarp forests and lower montane forests and scrub on limestone.
