= Nemacerota pectinata =

Scientific classification
- Domain: Eukaryota
- Kingdom: Animalia
- Phylum: Arthropoda
- Class: Insecta
- Order: Lepidoptera
- Family: Drepanidae
- Genus: Nemacerota
- Species: N. pectinata

Binomial name
- Nemacerota pectinata (Houlbert, 1921)

Synonyms
- Palimpsestis pectinata Houlbert, 1921; Tethea pectinata

Species of false owlet moth

Nemacerota pectinata is a moth in the family Drepanidae. It was described by Constant Vincent Houlbert in 1921. It is found in the Chinese provinces of Shaanxi, Sichuan and Yunnan.
