= Manoba coadei =

Scientific classification
- Kingdom: Animalia
- Phylum: Arthropoda
- Clade: Pancrustacea
- Class: Insecta
- Order: Lepidoptera
- Superfamily: Noctuoidea
- Family: Nolidae
- Genus: Manoba
- Species: M. coadei

Binomial name
- Manoba coadei Holloway, 2003

Species of moth

Manoba coadei is a moth in the family Nolidae. It was described by Jeremy Daniel Holloway in 2003. It is found on Borneo. The habitat consists of lower and upper montane forests.

The length of the forewings is 8–9 mm for both males and females.
