= Manoba allani =

Scientific classification
- Kingdom: Animalia
- Phylum: Arthropoda
- Clade: Pancrustacea
- Class: Insecta
- Order: Lepidoptera
- Superfamily: Noctuoidea
- Family: Nolidae
- Genus: Manoba
- Species: M. allani

Binomial name
- Manoba allani Holloway, 2003

Species of moth

Manoba allani is a moth in the family Nolidae. It was described by Jeremy Daniel Holloway in 2003. It is found on Borneo. The habitat consists of upper montane forests.

The length of the forewings is 8–10 mm.
