= Stenopsestis =

Scientific classification
- Domain: Eukaryota
- Kingdom: Animalia
- Phylum: Arthropoda
- Class: Insecta
- Order: Lepidoptera
- Family: Drepanidae
- Subfamily: Thyatirinae
- Genus: Stenopsestis; Yoshimoto, 1983

Moth genus in family Drepanidae

Stenopsestis is a genus of moths belonging to the subfamily Thyatirinae of the Drepanidae. It was described by Yoshimoto in 1983.

== Species ==
- Stenopsestis alternata (Moore, 1881)
- Stenopsestis bruna Jiang, Yang, Xue & Han, 2015
