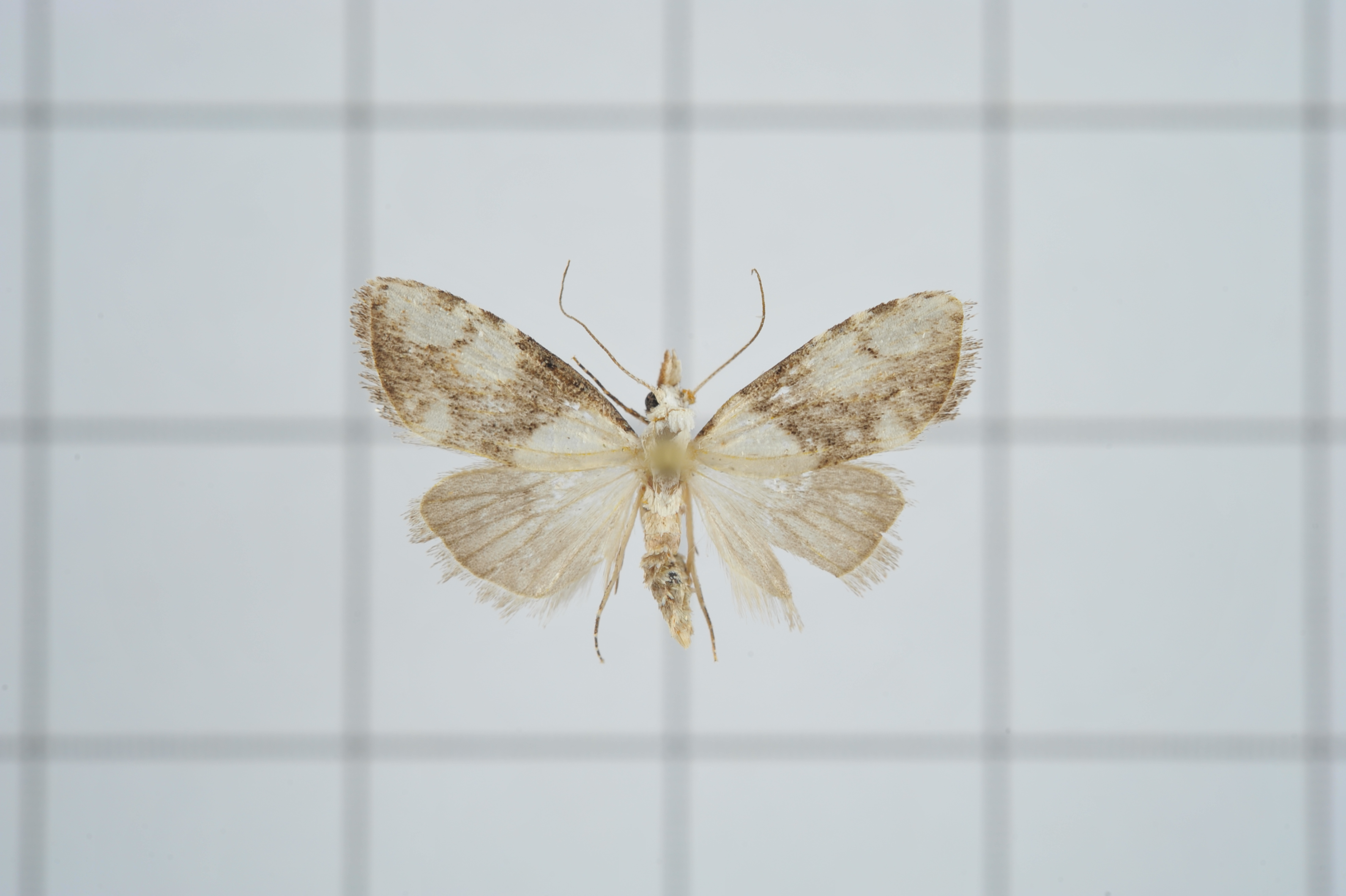

Scientific classification
- Kingdom: Animalia
- Phylum: Arthropoda
- Clade: Pancrustacea
- Class: Insecta
- Order: Lepidoptera
- Superfamily: Noctuoidea
- Family: Nolidae
- Genus: Manoba
- Species: M. tesselata

Binomial name
- Manoba tesselata (Hampson, 1896)

Synonyms
- Nola tesselata Hampson, 1896; Celama marmorea Talbot, 1926

= Manoba tesselata =

Species of moth

Manoba tesselata is a moth in the family Nolidae. It was described by George Hampson in 1896. It is found in Taiwan, as well as on Borneo, Sumatra, Java, Bali, Seram and the north-eastern Himalayas and in Thailand. The habitat consists of montane forests.
