= Manoba carrei =

Scientific classification
- Kingdom: Animalia
- Phylum: Arthropoda
- Clade: Pancrustacea
- Class: Insecta
- Order: Lepidoptera
- Superfamily: Noctuoidea
- Family: Nolidae
- Genus: Manoba
- Species: M. carrei

Binomial name
- Manoba carrei Holloway, 2003

Species of moth

Manoba carrei is a moth in the family Nolidae. It was described by Jeremy Daniel Holloway in 2003. It is found on Borneo. The habitat consists of montane forests, mostly on sandstone and shale.

The length of the forewings is 7–8 mm.
