= Stictane pectinata =

Scientific classification
- Kingdom: Animalia
- Phylum: Arthropoda
- Clade: Pancrustacea
- Class: Insecta
- Order: Lepidoptera
- Superfamily: Noctuoidea
- Family: Erebidae
- Subfamily: Arctiinae
- Genus: Stictane
- Species: S. pectinata

Binomial name
- Stictane pectinata Holloway, 2001

Species of moth

Stictane pectinata is a moth in the family Erebidae. It was described by Jeremy Daniel Holloway in 2001. It is found on Borneo. Its habitat consists of lower montane forests.

The length of the forewings is about 5 mm.
