= Manoba shrimptoni =

Scientific classification
- Kingdom: Animalia
- Phylum: Arthropoda
- Clade: Pancrustacea
- Class: Insecta
- Order: Lepidoptera
- Superfamily: Noctuoidea
- Family: Nolidae
- Genus: Manoba
- Species: M. shrimptoni

Binomial name
- Manoba shrimptoni Holloway, 2003

Species of moth

Manoba shrimptoni is a moth in the family Nolidae. It was described by Jeremy Daniel Holloway in 2003. It is found on Borneo. The habitat consists of montane areas.

The length of the forewings is 9 mm (0.35 in) for males and 10 mm (0.39 in) for females.
