= Manoba bulli =

Scientific classification
- Kingdom: Animalia
- Phylum: Arthropoda
- Clade: Pancrustacea
- Class: Insecta
- Order: Lepidoptera
- Superfamily: Noctuoidea
- Family: Nolidae
- Genus: Manoba
- Species: M. bulli

Binomial name
- Manoba bulli Holloway, 2003

Species of moth

Manoba bulli is a moth in the family Nolidae. It was described by Jeremy Daniel Holloway in 2003. It is found on Borneo. The habitat consists of upper montane forests and scrub.

The length of the forewings is 6–7 mm.
