= Manoba jinghongensis =

Scientific classification
- Kingdom: Animalia
- Phylum: Arthropoda
- Clade: Pancrustacea
- Class: Insecta
- Order: Lepidoptera
- Superfamily: Noctuoidea
- Family: Nolidae
- Genus: Manoba
- Species: M. jinghongensis

Binomial name
- Manoba jinghongensis T.-Y. Shao, C.D. Li & H.L. Han, 2009

Species of moth

Manoba jinghongensis is a moth in the family Nolidae. It was described by Tian-Yu Shao, Cheng-De Li and Hui-Lin Han in 2009. It is found in Yunnan, China.
