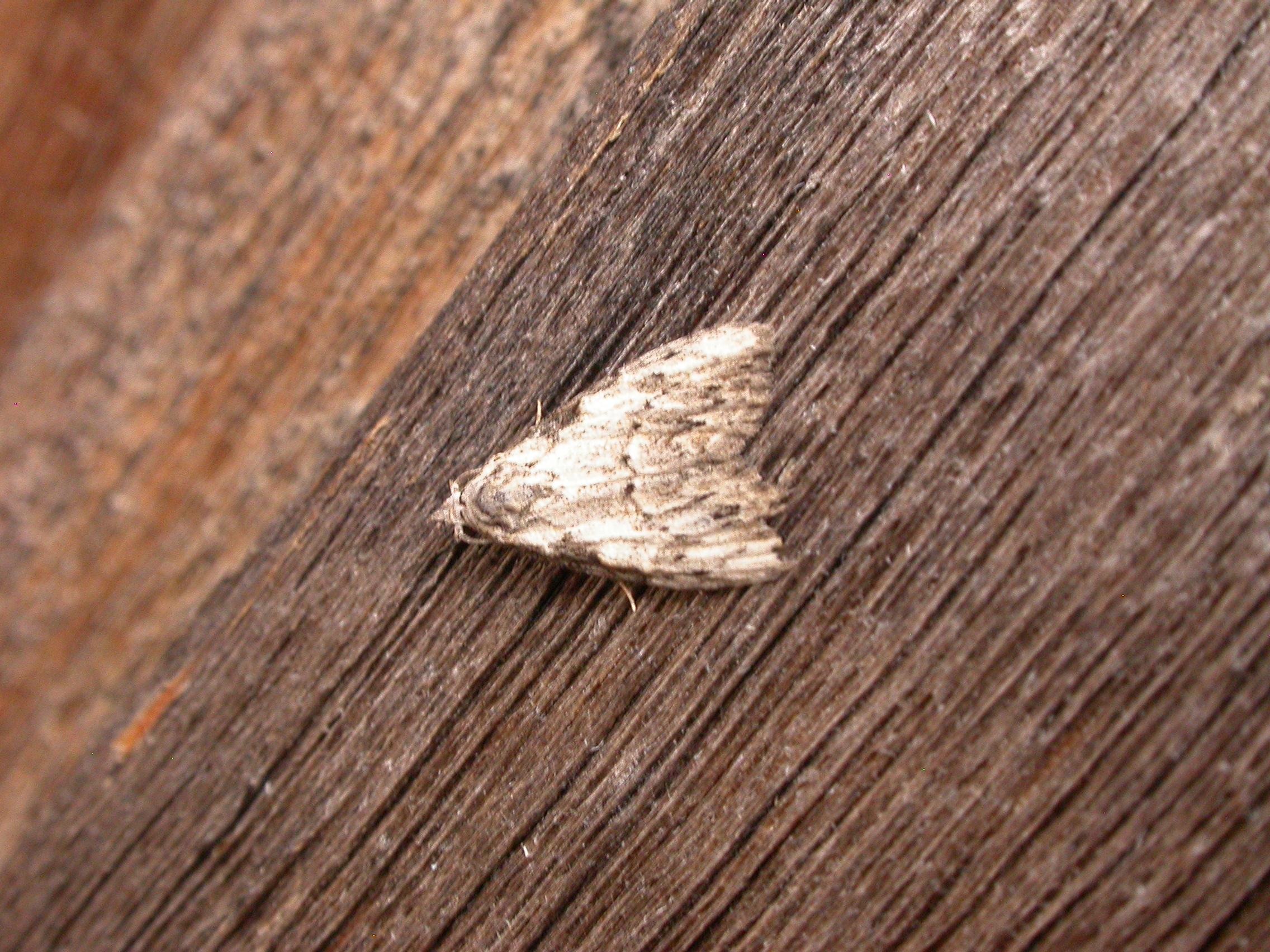

Scientific classification
- Kingdom: Animalia
- Phylum: Arthropoda
- Clade: Pancrustacea
- Class: Insecta
- Order: Lepidoptera
- Superfamily: Noctuoidea
- Family: Nolidae
- Genus: Manoba
- Species: M. major

Binomial name
- Manoba major (Hampson, 1891)

Synonyms
- Nola major Hampson, 1891; Meganola major; Nola formosana Wileman & West, 1929 (preocc. Wileman & West, 1928); Celama subpallida Turner, 1944; Meganola major caesiopennis Inoue, 1982; Meganola major takasago Inoue, 1982

= Manoba major =

Species of moth

Manoba major is a moth in the family Nolidae. It was described by George Hampson in 1891. It is found in India, Taiwan, Japan (the Ryukyu Islands), Myanmar, Singapore, as well as on Borneo, Java, Vanuatu and New Caledonia. Its habitat is coastal areas near mangroves.
