= Manoba terminalis =

Scientific classification
- Kingdom: Animalia
- Phylum: Arthropoda
- Clade: Pancrustacea
- Class: Insecta
- Order: Lepidoptera
- Superfamily: Noctuoidea
- Family: Nolidae
- Genus: Manoba
- Species: M. terminalis

Binomial name
- Manoba terminalis Rothschild, 1912

Species of moth

Manoba terminalis is a moth in the family Nolidae. It was described by Rothschild in 1912. It is found in New Guinea.
