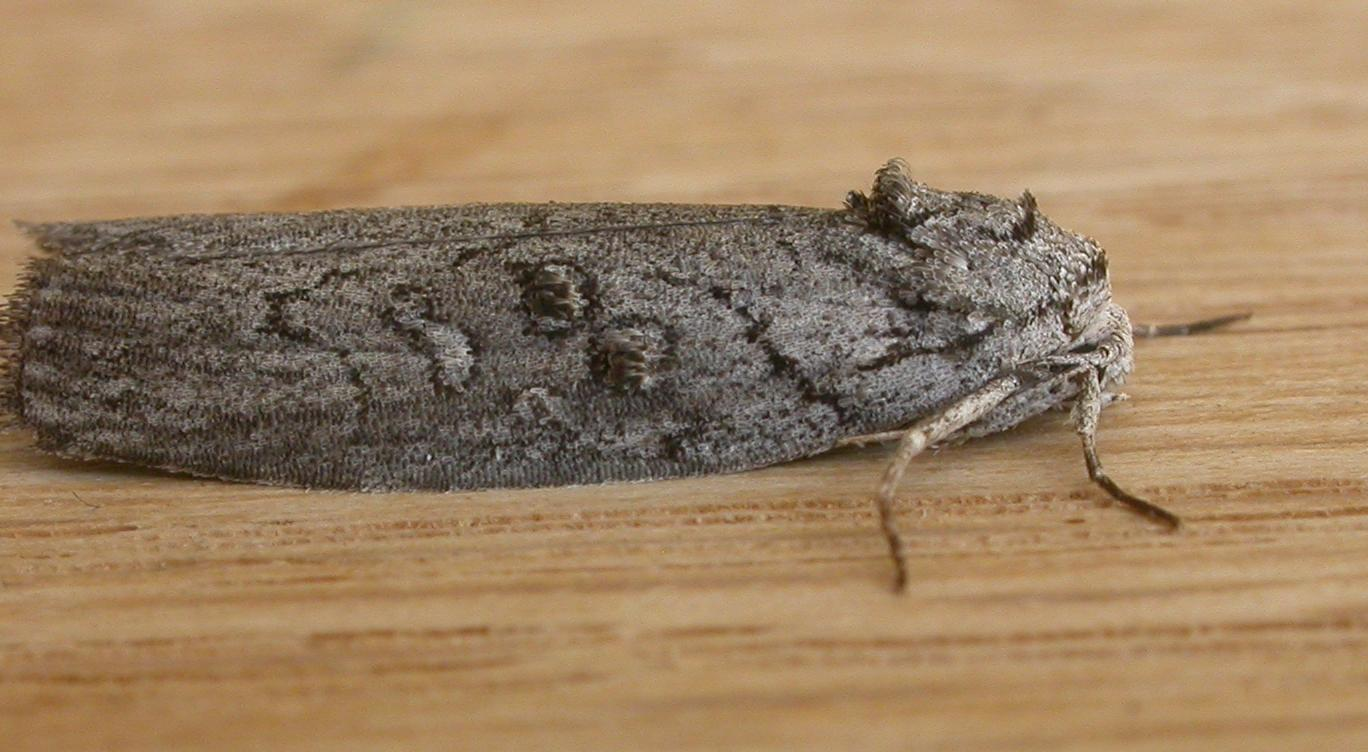

Scientific classification
- Kingdom: Animalia
- Phylum: Arthropoda
- Clade: Pancrustacea
- Class: Insecta
- Order: Lepidoptera
- Superfamily: Noctuoidea
- Family: Nolidae
- Subfamily: Nolinae
- Genus: Elesma; Walker, 1865
- Species: E. subglauca

Binomial name
- Elesma subglauca Walker, 1865

Synonyms
- Amaloptila triorbis Turner, 1903; Metaptila ptilomela Lower, 1900; Spathoptila cyclophora Turner, 1944

= Elesma =

Genus of moths

Elesma subglauca, the grey elesma, is a moth of the family Nolidae first described by Francis Walker in 1865. It is the only species in the genus Elesma. It is found in the southern half of Australia.

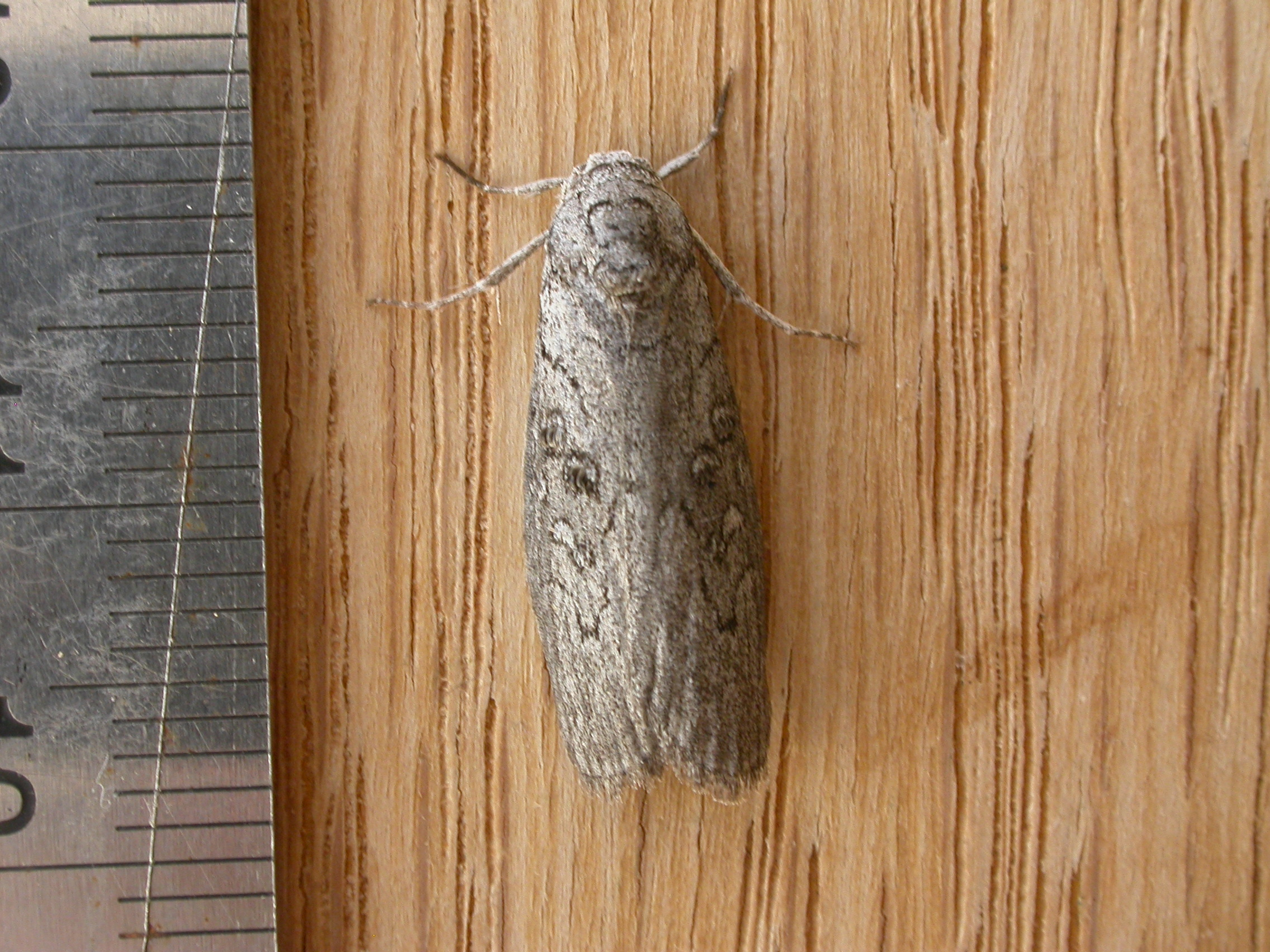

The wingspan is about 40 mm.
