= Manoba punctilineata =

Scientific classification
- Kingdom: Animalia
- Phylum: Arthropoda
- Clade: Pancrustacea
- Class: Insecta
- Order: Lepidoptera
- Superfamily: Noctuoidea
- Family: Nolidae
- Genus: Manoba
- Species: M. punctilineata

Binomial name
- Manoba punctilineata (Hampson, 1896)

Synonyms
- Nola punctilineata Hampson, 1896

Species of moth

Manoba punctilineata is a moth in the family Nolidae. It was described by George Hampson in 1896. It is found in the north-eastern Himalayas and Myanmar, as well as on Borneo, the Philippines and Sulawesi.
