= Stictane chinesica =

Scientific classification
- Domain: Eukaryota
- Kingdom: Animalia
- Phylum: Arthropoda
- Class: Insecta
- Order: Lepidoptera
- Superfamily: Noctuoidea
- Family: Erebidae
- Subfamily: Arctiinae
- Genus: Stictane
- Species: S. chinesica

Binomial name
- Stictane chinesica (Draudt, 1931)

Synonyms
- Stictane rectilinea ab. 1: Hampson, 1900; Stictane rectilinea ab. chinesica Strand, 1922; Manoba rectilinea f. chinesica Draudt, 1931; Manoba rectilinea chinesica Inoue, 1976

Species of moth

Stictane chinesica is a moth in the family Erebidae. It was described by Max Wilhelm Karl Draudt in 1931. It is found in China.
