= Manoba javanica =

Scientific classification
- Kingdom: Animalia
- Phylum: Arthropoda
- Clade: Pancrustacea
- Class: Insecta
- Order: Lepidoptera
- Superfamily: Noctuoidea
- Family: Nolidae
- Genus: Manoba
- Species: M. javanica

Binomial name
- Manoba javanica (van Eecke, 1920)

Synonyms
- Nola melanota javanica van Eecke, 1920

Species of moth

Manoba javanica is a moth in the family Nolidae. It was described by van Eecke in 1920. It is found on Java.
