= Cotesia urabae =

Scientific classification
- Kingdom: Animalia
- Phylum: Arthropoda
- Clade: Pancrustacea
- Class: Insecta
- Order: Hymenoptera
- Family: Braconidae
- Genus: Cotesia
- Species: C. urabae

Binomial name
- Cotesia urabae Austin & Allen, 1989

Species of wasp

Cotesia urabae is a small (2.5–3.2 mm long) wasp, having a black body with yellow-brown legs, characterized by a solitary larval endoparasitoid stage (Austin and Allen, 1989). It is part of a large complex of 11 primary parasitoids of Uraba lugens Walker, many of which are polyphagous (Allen, 1990a, 1990b). The female inserts its ovipositor into a U. lugens larva, depositing its eggs there, and it has been found that one female may carry up to 400 eggs (Allen, 1989). While C. urabae females are able to attack the same larva several times; only one single parasitoid completes its development in each larva (Berndt, 2010).

Once the C. urabae larvae emerges from the host larvae, a tightly woven sulphur-yellow pupal cocoon in a loose surrounding silk matrix is spun by C. urabae to pupate alongside the host (Allen, 1990a). There is considerable variation in the time that the larval stage spends developing inside the host, and it ranges between 14 days in summer and 20 days in winter.

"The adults emergence" takes place after 8 days of pupation, when a cap is cut and pushed off at the end of the cocoons allowing the adult to emerge and disperse. The adult lives for approximately 27 days (Allen, 1990b). It has been described that C. urabae has 2 generations within each generation of its host U. lugens, and no overlapping of adults of each C. urabae generation has been observed in the field (Allen, 1990a).

Cotesia urabae was introduced in New Zealand in 2011 as a biological control agent against the eucalyptus pest Uraba lugens, commonly known as the gum leaf skeletoniser (Avila et al. 2013). The biological control of the gum leaf skeletonizer is a novel biocontrol program, being the first attempt at control of this invasive moth in New Zealand. It has been predicted that C. urabae will lead to a considerable decrease on the existing population of U. lugens, along with providing several social and economic benefits (Avila et al. 2013).
