= Stictane serrata =

Scientific classification
- Kingdom: Animalia
- Phylum: Arthropoda
- Clade: Pancrustacea
- Class: Insecta
- Order: Lepidoptera
- Superfamily: Noctuoidea
- Family: Erebidae
- Subfamily: Arctiinae
- Genus: Stictane
- Species: S. serrata

Binomial name
- Stictane serrata Holloway, 2001

Species of moth

Stictane serrata is a moth in the family Erebidae. It was described by Jeremy Daniel Holloway in 2001. It is found on Borneo. The habitat consists of lowland heath forests, dipterocarp forests and lower montane forests.

The length of the forewings is 5–6 mm.
