= Nemacerota lobbichleri =

Scientific classification
- Domain: Eukaryota
- Kingdom: Animalia
- Phylum: Arthropoda
- Class: Insecta
- Order: Lepidoptera
- Family: Drepanidae
- Genus: Nemacerota
- Species: N. lobbichleri

Binomial name
- Nemacerota lobbichleri Werny, 1966

Species of false owlet moth

Nemacerota lobbichleri is a moth in the family Drepanidae. It was described by Werny in 1966. It is found in Pakistan.
