= Manoba harthani =

Scientific classification
- Kingdom: Animalia
- Phylum: Arthropoda
- Clade: Pancrustacea
- Class: Insecta
- Order: Lepidoptera
- Superfamily: Noctuoidea
- Family: Nolidae
- Genus: Manoba
- Species: M. harthani

Binomial name
- Manoba harthani (Holloway, 1976)

Synonyms
- Nola harthani Holloway, 1976

Species of moth

Manoba harthani is a moth in the family Nolidae. It was described by Jeremy Daniel Holloway in 1976. It is found on Borneo.
