= Manoba argentaloides =

Scientific classification
- Kingdom: Animalia
- Phylum: Arthropoda
- Clade: Pancrustacea
- Class: Insecta
- Order: Lepidoptera
- Superfamily: Noctuoidea
- Family: Nolidae
- Genus: Manoba
- Species: M. argentaloides

Binomial name
- Manoba argentaloides Holloway, 2003

Species of moth

Manoba argentaloides is a moth in the family Nolidae. It was described by Jeremy Daniel Holloway in 2003. It is found on Borneo and possibly Seram. The habitat consists of upper montane forests.

The length of the forewings is 9–13 mm for males and 11–14 mm for females.

The larvae possibly feed on Castanopsis and/or Quercus species.
