= Stictane ciliata =

Scientific classification
- Kingdom: Animalia
- Phylum: Arthropoda
- Clade: Pancrustacea
- Class: Insecta
- Order: Lepidoptera
- Superfamily: Noctuoidea
- Family: Erebidae
- Subfamily: Arctiinae
- Genus: Stictane
- Species: S. ciliata

Binomial name
- Stictane ciliata Holloway, 2001

Species of moth

Stictane ciliata is a moth in the family Erebidae. It was described by Jeremy Daniel Holloway in 2001. It is found on Borneo. The habitat consists of lowland forests and disturbed coastal forests.

The length of the forewings is 6 mm for males and 5 mm for females.
