= Manoba fasciatus =

Scientific classification
- Kingdom: Animalia
- Phylum: Arthropoda
- Clade: Pancrustacea
- Class: Insecta
- Order: Lepidoptera
- Superfamily: Noctuoidea
- Family: Nolidae
- Genus: Manoba
- Species: M. fasciatus

Binomial name
- Manoba fasciatus (Hampson, 1894)

Synonyms
- Rhynchopalpus fasciatus Hampson, 1894; Celama encausta Hampson, 1900; Nola fasciatoides Poole, 1989

Species of moth

Manoba fasciatus is a moth in the family Nolidae. It was described by George Hampson in 1894. It is found in the Indian states of Sikkim and Assam, and in Thailand and Japan.
