= Manoba sumatrana =

Scientific classification
- Kingdom: Animalia
- Phylum: Arthropoda
- Clade: Pancrustacea
- Class: Insecta
- Order: Lepidoptera
- Superfamily: Noctuoidea
- Family: Nolidae
- Genus: Manoba
- Species: M. sumatrana

Binomial name
- Manoba sumatrana (Roepke, 1948)

Synonyms
- Celama sumatrana Roepke, 1948 (preocc. van Eecke, 1926); Nola sumatranoides Poole, 1989

Species of moth

Manoba sumatrana is a moth in the family Nolidae. It was described by Walter Karl Johann Roepke in 1948. It is found on Sumatra.
