= Stictane fusca =

Scientific classification
- Kingdom: Animalia
- Phylum: Arthropoda
- Class: Insecta
- Order: Lepidoptera
- Superfamily: Noctuoidea
- Family: Erebidae
- Subfamily: Arctiinae
- Genus: Stictane
- Species: S. fusca

Binomial name
- Stictane fusca (Hampson, 1901)

Synonyms
- Microtane fusca Hampson, 1901

Species of moth

Stictane fusca is a moth in the family Erebidae. It was described by George Hampson in 1901. It is found in Sri Lanka.
