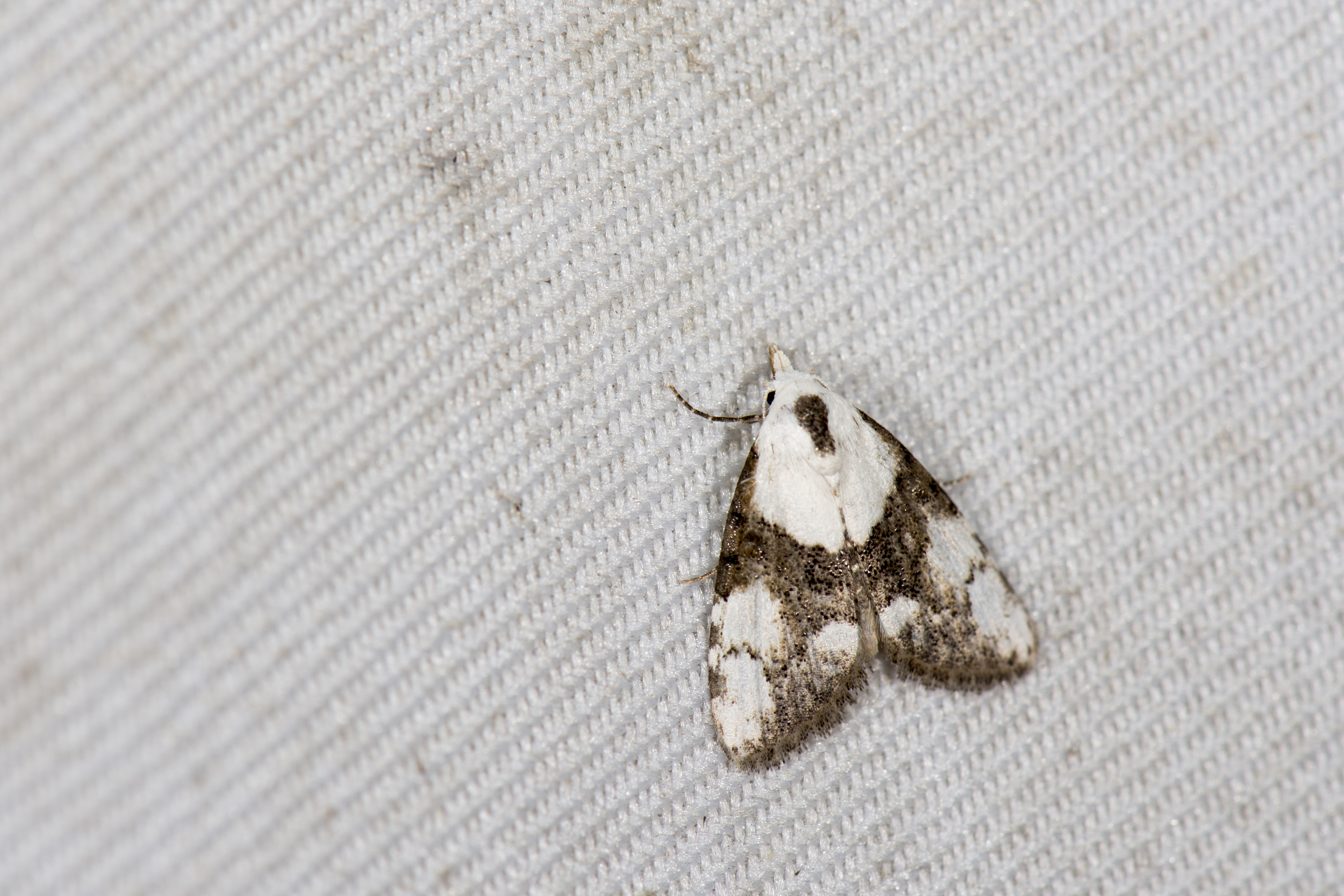

Scientific classification
- Kingdom: Animalia
- Phylum: Arthropoda
- Clade: Pancrustacea
- Class: Insecta
- Order: Lepidoptera
- Superfamily: Noctuoidea
- Family: Nolidae
- Genus: Manoba
- Species: M. lativittata

Binomial name
- Manoba lativittata (Moore, 1888)

Synonyms
- Roeselia lativittata Moore, 1888; Nola lativittata

= Manoba lativittata =

Species of moth

Manoba lativittata is a moth in the family Nolidae. It was described by Frederic Moore in 1888. It is found in Sikkim state of India and in Thailand.
