= Nemacerota decorata =

Scientific classification
- Domain: Eukaryota
- Kingdom: Animalia
- Phylum: Arthropoda
- Class: Insecta
- Order: Lepidoptera
- Family: Drepanidae
- Genus: Nemacerota
- Species: N. decorata

Binomial name
- Nemacerota decorata (Sick, 1941)

Synonyms
- Polyploca decorata Sick, 1941; Microthyatira decorata Sick, 1941

Species of false owlet moth

Nemacerota decorata is a moth in the family Drepanidae. It was described by Sick in 1941. It is found in the Chinese provinces of Yunnan and Sichuan.
