= Stictane muara =

Scientific classification
- Kingdom: Animalia
- Phylum: Arthropoda
- Clade: Pancrustacea
- Class: Insecta
- Order: Lepidoptera
- Superfamily: Noctuoidea
- Family: Erebidae
- Subfamily: Arctiinae
- Genus: Stictane
- Species: S. muara

Binomial name
- Stictane muara Holloway, 2001

Species of moth

Stictane muara is a moth in the family Erebidae. It was described by Jeremy Daniel Holloway in 2001. It is found on Borneo. The habitat consists of mangrove forests along the coast and primary forests.

The length of the forewings is about 5 mm for both males and females.
