= Manoba poecila =

Scientific classification
- Kingdom: Animalia
- Phylum: Arthropoda
- Clade: Pancrustacea
- Class: Insecta
- Order: Lepidoptera
- Superfamily: Noctuoidea
- Family: Nolidae
- Genus: Manoba
- Species: M. poecila

Binomial name
- Manoba poecila (Wileman & West, 1928)

Synonyms
- Celama poecila Wileman & West, 1928

Species of moth

Manoba poecila is a moth in the family Nolidae. It was described by Wileman and West in 1928. It is found in the Philippines.
