= Ctenane labuana =

Scientific classification
- Kingdom: Animalia
- Phylum: Arthropoda
- Class: Insecta
- Order: Lepidoptera
- Superfamily: Noctuoidea
- Family: Nolidae
- Genus: Ctenane
- Species: C. labuana

Binomial name
- Ctenane labuana (C. Swinhoe, 1904)

Synonyms
- Agrophila labuana C. Swinhoe, 1904

Species of moth

Ctenane labuana is a moth of the family Nolidae. It was described by Charles Swinhoe in 1904. It is found on Borneo. Its habitat consists of riverine forests, dipterocarp forests and alluvial forests.

== Etymology ==
The species name refers to the type location, the island of Labuan.
