= Aquita acontioides =

Scientific classification
- Kingdom: Animalia
- Phylum: Arthropoda
- Clade: Pancrustacea
- Class: Insecta
- Order: Lepidoptera
- Superfamily: Noctuoidea
- Family: Nolidae
- Genus: Aquita
- Species: A. acontioides

Binomial name
- Aquita acontioides (Walker, 1862)

Synonyms
- Zia acontioides (Walker, 1862); Pisara acontioides Walker, 1862

Species of moth

Aquita acontioides is an Asian member of the family Nolidae.

== Description ==
Palpi porrect (extending forward), thickly scales and of moderate length. Antennae fasciculated in male. Mid tibia with single spur pair and hind tibia with two spur pairs. Forewings with vein 3 from before end of cell, veins 4 and 5 from the end of cell, vein 6 present, and veins 7 to 9 stalked. Hindwings with vein 3, 4 stalked, vein 5 from angle of cell, veins 6 and 7 from upper angle and vein 8 from middle of cell.

Its wingspan is 18 mm. In the female, the head and thorax are pure white and the abdomen is pale fuscous. Forewings are pure white with a large fuscous patch on the basal half of the costa. A dark postmedial curved line present and the area beyond it is fuscous except at apex. Tufts of opalescent scales on the basal patch, at and beyond the end of cell, on the postmedial line and marginal fuscous area. Hindwings are white with fuscous outer area.
