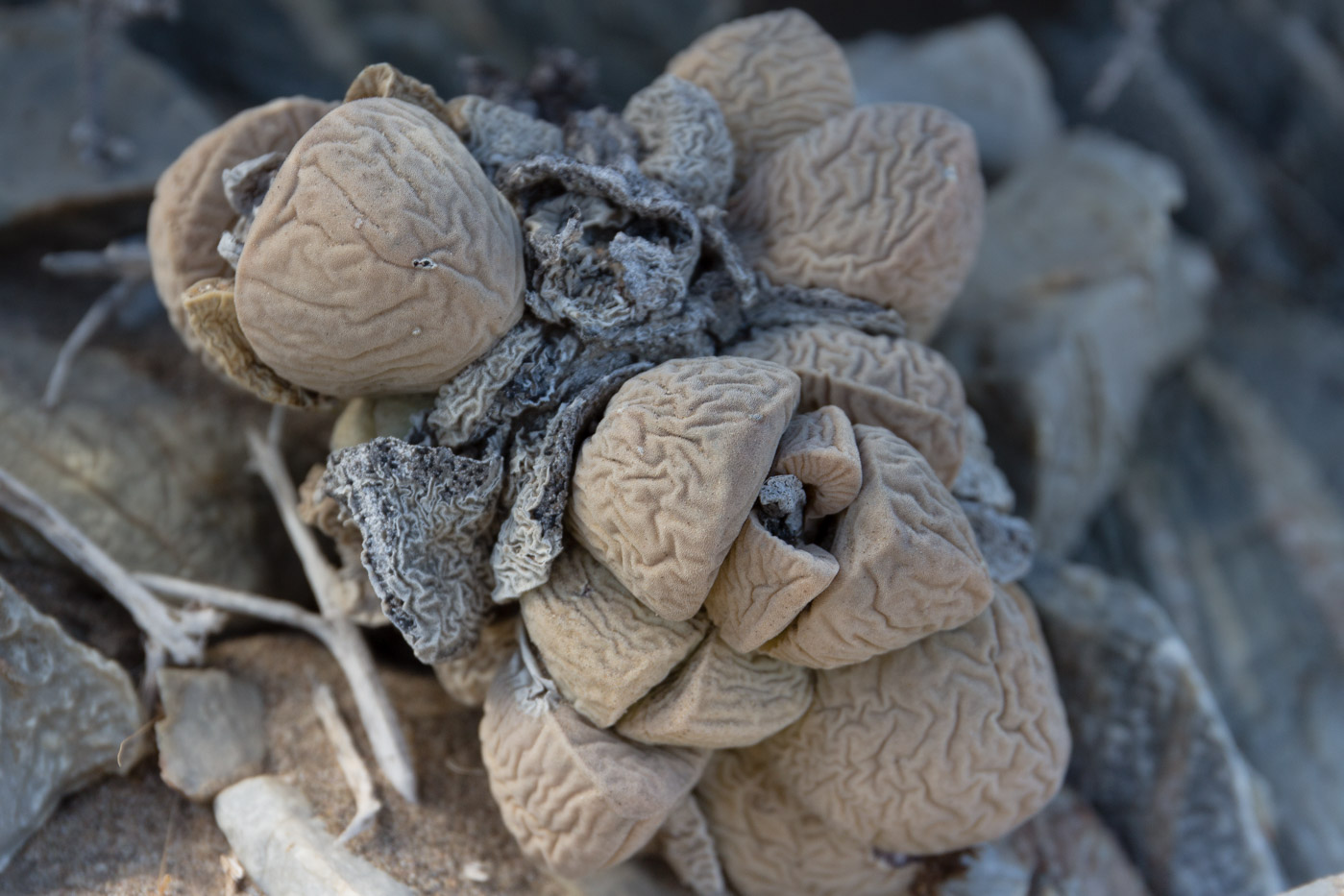

Scientific classification
- Kingdom: Plantae
- Clade: Tracheophytes
- Clade: Angiosperms
- Clade: Eudicots
- Order: Caryophyllales
- Family: Aizoaceae
- Tribe: Ruschieae
- Genus: Namibia (Schwantes) Dinter & Schwantes (1926)

Species
- Namibia cinerea (Marloth) Dinter & Schwantes; Namibia pomonae (Dinter) Dinter & Schwantes ex Walgate

= Namibia (plant) =

Genus of flowering plants

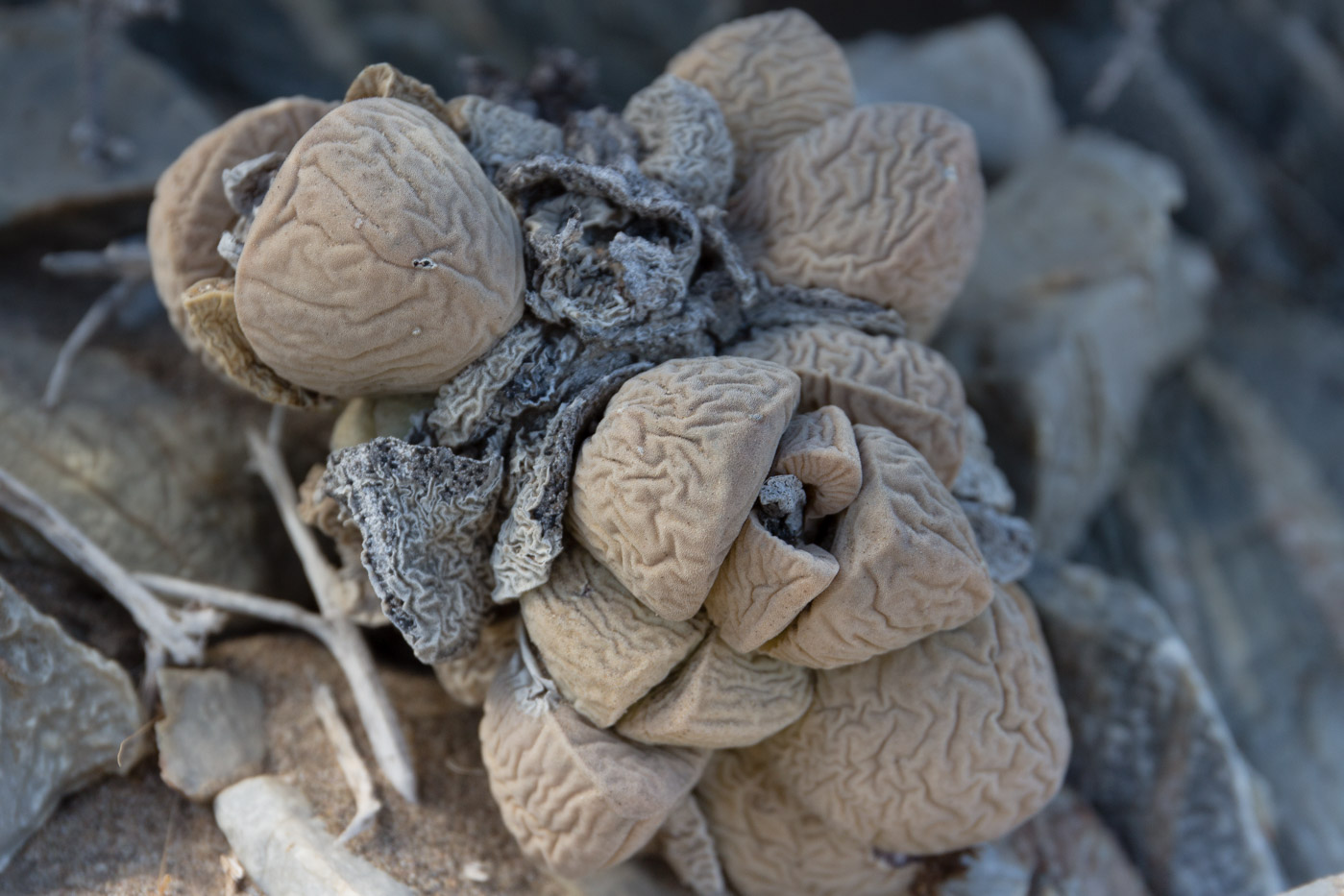
Namibia cinerea

Namibia is a genus of flowering plants in the family Aizoaceae. It includes two species of succulent subshrubs endemic to Namibia.

- Namibia cinerea (Marloth) Dinter & Schwantes
- Namibia pomonae (Dinter) Dinter & Schwantes ex Walgate
