= Manoba greenwoodi =

Scientific classification
- Kingdom: Animalia
- Phylum: Arthropoda
- Clade: Pancrustacea
- Class: Insecta
- Order: Lepidoptera
- Superfamily: Noctuoidea
- Family: Nolidae
- Genus: Manoba
- Species: M. greenwoodi

Binomial name
- Manoba greenwoodi Holloway, 2003

Species of moth

Manoba greenwoodi is a moth in the family Nolidae. It was described by Jeremy Daniel Holloway in 2003. It is found on Borneo. The habitat consists of hill dipterocarp forests.

The length of the forewings is about 7 mm.
