= Manoba costimaculata =

Scientific classification
- Kingdom: Animalia
- Phylum: Arthropoda
- Clade: Pancrustacea
- Class: Insecta
- Order: Lepidoptera
- Superfamily: Noctuoidea
- Family: Nolidae
- Genus: Manoba
- Species: M. costimaculata

Binomial name
- Manoba costimaculata Kiriakoff, 1958

Species of moth

Manoba costimaculata is a moth in the family Nolidae. It was described by Sergius G. Kiriakoff in 1958. It is found in Uganda.
