= Manoba marshalli =

Scientific classification
- Kingdom: Animalia
- Phylum: Arthropoda
- Clade: Pancrustacea
- Class: Insecta
- Order: Lepidoptera
- Superfamily: Noctuoidea
- Family: Nolidae
- Genus: Manoba
- Species: M. marshalli

Binomial name
- Manoba marshalli Holloway, 2003

Species of moth

Manoba marshalli is a moth in the family Nolidae. It was described by Jeremy Daniel Holloway in 2003. It is found on Borneo. The habitat consists of upper montane forests, mostly on limestone.

The length of the forewings is 8–9 mm.
