= Ctenane =

Scientific classification
- Domain: Eukaryota
- Kingdom: Animalia
- Phylum: Arthropoda
- Class: Insecta
- Order: Lepidoptera
- Superfamily: Noctuoidea
- Family: Nolidae
- Subfamily: Nolinae
- Genus: Ctenane; Swinhoe, 1905

Genus of moths

Ctenane is a genus of moths of the family Nolidae described by Charles Swinhoe in 1905. The genus was previously included in the subfamily Lithosiinae.

== Species ==
- Ctenane dealbata (Wileman & West)
- Ctenane labuana (Swinhoe, 1904) Assam, China (Hainan), Sumatra, Borneo, Philippines
- Ctenane michaeli László, Ronkay & Ronkay, 2015 Sumatra
- Ctenane trianguloquelinea (van Eecke, 1920) Java, Sumatra, Borneo, northern Thailand
- Ctenane yanguinghui (László, Ronkay & Ronkay, 2014) Taiwan
