= Stenopsestis bruna =

Scientific classification
- Domain: Eukaryota
- Kingdom: Animalia
- Phylum: Arthropoda
- Class: Insecta
- Order: Lepidoptera
- Family: Drepanidae
- Genus: Stenopsestis
- Species: S. bruna

Binomial name
- Stenopsestis bruna Jiang, Yang, Xue & Han, 2015

Species of false owlet moth

Stenopsestis bruna is a moth in the family Drepanidae. It was described by Nan Jiang, Chao Yang, Dayong Xue, Hongxiang Han in 2015. It is found in the Chinese provinces of Hubei and Hunan.

The length of the forewings is 20–21 mm.

== Etymology ==
The species name refers to the dark brown colour of the wings and is derived from Latin brunus (meaning brown).
