= Manoba cowleyi =

Scientific classification
- Kingdom: Animalia
- Phylum: Arthropoda
- Clade: Pancrustacea
- Class: Insecta
- Order: Lepidoptera
- Superfamily: Noctuoidea
- Family: Nolidae
- Genus: Manoba
- Species: M. cowleyi

Binomial name
- Manoba cowleyi Holloway, 2003

Species of moth

Manoba cowleyi is a moth in the family Nolidae. It was described by Jeremy Daniel Holloway in 2003. It is found on Borneo. The habitat consists of lower montane forests on limestone.

The length of the forewings is 6–7 mm.
