= Manoba banghaasi =

Scientific classification
- Kingdom: Animalia
- Phylum: Arthropoda
- Clade: Pancrustacea
- Class: Insecta
- Order: Lepidoptera
- Superfamily: Noctuoidea
- Family: Nolidae
- Genus: Manoba
- Species: M. banghaasi

Binomial name
- Manoba banghaasi (West, 1929)

Synonyms
- Nola banghaasi West, 1929; Nola banghaasi sumi Inoue, 1956

Species of moth

Manoba banghaasi is a moth in the family Nolidae. It was described by West in 1929. It is found in Japan.
