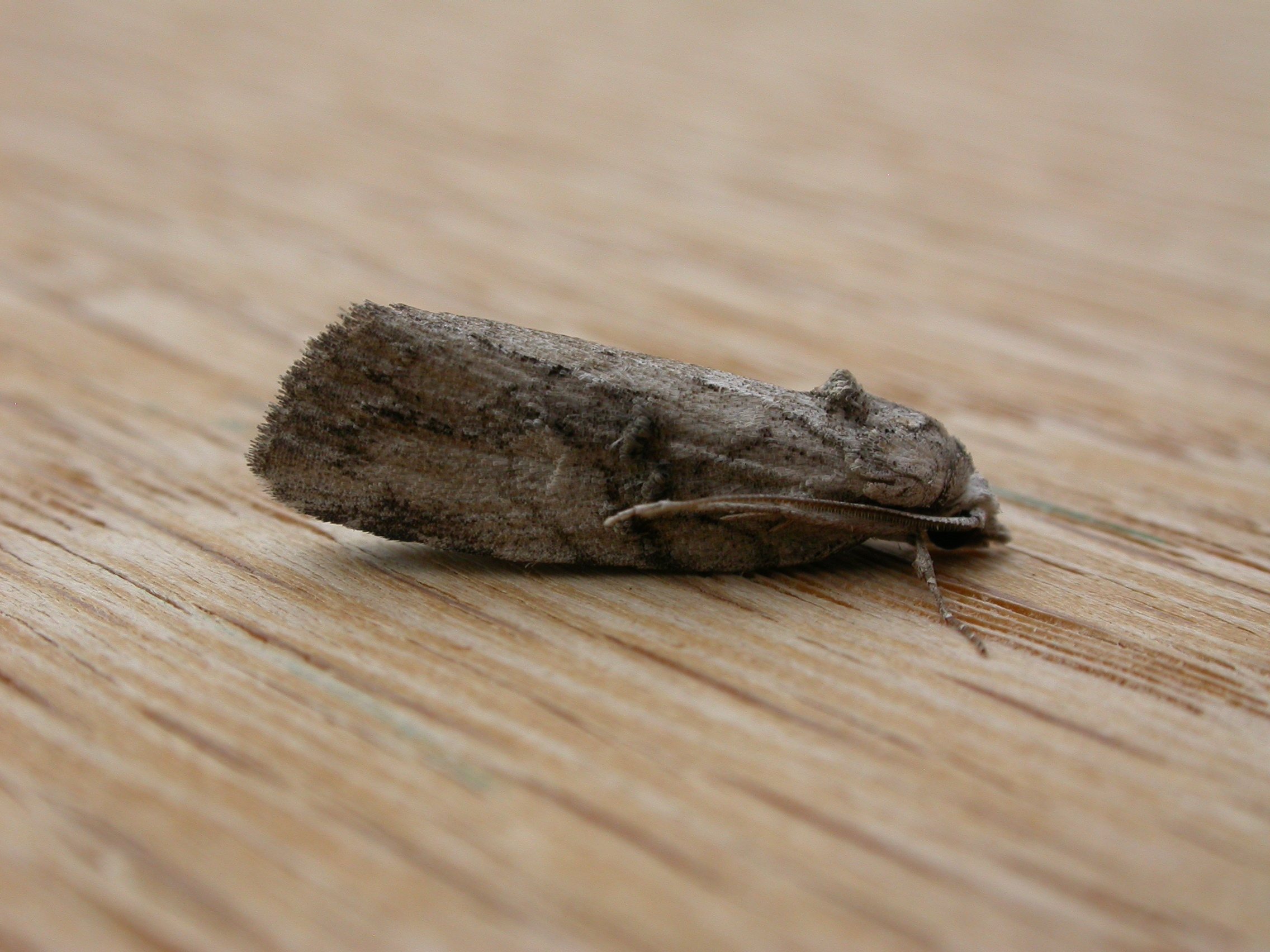
- Aquita plagiochyta

Scientific classification
- Kingdom: Animalia
- Phylum: Arthropoda
- Class: Insecta
- Order: Lepidoptera
- Superfamily: Noctuoidea
- Family: Nolidae
- Subfamily: Nolinae
- Genus: Aquita; Walker, 1863

Synonyms
- Zia Walker, 1863

= Aquita =

Genus of moths

Aquita is a genus of moths in the family Nolidae.

== Species ==
- Aquita acontioides (Walker, 1862)
- Aquita capnodes (Wileman and West, 1928)
- Aquita ectrocta (Hampson, 1907)
- Aquita grisea (Hampson, 1914)
- Aquita hemiphaea (Hampson, 1905)
- Aquita laminata (Hampson, 1891) (syn: Aquita rufescens (Hampson, 1894))
- Aquita leucobaeta (Wileman and West, 1928)
- Aquita plagiochyta (Turner, 1944)
- Aquita scoparialis (Wileman and West, 1928)
- Aquita seria Holloway, 2003
- Aquita tactalis (Walker, 1863) (syn: Aquita horridella Walker, 1863)

Aquita lunisigna (Hampson, 1898) is now known as Barasa lunisigna.
