= Manoba potterorum =

Scientific classification
- Kingdom: Animalia
- Phylum: Arthropoda
- Clade: Pancrustacea
- Class: Insecta
- Order: Lepidoptera
- Superfamily: Noctuoidea
- Family: Nolidae
- Genus: Manoba
- Species: M. potterorum

Binomial name
- Manoba potterorum Holloway, 2003

Species of moth

Manoba potterorum is a moth in the family Nolidae. It was described by Jeremy Daniel Holloway in 2003. It is found on Borneo. The habitat consists of lowland areas.

The length of the forewings is about 6 mm.
