= Stictane bipunctulata =

Scientific classification
- Domain: Eukaryota
- Kingdom: Animalia
- Phylum: Arthropoda
- Class: Insecta
- Order: Lepidoptera
- Superfamily: Noctuoidea
- Family: Erebidae
- Subfamily: Arctiinae
- Genus: Stictane
- Species: S. bipunctulata

Binomial name
- Stictane bipunctulata (van Eecke, 1927)

Synonyms
- Manoba bipunctulata van Eecke, 1927

Species of moth

Stictane bipunctulata is a moth in the family Erebidae. It was described by van Eecke in 1927. It is found on Sumatra in Indonesia.
