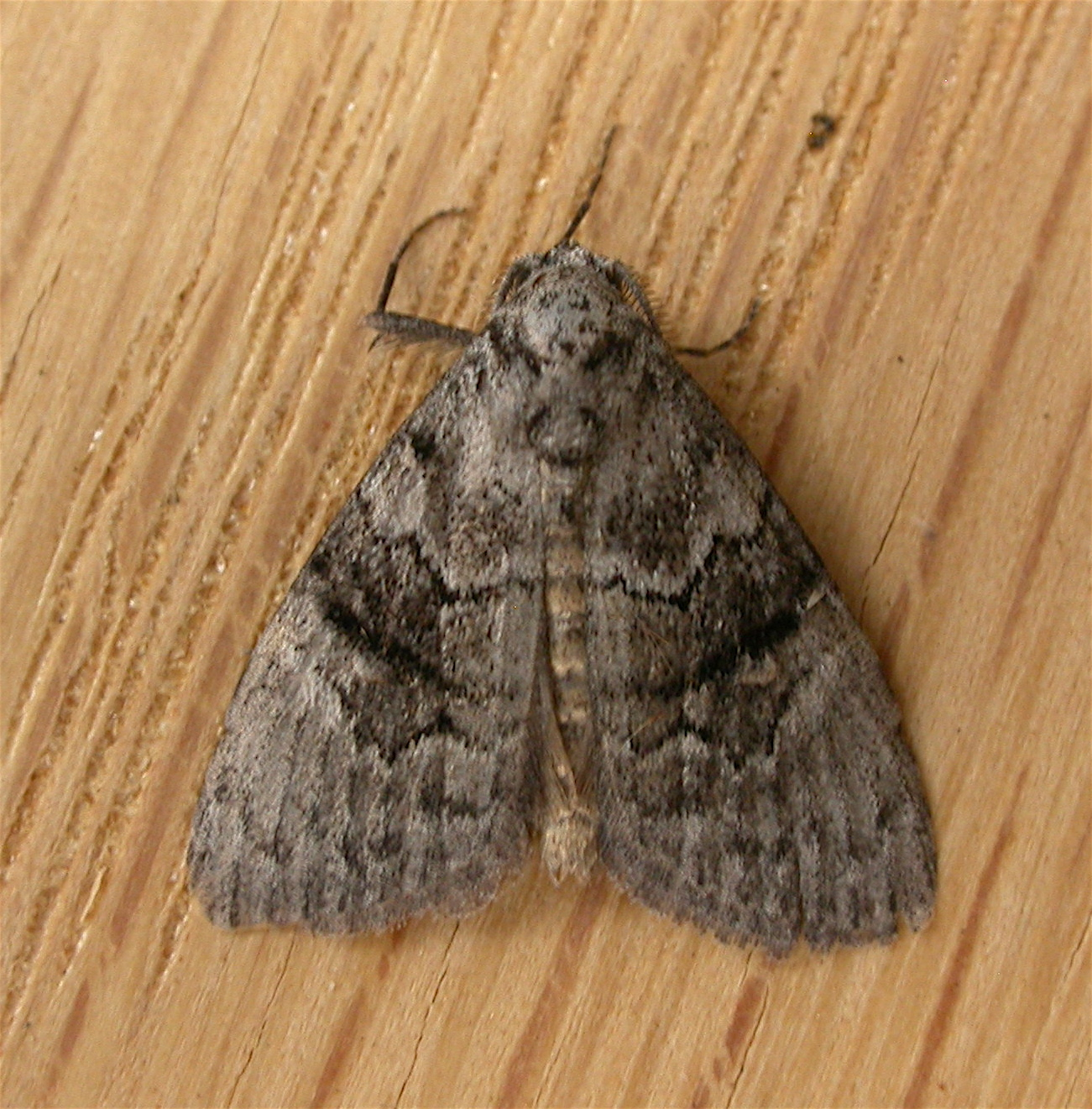
- Uraba lugens

Scientific classification
- Domain: Eukaryota
- Kingdom: Animalia
- Phylum: Arthropoda
- Class: Insecta
- Order: Lepidoptera
- Superfamily: Noctuoidea
- Family: Nolidae
- Subfamily: Nolinae
- Genus: Uraba; Walker, 1863

= Uraba (moth) =

Genus of moths

Uraba is a genus of moths of the family Nolidae erected by Francis Walker in 1863.

It has been considered a synonym of Roeselia.

== Species ==
- Uraba deplanana Walker, 1866
- Uraba lugens Walker, 1863
