= Stictane fractilinea =

Scientific classification
- Domain: Eukaryota
- Kingdom: Animalia
- Phylum: Arthropoda
- Class: Insecta
- Order: Lepidoptera
- Superfamily: Noctuoidea
- Family: Erebidae
- Subfamily: Arctiinae
- Genus: Stictane
- Species: S. fractilinea

Binomial name
- Stictane fractilinea (Snellen, 1880)

Synonyms
- Pitane fractilinea Snellen, 1880; Eugoa multipuncta Hampson, 1893

Species of insect

Stictane fractilinea is a moth in the family Erebidae. It was described by Snellen in 1880. It is found on Sumatra and possibly in India (Sikkim), Sri Lanka and on Java.
