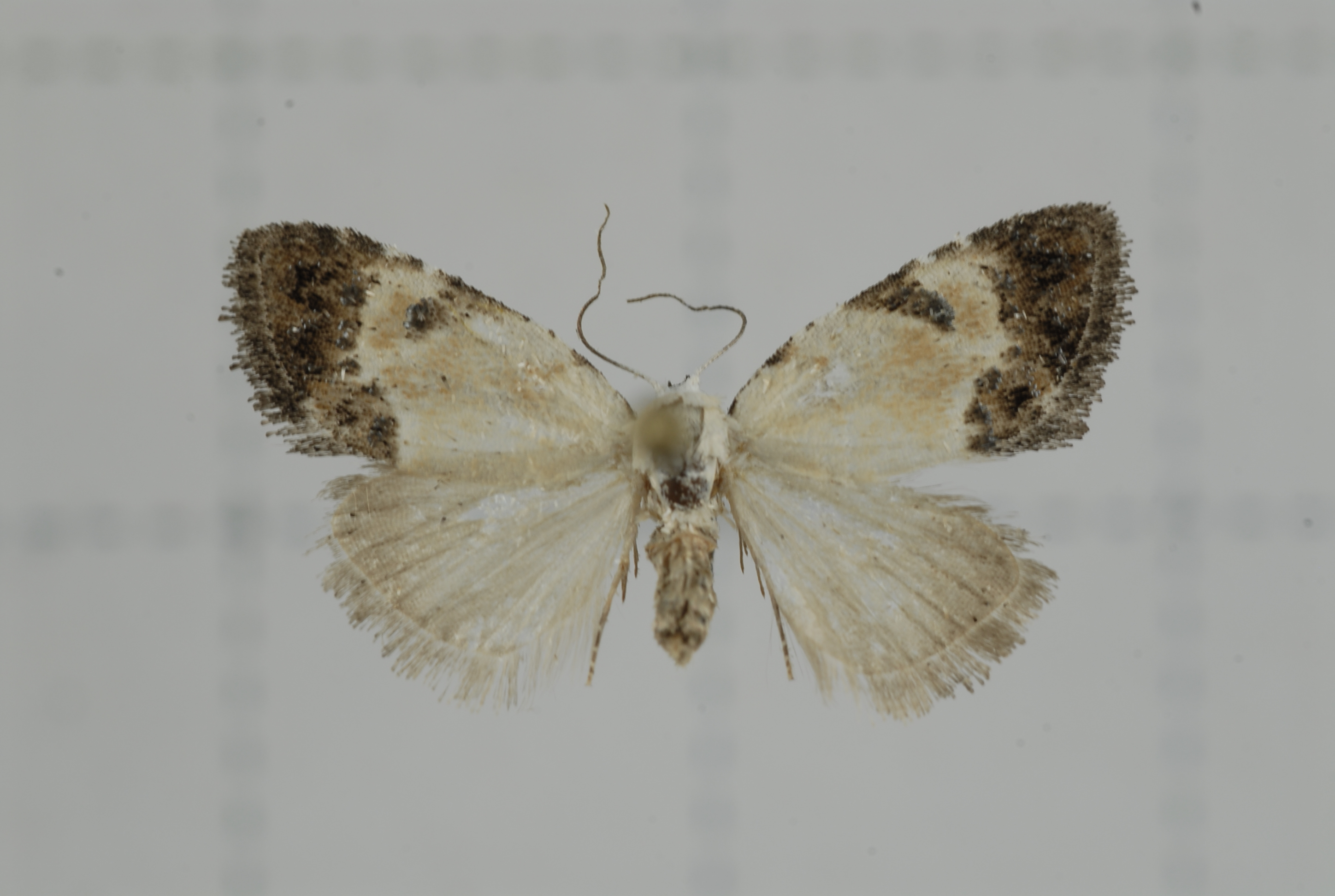

Scientific classification
- Kingdom: Animalia
- Phylum: Arthropoda
- Clade: Pancrustacea
- Class: Insecta
- Order: Lepidoptera
- Superfamily: Noctuoidea
- Family: Nolidae
- Genus: Casminola
- Species: C. yoshimotoi

Binomial name
- Casminola yoshimotoi (Inoue, 2000)

Synonyms
- Rhynchopalpus yoshimotoi Inoue, 2000; Manoba yoshimotoi

= Casminola yoshimotoi =

Species of moth

Casminola yoshimotoi is a moth in the family Nolidae. It was discovered by Hiroshi Inoue in 2000. The moth is found in Taiwan and Thailand.

The wingspan is 15–16 mm.
