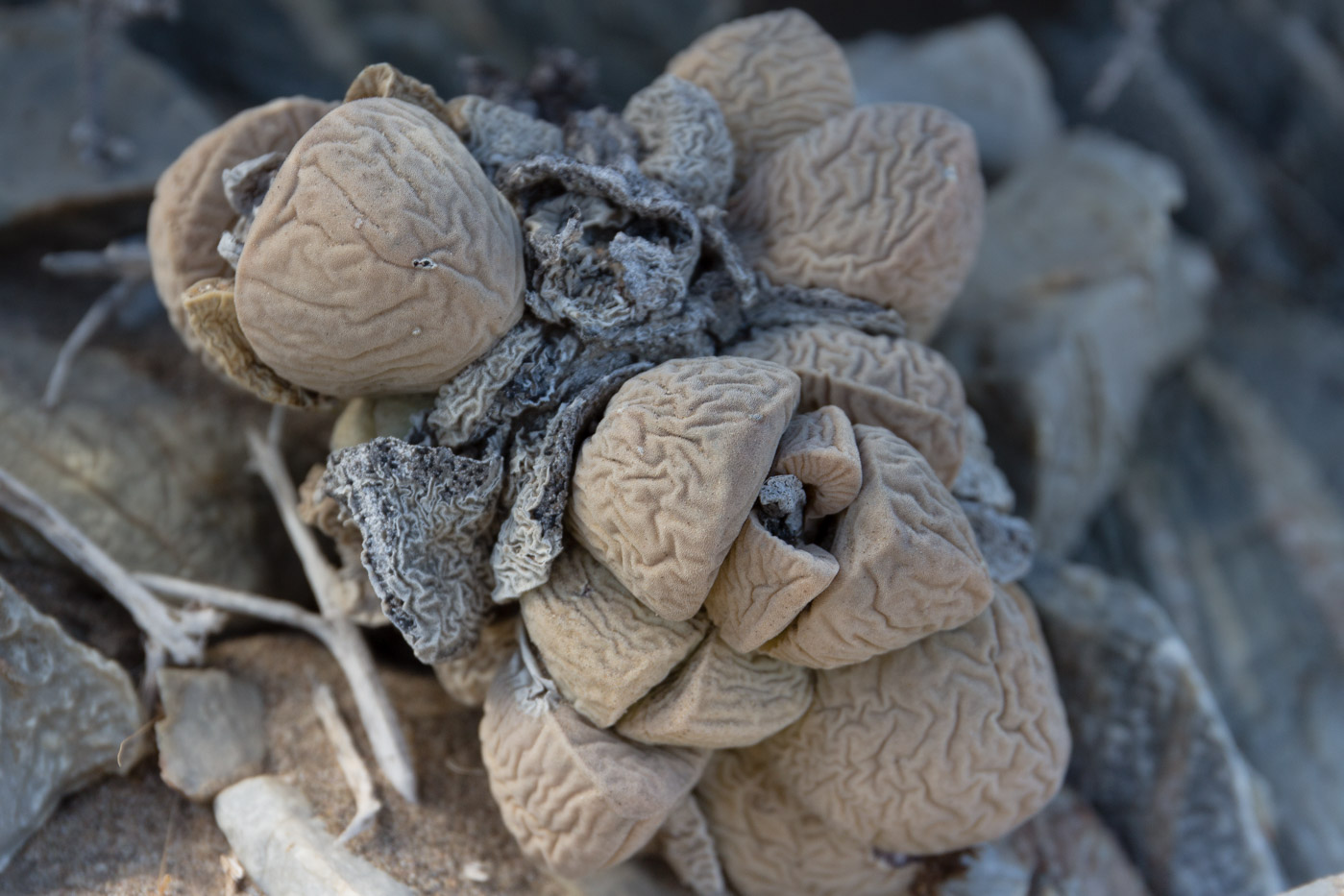

Conservation status
- Endangered (IUCN 3.1)

Scientific classification
- Kingdom: Plantae
- Clade: Tracheophytes
- Clade: Angiosperms
- Clade: Eudicots
- Order: Caryophyllales
- Family: Aizoaceae
- Genus: Namibia
- Species: N. cinerea

Binomial name
- Namibia cinerea (Marloth) Dinter & Schwantes

Synonyms
- Homotypic Synonyms: Juttadinteria cinerea (Marloth) Schwantes; Mesembryanthemum cinereum Marloth; Heterotypic Synonyms: Juttadinteria longipetala L.Bolus; Mesembryanthemum ponderosum Dinter; Namibia ponderosa (Dinter) Dinter & Schwantes ex H.Jacobsen

= Namibia cinerea =

Species of succulent

Namibia cinerea is a species of flowering plant in the family Aizoaceae. It is endemic to Namibia. Its natural habitat is rocky areas. It is threatened by habitat loss.
