= Stictane rectilinea =

Scientific classification
- Kingdom: Animalia
- Phylum: Arthropoda
- Class: Insecta
- Order: Lepidoptera
- Superfamily: Noctuoidea
- Family: Erebidae
- Subfamily: Arctiinae
- Genus: Stictane
- Species: S. rectilinea

Binomial name
- Stictane rectilinea (Snellen, 1879)

Synonyms
- Pitane rectilinea Snellen, 1879

Species of moth

Stictane rectilinea is a moth in the family Erebidae. It was described by Snellen in 1879. It is found in China, Singapore and on Sulawesi in Indonesia.
