= Xenonola =

Scientific classification
- Domain: Eukaryota
- Kingdom: Animalia
- Phylum: Arthropoda
- Class: Insecta
- Order: Lepidoptera
- Superfamily: Noctuoidea
- Family: Nolidae
- Genus: Xenonola; Wileman & West, 1928
- Species: X. limbata

Binomial name
- Xenonola limbata (Wileman, 1915)

Synonyms
- Erastroides limbata Wileman, 1915

Genus of moths

Xenonola is a monotypic moth genus of the family Nolidae described by Wileman and West in 1928. Its only species, Xenonola limbata, was first described by Wileman in 1915. It is found in Taiwan.
