= Stictane taeniatus =

Scientific classification
- Domain: Eukaryota
- Kingdom: Animalia
- Phylum: Arthropoda
- Class: Insecta
- Order: Lepidoptera
- Superfamily: Noctuoidea
- Family: Erebidae
- Subfamily: Arctiinae
- Genus: Stictane
- Species: S. taeniatus

Binomial name
- Stictane taeniatus (Rothschild, 1916)

Synonyms
- Manoba taeniatus Rothschild, 1916

Species of moth

Stictane taeniatus is a moth in the subfamily Arctiinae. It was described by Walter Rothschild in 1916. It is found in New Guinea.
