= Stictane obscura =

Scientific classification
- Kingdom: Animalia
- Phylum: Arthropoda
- Class: Insecta
- Order: Lepidoptera
- Superfamily: Noctuoidea
- Family: Erebidae
- Subfamily: Arctiinae
- Genus: Stictane
- Species: S. obscura

Binomial name
- Stictane obscura (Inoue, 1976)

Synonyms
- Manoba obscura Inoue, 1976

Species of moth

Stictane obscura is a moth in the subfamily Arctiinae. It was described by Hiroshi Inoue in 1976. It is found in Japan.
