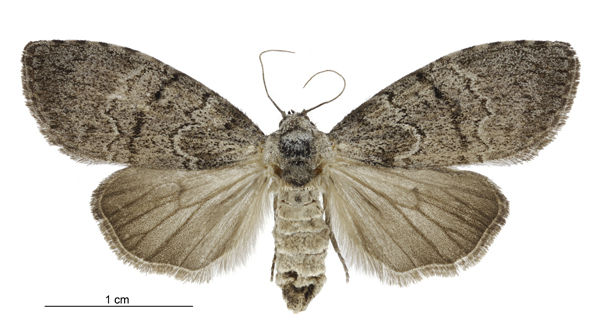
- Female
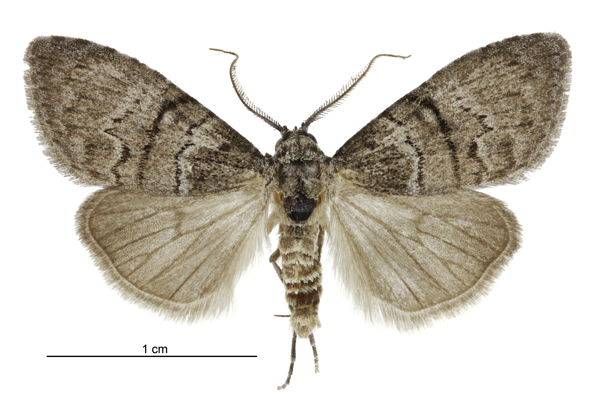
- Male

Scientific classification
- Kingdom: Animalia
- Phylum: Arthropoda
- Clade: Pancrustacea
- Class: Insecta
- Order: Lepidoptera
- Superfamily: Noctuoidea
- Family: Nolidae
- Genus: Uraba
- Species: U. lugens

Binomial name
- Uraba lugens Walker, 1866

Synonyms
- Selca obscura; Roselia lugens

= Uraba lugens =

Species of moth

Uraba lugens, the gum-leaf skeletoniser, is a moth of the family Nolidae. It is found in Australia and New Zealand. The larvae are a serious pest of Eucalyptus species and their close relatives. The wingspan is 25–30 mm. In Australia there are about one or two generations per year.

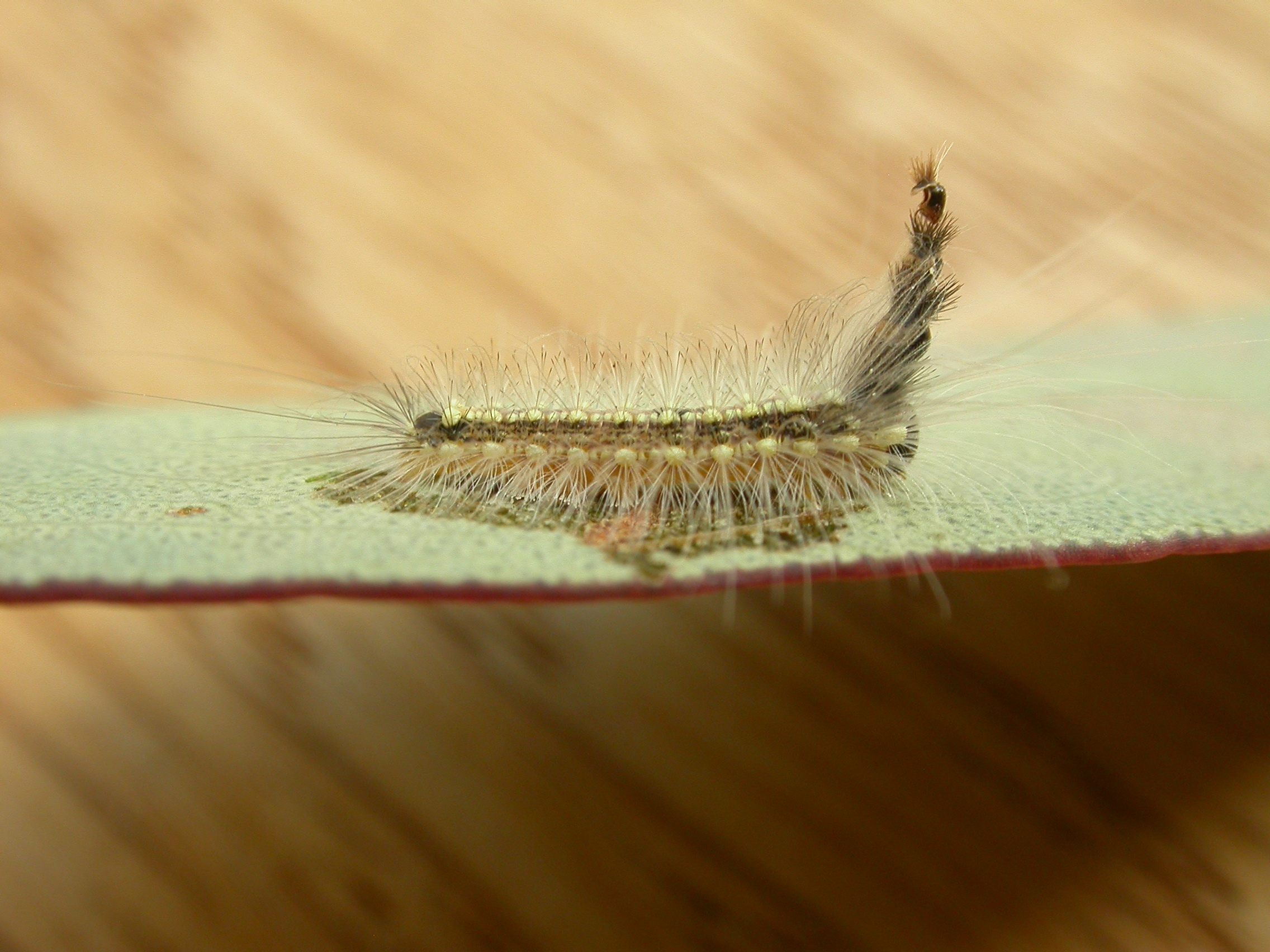
Uraba lugens larva on juvenile Eucalyptus melliodora foliage

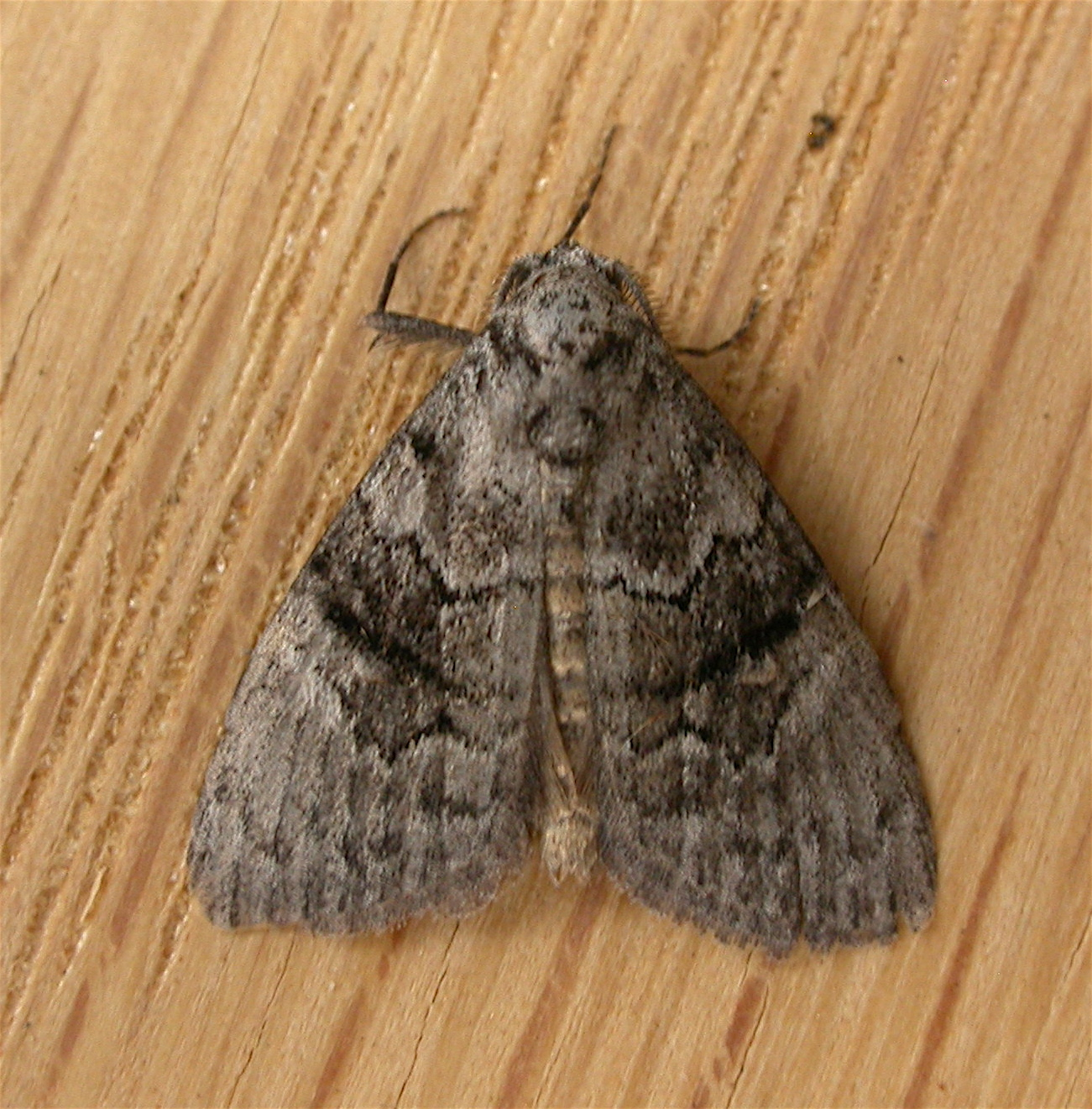
Uraba lugens

== General ==
Uraba lugens is nicknamed the mad hatterpillar because of its distinctive exoskeletal feature. Every time it sheds the head portion of its exoskeleton, the exoskeleton stays attached to its body. Over time, developing through its life span, the head grows bigger and sheds increasingly larger exoskeleton shells, which build up underneath each other.

Uraba lugens develops as a typical moth. The life cycles occur twice a year: once in the summer and once in the winter. Eggs are laid in groups of 100–200 and are about 1 mm in diameter. Caterpillars are mostly yellow with some black markings. After hatching from a cocoon, the resulting moths are grey in colour. During the larval stage, Uraba lugens can cause damage to trees by chewing.

== Pest ==
In 2001, an infestation of U. lugens was discovered in south-west Auckland. By 2007, the population had established throughout the greater Auckland area and was still spreading. Management programmes were created and potential biological control agents were tested.

Because the U. lugens is also found in Australia, and extensive parasitoid networks already exist there, four Australian parasitoids were quarantined in New Zealand and tested for their efficiency in controlling the New Zealand population. These species were larvae parasitoids Cotesia urabae, Dolichogenidea eucalypti, Euplectrus species and larvae/pupal parasitoid Eriborus species.

Native New Zealand species were also tested for biological control, as it would be preferable to use native species rather than imported species if there was enough parasitism to suppress the pest population. The two native species assessed were Meteorus pulchricornis and Xanthopimpla rhopaloceros, both being pupal parasitoids. Both were unsuccessful for biological control. M. pulchricornis had a higher parasitism rate of alternative hosts than that of the target host, and X. rhopaloceros failed to recognise the target host when they did not have cocoons.

Of the four species imported, D. eucalypti did not survive transport, the Eriborus species did not reproduce in captivity, and Euplectrus species were lost after one generation. Parasitism rates and non-target effects including negative and positive effects were assessed. C. urabae was considered the most successful, as it successfully attacked U. lugens, survived multiple generations and had preferred to attack U. lugens when choice of hosts was present.
