= Nemacerota cinerea =

Scientific classification
- Domain: Eukaryota
- Kingdom: Animalia
- Phylum: Arthropoda
- Class: Insecta
- Order: Lepidoptera
- Family: Drepanidae
- Genus: Nemacerota
- Species: N. cinerea

Binomial name
- Nemacerota cinerea (Warren, 1888)

Synonyms
- Asphalia cinerea Warren, 1888

Species of false owlet moth

Nemacerota cinerea is a moth in the family Drepanidae. It was described by Warren in 1888. It is found in India (Himachal Pradesh).

The wingspan is about 40 mm. The forewings are dull grey, with a slight pink tinge and rather sparsely scaled. There are two or three short black dashes from the base. Before and beyond the middle is a double black transverse line, the former forms an angle on the median vein pointing towards the base of the wing, the latter an angle pointing outwards. The part above the angle forms a single curve which is concave outwards. The part below the angle forms a double curve. There is an indistinct pale submarginal line and the veins are varied with black and white. The hindwings are pale dull grey with a rounded margin.
