= Stenopsestis alternata =

Scientific classification
- Domain: Eukaryota
- Kingdom: Animalia
- Phylum: Arthropoda
- Class: Insecta
- Order: Lepidoptera
- Family: Drepanidae
- Genus: Stenopsestis
- Species: S. alternata

Binomial name
- Stenopsestis alternata (Moore, 1881)

Synonyms
- Palimpsestis alternata Moore, 1881; Stenopsestis alternata bryki Yoshimoto, 1993; Nemacerota alternata Moore, 1881

Species of false owlet moth

Stenopsestis alternata is a moth in the family Drepanidae. It is found in Sikkim in India, Nepal, Myanmar, Thailand, and the Chinese provinces of Gansu, Hubei, Jiangxi, Hunan, Guangdong, Guangxi, Sichuan, Yunnan and Tibet.

The forewings are pale metallic cupreous brown, crossed by a broad basal, a median, and two narrow submarginal greenish-grey indistinct bands. There are some black basal spots, an antemedian and postmedian transverse black sinuous line and black and white streaks externally along the veins. The hindwings and abdomen are pale cupreous brown.
