= Stictane obliquilinea =

Scientific classification
- Kingdom: Animalia
- Phylum: Arthropoda
- Class: Insecta
- Order: Lepidoptera
- Superfamily: Noctuoidea
- Family: Erebidae
- Subfamily: Arctiinae
- Genus: Stictane
- Species: S. obliquilinea

Binomial name
- Stictane obliquilinea Hampson, 1900

Species of moth

Stictane obliquilinea is a moth in the family Erebidae. It was described by George Hampson in 1900. It is found in Sri Lanka.
