= Thomas J. Witt =

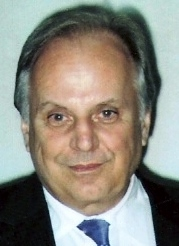
Thomas J. Witt, Museum Witt
