= Donda (disambiguation) =

Donda is a 2021 album by Kanye West.

Donda may also refer to:

== People ==
- Donda West (1949–2007), teacher and the mother of Kanye West
- Mariano Donda (born 1982), Argentine footballer
- Victoria Donda (born 1977), Argentine human rights activist and legislator
- Professor A. Dońda, a fictional scientist made by Polish science fiction writer Stanisław Lem

== Music ==
- Donda 2, an album by Kanye West, 2022
- "Donda Chant", a song by Kanye West, 2021
- "Donda", a song by Kanye West from Donda, 2021

== Other ==
- Donda (company), founded by Kanye West in 2012
- Donda Academy, founded by Kanye West in 2022
- Donda (moth), a genus of moths of the family Erebidae
