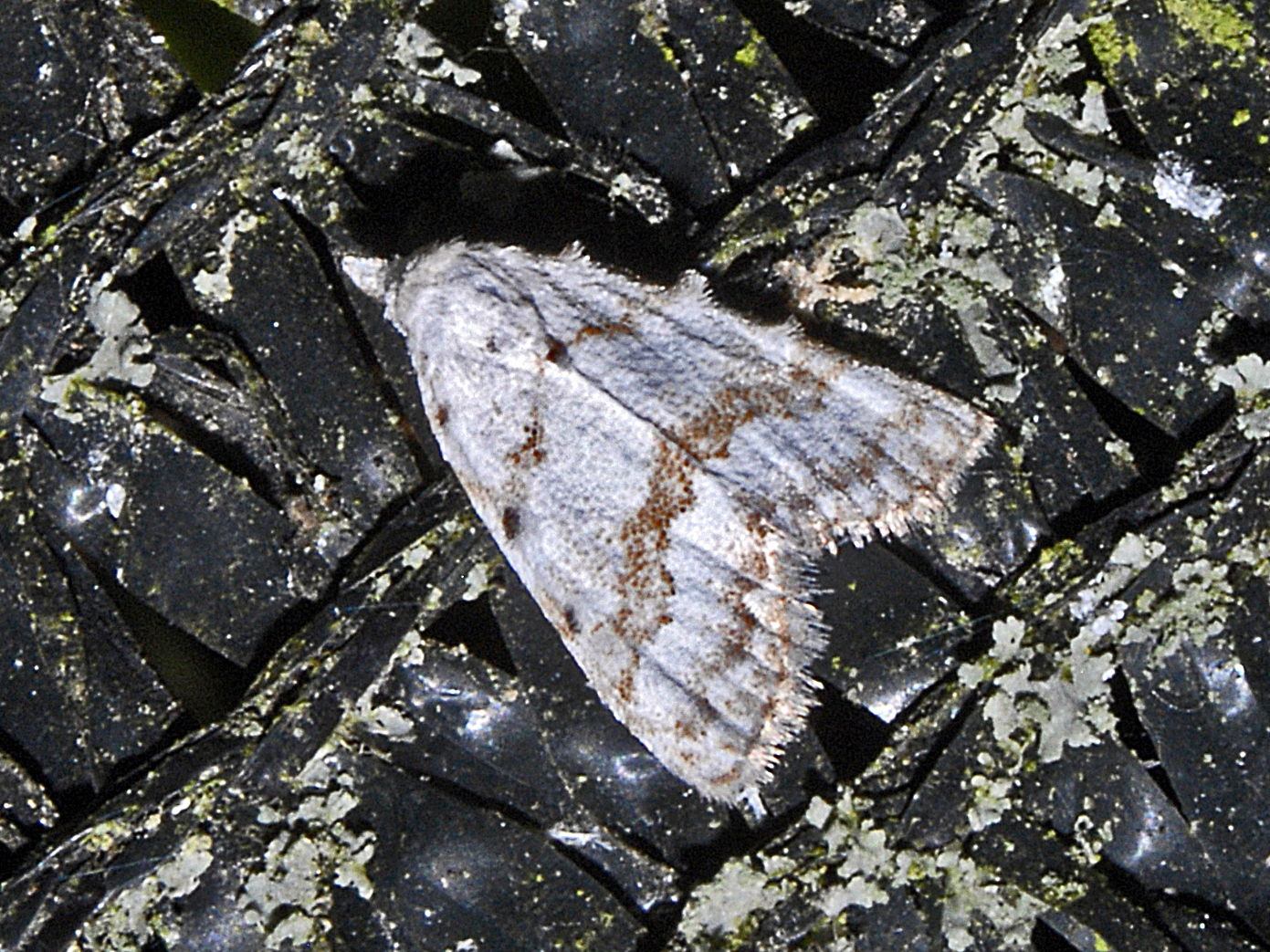
- Nola aerugula

Scientific classification
- Kingdom: Animalia
- Phylum: Arthropoda
- Clade: Pancrustacea
- Class: Insecta
- Order: Lepidoptera
- Superfamily: Noctuoidea
- Family: Nolidae
- Subfamily: Nolinae
- Genus: Nola; Leach, 1815

= Nola (moth) =

Genus of moths

Nola is a genus of moths described by William Elford Leach in 1815. They are the namesake of the subfamily Nolinae and the family Nolidae. This genus occurs worldwide wherever suitable habitat is present.

== Description ==
Palpi are porrect (extending forward), moderately long with thick scales. Antennae are fasciculated in male. Mid tibia with single spur pair, whereas hind tibia with two pairs. Forewings with vein 5 from angle of cell, vein 6 from upper angle, veins 7 and 8 stalked and veins 8 and 10 absent. Hindwing with vein 3 from before angle of cell, vein 5 absent, veins 6 and 7 stalked and vein 8 from middle of cell.

== Species ==
- Nola achromata Hampson, 1900
- Nola acutapicalis Inoue, 1998
- Nola acutula Püngeler, 1902
- Nola adelpha (D. S. Fletcher, 1958)
- Nola aegyptiaca Snellen, 1875
- Nola aenictis (Meyrick, 1888)
- Nola aerugula (Hübner, 1793)
- Nola aeschyntela Dyar, 1914
- Nola albalis (Walker, [1866])
- Nola albescens Bethune-Baker, 1908
- Nola albirufa (Schaus, 1905)
- Nola amorpha (Turner, 1944)
- Nola analis (Wileman & West, 1928)
- Nola ancipitalis (Herrich-Schäffer, [1851])
- Nola angola Bethune-Baker, 1911
- Nola angulata (Moore, 1888)
- Nola angustipennis Inoue, 1892
- Nola anisogona (Lower, 1893)
- Nola anpingicola (Strand, 1917)
- Nola apera Druce, 1897
- Nola apicalis (Hampson, 1903)
- Nola appelia (Hampson, 1900)
- Nola arana Schaus, 1896
- Nola argentea (Lucas, 1890)
- Nola argyrolepis Hampson, 1907
- Nola argyropasta (Hampson, 1914)
- Nola artata Schaus, 1912
- Nola astigma Hampson, 1894
- Nola atmophanes (Turner, 1944)
- Nola atripuncta (Hampson, 1909)
- Nola aulacota (Meyrick, 1886)
- Nola bananae Holland, 1920
- Nola baracoa Schaus, 1921
- Nola barbertonensis (Son, 1933)
- Nola basirufa (de Joannis, 1928)
- Nola bathycyrta (Turner, 1944)
- Nola belotypa Hampson, 1914
- Nola benguetensis Wileman, 1916
- Nola bicincta Hampson, 1905
- Nola bifascialis (Walker, [1865])
- Nola biguttalis (Walker, [1866])
- Nola bilineola (Rothschild, 1916)
- Nola bimaculata (van Eecke, 1920)
- Nola bionica Hampson, 1907
- Nola bistriga (Möschler, 1890)
- Nola bitransversata Holloway, 1979
- Nola biumbrata Schaus, 1912
- Nola brachystria Hampson, 1905
- Nola breyeri Köhler, 1924
- Nola brunneifera Dyar, 1914
- Nola caelata Draudt, 1918
- Nola calcicola Holloway, 2003
- Nola callis (van Eecke, 1920)
- Nola canioralis (Walker, 1863)
- Nola carilla (Schaus, 1911)
- Nola celaenephes (Turner, 1944)
- Nola celidota (Wileman & West, 1928)
- Nola ceramota (Turner, 1944)
- Nola cereella (Bosc, [1800]) - sorghum webworm
- Nola cerraunias (Turner, 1899)
- Nola ceylonica Hampson, 1893
- Nola chauna Dyar, 1914
- Nola chionaecensis (Hampson, 1914)
- Nola chionea Hampson, 1911
- Nola chlamitulalis (Hübner, [1813])
- Nola cicatricalis (Treitschke, 1835)
- Nola cilicoides (Grote, 1873)
- Nola cingalesa Moore, [1882]
- Nola classeyi Holloway, 2003
- Nola clethrae Dyar, 1899
- Nola coelobathra (Turner, 1944)
- Nola cogia (Schaus, 1921)
- Nola concinna (Hampson, 1918)
- Nola concinnula (Walker, 1863)
- Nola confusalis (Herrich-Schäffer, [1851])
- Nola conspicillaris D. S. Fletcher, 1962
- Nola contorta Dyar, 1914
- Nola coremata Holloway, 2003
- Nola coticula (van Eecke, 1920)
- Nola cretacea (Hampson, 1901)
- Nola cretaceoides Poole, 1989
- Nola cristatula (Hübner, 1793)
- Nola cristicostata (Rothschild, 1916)
- Nola crucigera (Turner, 1944)
- Nola cubensis Schaus, 1921
- Nola cucullatella (Linnaeus, 1758)
- Nola curvilinea (Wileman & South, 1919)
- Nola cycota (Meyrick, 1886)
- Nola cymatias (Turner, 1944)
- Nola delograpta (Turner, 1944)
- Nola dentilinea (Hampson, 1909)
- Nola desmotes (Turner, 1899)
- Nola diagona Hampson, 1911
- Nola diastropha (Turner, 1944)
- Nola dimera (Dognin, 1912)
- Nola diplogramma (Hampson, 1914)
- Nola diplozona Hampson, 1914
- Nola disticta (Hampson, 1900)
- Nola divisa Schaus, 1896
- Nola dochmographa D. S. Fletcher, 1958
- Nola doggensis Strand, 1920
- Nola drepanucha D. S. Fletcher, 1958
- Nola dresnayi (Warnecke, 1946)
- Nola duercki (Zerny, 1935)
- Nola duplicilinea (Hampson, 1900)
- Nola ebatoi (Inoue, 1970)
- Nola elaphra (Turner, 1944)
- Nola elaphropasta (Turner, 1944)
- Nola elsa Schaus, 1921
- Nola emi (Inoue, 1956)
- Nola endoscota Hampson, 1914
- Nola endotherma (Hampson, 1918)
- Nola enphaea (Hampson, 1901)
- Nola epicentra (Meyrick, 1886)
- Nola erythrostigmata Hampson, 1894
- Nola estonica Õunap, 2021
- Nola eucolpa (Turner, 1944)
- Nola eucompsa (Turner, 1944)
- Nola eugrapha Hampson, 1914
- Nola eupithecialis (Debauche, 1942)
- Nola euraphes (Turner, 1944)
- Nola eurrhyncha (Turner, 1944)
- Nola eurylopha Turner, 1944
- Nola euryzonata (Hampson, 1900)
- Nola exumbrata Inoue, 1976
- Nola faircloughi Holloway, 2003
- Nola fasciata (Walker, 1866)
- Nola fenula van Eecke, 1926
- Nola fijiensis Robinson, 1975
- Nola fisheri Holloway, 2003
- Nola flavescens Dyar, 1914
- Nola flaviciliata (Hampson, 1901)
- Nola flavicosta (Kiriakoff, 1958)
- Nola flavomarginata (Rothschild, 1916)
- Nola flexuosa Poujade, 1886
- Nola folgona Schaus, 1921
- Nola foliola (van Eecke, 1926)
- Nola formosalesa (Wileman & West, 1928)
- Nola fortulalis (van Eecke, 1926)
- Nola fovifera (Hampson, 1903)
- Nola foviferoides Poole, 1989
- Nola fraterna (Moore, 1888)
- Nola furvitincta (Hampson, 1914)
- Nola fuscantea (van Eecke, 1920)
- Nola fuscata Wileman & West, 1928
- Nola fuscibasalis (Hampson, 1896)
- Nola fuscibasis (Bethune-Baker, 1904)
- Nola fuscimarginalis Wileman, 1914
- Nola geminata (Mabille, 1900)
- Nola goniophora Turner, 1944
- Nola gorgoruensis Strand, 1920
- Nola grisalis Hampson, 1893
- Nola habrophyes Dyar, 1914
- Nola harouni (Wiltshire, 1951)
- Nola helpsi Holloway, 2003
- Nola herbuloti Toulgoët, 1982
- Nola hermana Schaus, 1896
- Nola hesycha (Meyrick, 1888)
- Nola hiranoi Inoue
- Nola holoscota Hampson, 1920
- Nola hyalospila (Hampson, 1914)
- Nola hypenoides Talbot, 1929
- Nola imitata (Son, 1933)
- Nola inconspicua Alphéraky, 1882
- Nola ineffectalis (Walker)
- Nola infralba Inoue, 1976
- Nola infranigra Inoue, 1976
- Nola innocua Butler, 1880
- Nola insularum (Collenette, 1928)
- Nola intermedia Druce, 1885
- Nola internella (Walker, [1865])
- Nola internelloides (van Eecke, 1926)
- Nola interrupta Pagenstecher, 1884
- Nola interruptoides Poole, 1989
- Nola interspera (Lucas, 1890)
- Nola involuta Dyar, 1898 (=Nola exposita Dyar, 1898, Nola aphyla (Hampson, 1900))
- Nola irenica (Meyrick, 1886)
- Nola iridescens (Son, 1933)
- Nola irrorata (Rothschild, 1915)
- Nola japoniba (Strand, 1920)
- Nola jarvisi Holloway, 2003
- Nola joanna Schaus, 1921
- Nola jourdani (Legrand, 1965)
- Nola juvenis (Holland, 1893)
- Nola kanshireiensis (Wileman & South, 1916)
- Nola karelica Tengström, 1869
- Nola kennedyi D. S. Fletcher, 1958
- Nola kreuteli (Vartian, 1963)
- Nola lagunculariae Dyar, 1899
- Nola laticincta Hampson, 1896
- Nola lechriopa Hampson, 1914
- Nola lechriotropa (Turner, 1944)
- Nola leucalea Hampson, 1907
- Nola leucographa D. S. Fletcher, 1958
- Nola leucolopha (Turner, 1944)
- Nola leucoma (Meyrick, 1886)
- Nola leucoscopula (Hampson, 1907)
- Nola lichenosa Robinson, 1975
- Nola limona Schaus, 1921
- Nola lindemannae D. S. Fletcher, 1962
- Nola liparisalis (Walker, 1865)
- Nola loxoscia Hampson, 1900
- Nola lucidalis (Walker, [1865])
- Nola lutulenta (Wileman & West, 1928)
- Nola luzonalesa (Wileman & West, 1928)
- Nola maculifera (Turner, 1944)
- Nola maia Schaus, 1912
- Nola marginata Hampson, 1895
- Nola maria Schaus, 1921
- Nola marshallae Holloway, 2003
- Nola melaleuca (Hampson, 1901)
- Nola melalopha (Hampson, 1900)
- Nola melanchysis Hampson, 1900
- Nola melanogramma Hampson, 1900
- Nola melanoscelis (Hampson, 1914)
- Nola melicerta Druce, 1885
- Nola meridionalis Wallengren, 1875
- Nola mesographa Schaus, 1905
- Nola mesogyna Dognin, 1912
- Nola mesomelana (Hampson, 1900)
- Nola mesonephele (Hampson, 1914)
- Nola mesoscota Hampson, 1900
- Nola mesosticta (Hampson, 1900)
- Nola mesotherma (Hampson, 1909)
- Nola mesothermoides Poole, 1989
- Nola microlopha (Hampson, 1900)
- Nola microphila (Turner, 1899)
- Nola minna Butler, 1881
- Nola minna Butler, 1881
- Nola minutalis Leech, 1888
- Nola monofascia Son, 1933
- Nola monozona (Lower, 1897)
- Nola nami (Inoue, 1956)
- Nola nebulosa (Rothschild, 1916)
- Nola negrita Hampson, 1894
- Nola negrosensis Wileman & West, 1929
- Nola nephelepasa Dyar, 1914
- Nola nigrisparsa Hampson, 1896
- Nola nigrolineata (van Eecke, 1926)
- Nola nigroradiata Debauche, 1942
- Nola nimbimargo Dyar, 1914
- Nola niphostena (Lower, 1896)
- Nola niveibasis E. D. Jones, 1914
- Nola obliqua Bethune-Baker, 1908
- Nola obliquilinealis (Toulgoët, 1972)
- Nola ochrographa Hampson, 1911
- Nola ochrolopha (Hampson, 1911)
- Nola ochrosticha Turner, 1944
- Nola okanoi (Inoue, 1958)
- Nola oleaginalis (Toulgoët, 1972)
- Nola omphalota (Hampson, 1903)
- Nola opalina (Walker, 1862)
- Nola ovilla Grote, 1875
- Nola owgarra (Bethune-Baker, 1908)
- Nola pallescens Wileman & West, 1929
- Nola parallacta (Meyrick, 1886)
- Nola parana Schaus, 1921
- Nola paromoea (Meyrick, 1886)
- Nola paroxynta (Meyrick, 1886)
- Nola parvitis (Howes, 1917)
- Nola parwana (Ebert, 1973)
- Nola pascua (Swinhoe, 1885)
- Nola patina Druce, 1885
- Nola patricia Son, 1933
- Nola pauai Wileman & West, 1928
- Nola pedata D. S. Fletcher, 1962
- Nola peguensis (Hampson, 1894)
- Nola perfusca Hampson, 1911
- Nola perluta Draudt, 1918
- Nola phaea Hampson, 1900
- Nola phaeocraspis (Hampson, 1909)
- Nola phaeogramma (Turner, 1944)
- Nola phaeotermina (Hampson, 1918)
- Nola phloeophila Hampson, 1914
- Nola picturata Mabille, 1899
- Nola plagioschema Turner, 1939
- Nola platygona (Lower, 1897)
- Nola pleurochorda (Turner, 1944)
- Nola pleurosema (Turner, 1944)
- Nola polia (Hampson, 1900)
- Nola poliophasma (D. S. Fletcher, 1958)
- Nola poliophasma (Turner, 1933)
- Nola poliotis Hampson, 1907
- Nola porrigens (Walker, 1858)
- Nola pothina Turner, 1944
- Nola praefica Saalmüller, 1884
- Nola progonia (Hampson, 1914)
- Nola promelaena Hampson, 1914
- Nola prothyma Dyar, 1914
- Nola pulverea Hampson, 1900
- Nola pumila Snellen, 1875
- Nola punctilinea (Wileman & South, 1919)
- Nola punctivena Wileman, 1916
- Nola pura (D. S. Fletcher, 1957)
- Nola pustulata (Walker, 1865)
- Nola pycnographa (Turner, 1944)
- Nola pycnopasta (Turner, 1944)
- Nola pygmaea (Hampson, 1912)
- Nola pygmaeodes (Turner, 1944)
- Nola quadrimaculata Heylaerts, 1892
- Nola quilimanensis Strand, 1920
- Nola quintessa Dyar, 1914
- Nola ralphia (Schaus, 1921)
- Nola ralumensis (Strand, 1920)
- Nola recedens Schaus, 1921
- Nola robusta (Wileman & West, 1928)
- Nola rodea Schaus, 1896
- Nola rotundalis Toulgoët, 1982
- Nola rubescens Schaus, 1921
- Nola rufa (Hampson, 1900)
- Nola rufimixta (Hampson, 1900)
- Nola rufizonalis Hampson, 1918
- Nola sakishimana (Inoue, 2001)
- Nola samoana (Hampson, 1914)
- Nola santamaria Schaus, 1921
- Nola sarniensis (Son, 1933)
- Nola scabralis (Walker, [1866])
- Nola scruposa (Draudt, 1918)
- Nola semiconfusa Inoue, 1976
- Nola semidolosa (Walker, [1863])
- Nola semirufa (Dognin, 1914)
- Nola semograpta (Meyrick, 1886)
- Nola sertalis Toulgoët, 1982
- Nola sijthoffi van Eecke, 1920
- Nola simplex Wileman & West, 1929
- Nola sinuata Forbes, 1930
- Nola socotrensis (Hampson, 1901)
- Nola solvita Schaus, 1896
- Nola sperata Schaus, 1912
- Nola spermophaga D. S. Fletcher, 1962
- Nola sphaerospila (Turner, 1944)
- Nola spinivesica Holloway, 2003
- Nola squalida Staudinger, 1870
- Nola streptographia (Hampson, 1900)
- Nola subchlamydula Staudinger, 1871
- Nola suffusa (Hampson, 1900)
- Nola swierstrai Son, 1933
- Nola sylpha (Dyar, 1914)
- Nola synethes (D. S. Fletcher, 1958)
- Nola taeniata Snellen, 1875
- Nola taiwana Wileman & South, 1916
- Nola tarrawayi Holloway, 2003
- Nola tarzanae (Legrand, 1965)
- Nola tenebrosa Hampson, 1896
- Nola tenella (Hulstaert, 1924)
- Nola tetralopha (Turner, 1944)
- Nola tetrodon de Joannis, 1928
- Nola tholera (Turner, 1926)
- Nola thymula Millière, 1868
- Nola thyrophora (Hampson, 1914)
- Nola tincta Wileman & South, 1919
- Nola tineoides (Walker, [1858])
- Nola tornalis (Hampson 1914)
- Nola tornotis (Meyrick, 1888)
- Nola townsendi Tams, 1935
- Nola transecta Hampson, 1901
- Nola transitoria Son, 1933
- Nola transversata Robinson, 1975
- Nola transwallacea Holloway, 2003
- Nola triangulalis (Toulgoët, 1961)
- Nola trilinea Marumo, 1923
- Nola triplaga Dognin, 1914
- Nola tripuncta (Wileman, 1910)
- Nola triquetrana (Fitch, 1856)
- Nola trocha Dognin, 1897
- Nola tumulifera Hampson, 1893
- Nola turbana Schaus, 1921
- Nola tutulella Zerny, 1927
- Nola undulata (D. S. Fletcher, 1962)
- Nola varia Saalmüller, 1884
- Nola vepallida Turner, 1944
- Nola vernalis Lower, 1900
- Nola vernalis Lower, 1900
- Nola vesiculalis van Eecke, 1926
- Nola vicina (Roepke, 1948)
- Nola vidoti (Legrand, 1965)
- Nola wilsonae Holloway, 2003
- Nola yegua Schaus, 1921
- Nola yoshinensis (Wileman & West, 1929)
- Nola zaplethes Hampson, 1914
- Nola zeteci Dyar, 1914

== Taxonomy ==
The English zoologist William Elford Leach Leach raised the genus Nola in 1815 and placed it in the Tortricidae family. The genus is possibly named after the town in Campania, Italy. This was one of the earliest examples of using a place for the name of a genus, although he did not give an explanation as to why he chose Nola. It was one of the earliest examples of using a place for the name of a genus.
