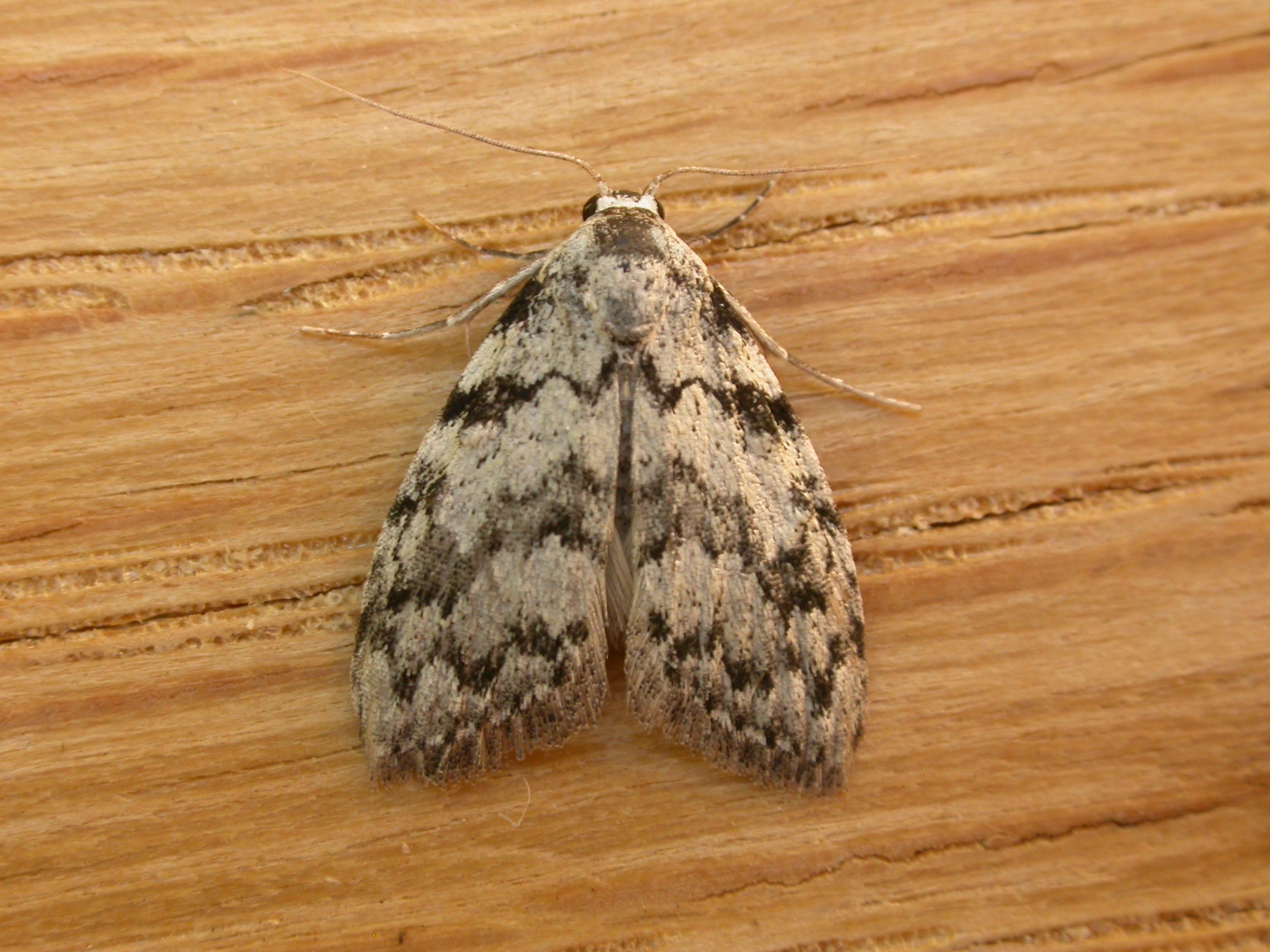

Scientific classification
- Kingdom: Animalia
- Phylum: Arthropoda
- Class: Insecta
- Order: Lepidoptera
- Superfamily: Noctuoidea
- Family: Nolidae
- Genus: Nola
- Species: N. melanogramma

Binomial name
- Nola melanogramma Hampson, 1900

Synonyms
- Celama chionocrana

= Nola melanogramma =

Species of moth

Nola melanogramma is a moth of the family Nolidae. It is found in Australia, including New South Wales and Tasmania.
