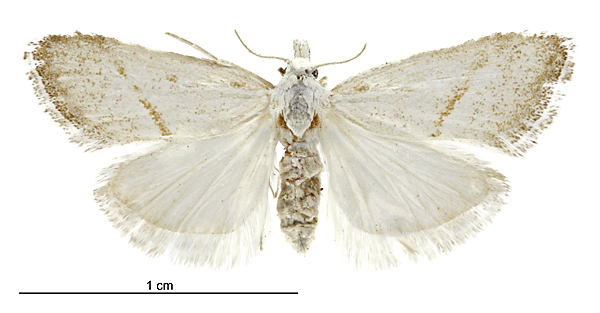
- Female
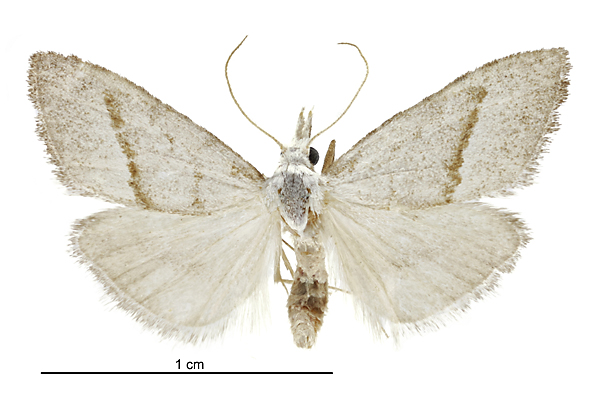
- Male

Scientific classification
- Kingdom: Animalia
- Phylum: Arthropoda
- Clade: Pancrustacea
- Class: Insecta
- Order: Lepidoptera
- Superfamily: Noctuoidea
- Family: Nolidae
- Genus: Nola
- Species: N. parvitis

Binomial name
- Nola parvitis (Howes, 1917)

Synonyms
- Adeixis parvitis Howes, 1917; Celama parvitis (Howes, 1917)

= Nola parvitis =

Species of moth endemic to New Zealand

Nola parvitis is a moth of the family Nolidae. It was first described by George Howes in 1917. This species is endemic to New Zealand and has been observed in the South Island and in central and southern parts of the North Island. Larvae are active during April to November and the larval host plant of this species is Helichrysum lanceolatum.

== Taxonomy ==
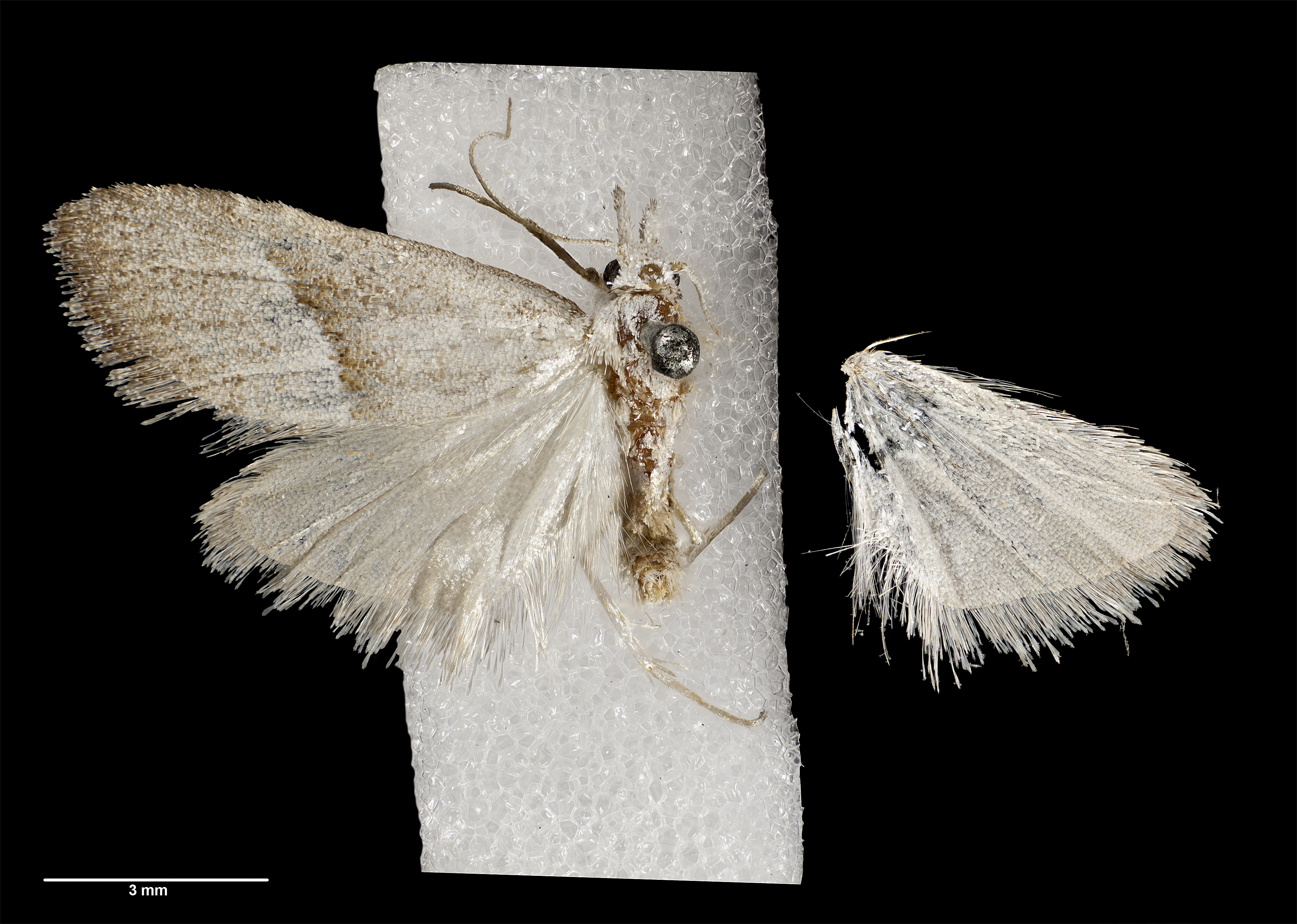
Holotype specimen held at Auckland Museum.

This species was first described by George Howes in 1917 and was originally named Adeixis parvitis. In 1927 Alfred Philpott placed this species in the genus Celama. George Hudson discussed and illustrated this species under this name in his 1928 book The butterflies and moths of New Zealand. John S. Dugdale also discussed this species under this name in 1988. In 2010 this species was listed under the genus Nola in the New Zealand Inventory of Biodiversity. The male holotype specimen was collected at Harbour Cone, Broad Bay in Dunedin by Charles E. Clarke and is held at the Auckland War Memorial Museum.

== Description ==
Hudson described this species as follows:

The expansion of the wings is 5/8 inch. The fore-wings are triangular with the termen obliquely rounded; very pale whitish- grey; there is a slightly-curved oblique brownish-black bar across the middle of the disc and a dark grey shading around the apex and along the termen; a few scattered yellowish scales are situated on the discal bar. The hind-wings and cilia are greyish-white.

== Distribution ==
N. parvitis is endemic to New Zealand and has been observed in the South Island and the southern parts of the North Island. Specimens have been found in Broad Bay, Otago and Aniseed Valley in Nelson. A specimen was also collected south east of Te Anau where it was described by Charles E. Clarke as being a rare moth that was taken in December amongst Leptospermum. This species has been collected in December in the Dansey ecological district, near Kakanui, on Helichrysum lanceolatum. N. parvitis has also been observed in the North Island in the Wairarapa and near Lake Waikaremoana.

== Host species ==
The larval host plant for this species is Helichrysum lanceolatum.

== Behaviour ==
Larvae of this specie are present during the months of April to November.

== Parasites ==
When the biocontrol release of Cotesia urabae was considered for New Zealand, research showed that this parasitic wasp posed a low risk to N. parvitis.
