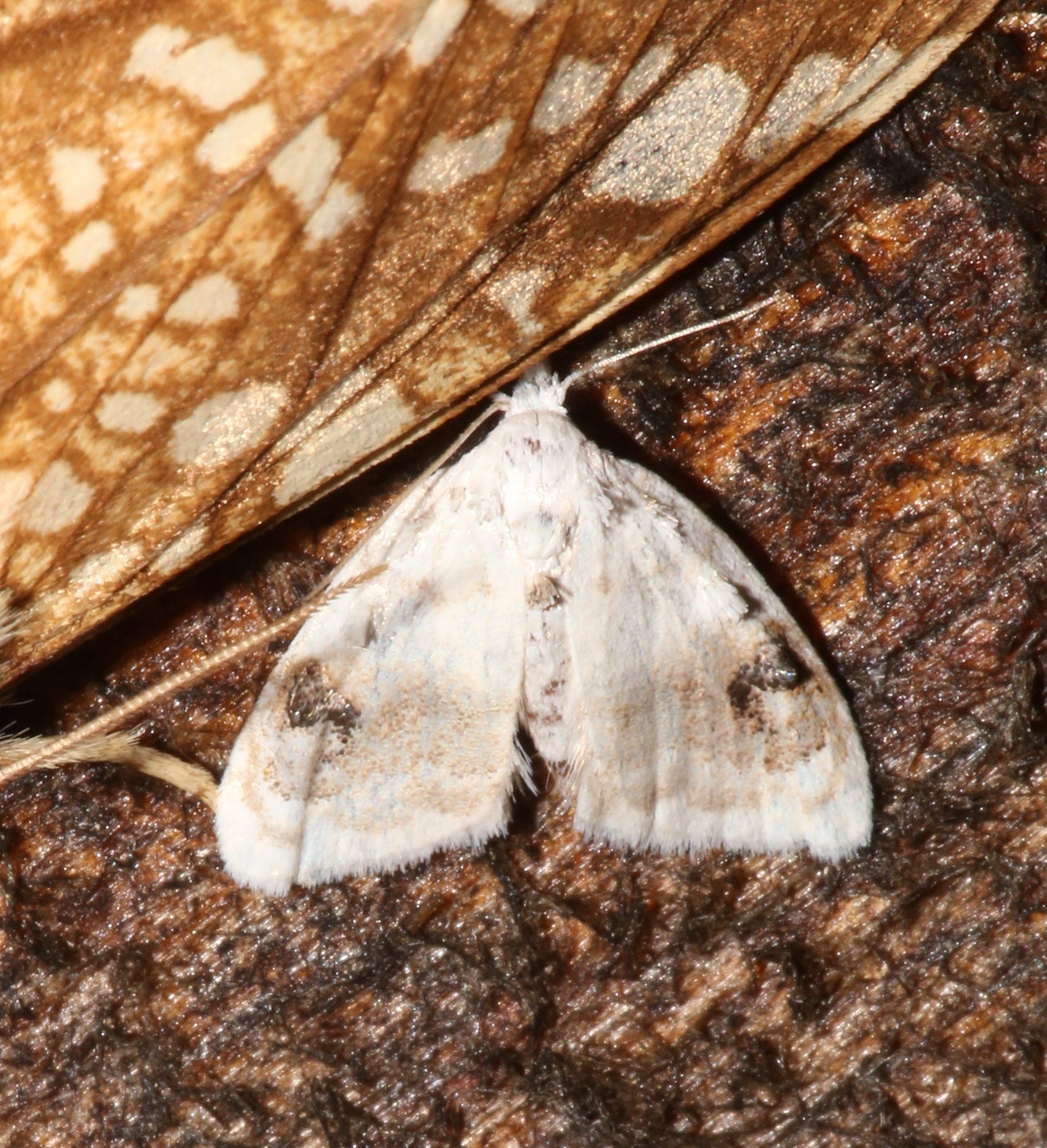
- Image of a Blurry-patched Nola moth

Scientific classification
- Kingdom: Animalia
- Phylum: Arthropoda
- Class: Insecta
- Order: Lepidoptera
- Superfamily: Noctuoidea
- Family: Nolidae
- Genus: Nola
- Species: N. cilicoides

Binomial name
- Nola cilicoides (Grote, 1873)

= Nola cilicoides =

Species of moth

Nola cilicoides, the blurry-patched nola moth, is a species of nolid moth in the family Nolidae.

The MONA or Hodges number for Nola cilicoides is 8990.
