= Nola ceylonica =

Scientific classification
- Kingdom: Animalia
- Phylum: Arthropoda
- Class: Insecta
- Order: Lepidoptera
- Superfamily: Noctuoidea
- Family: Nolidae
- Genus: Nola
- Species: N. ceylonica

Binomial name
- Nola ceylonica Hampson, 1893

Synonyms
- Nola ameleta Wileman & West, 1928 (synonymized by László et al. 2014); Nola kimurai Yazaki, 1995

Species of moth

Nola ceylonica is a moth of the family Nolidae first described by George Hampson in 1893. It is found in Sri Lanka.
