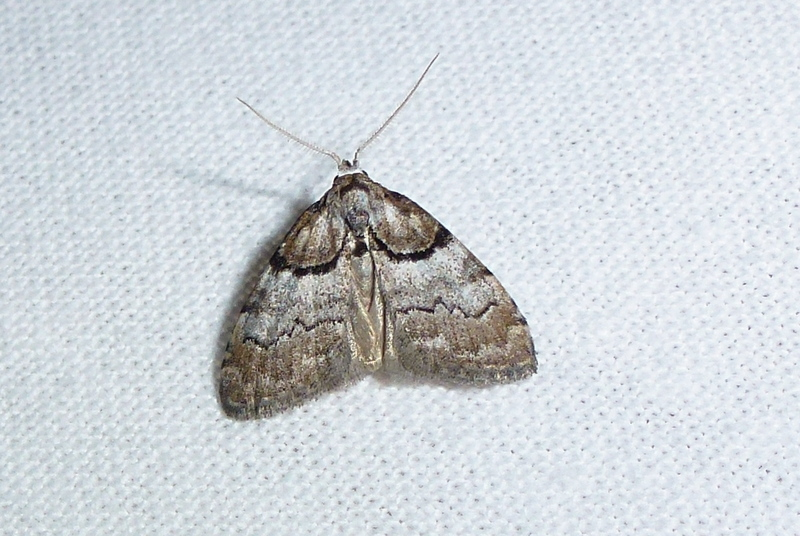

Scientific classification
- Kingdom: Animalia
- Phylum: Arthropoda
- Class: Insecta
- Order: Lepidoptera
- Superfamily: Noctuoidea
- Family: Nolidae
- Genus: Nola
- Species: N. cucullatella

Binomial name
- Nola cucullatella (Linnaeus, 1758)

= Short-cloaked moth =

Species of moth

The short-cloaked moth (Nola cucullatella) is a moth of the family Nolidae. It is distributed through most of Europe. It was collected in 2008 in the greater Vancouver area of British Columbia (Westham Island). Vancouver is a major shipping port, and is the most probable source area of the introduction

This is a small species (wingspan 15–20 mm) with grey or brown forewings with black basal areas which resemble a short cloak when the moth is at rest. The hindwings are uniform cream or grey. It flies at night in June and July and is attracted to light. The slightly hairy larva is reddish-brown with white marks along the back. It feeds on various rosaceous plants including apple, Cotoneaster, hawthorn, pear, Prunus, rowan and whitebeam. The species overwinters as a small larva.

1. The flight season refers to the British Isles. This may vary in other parts of the range.
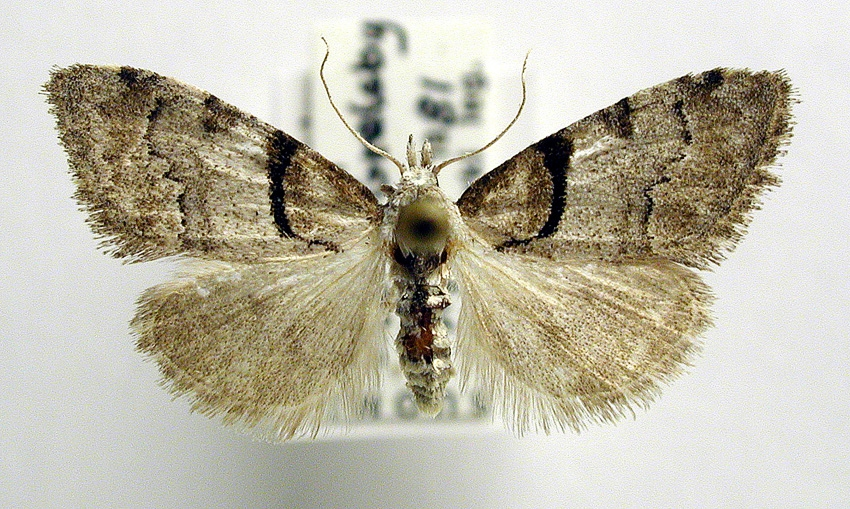

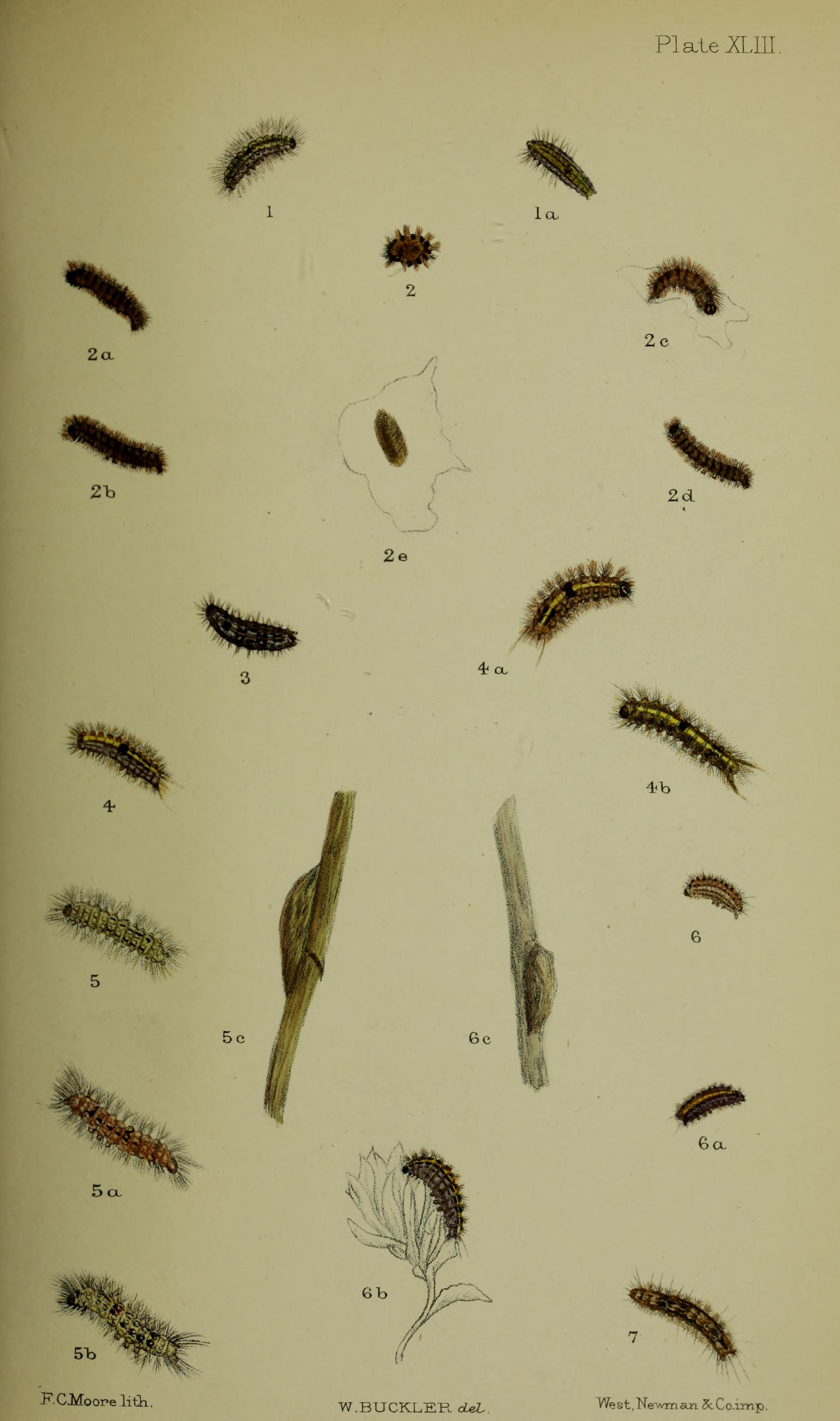
Fig. 3 larvae after last moult

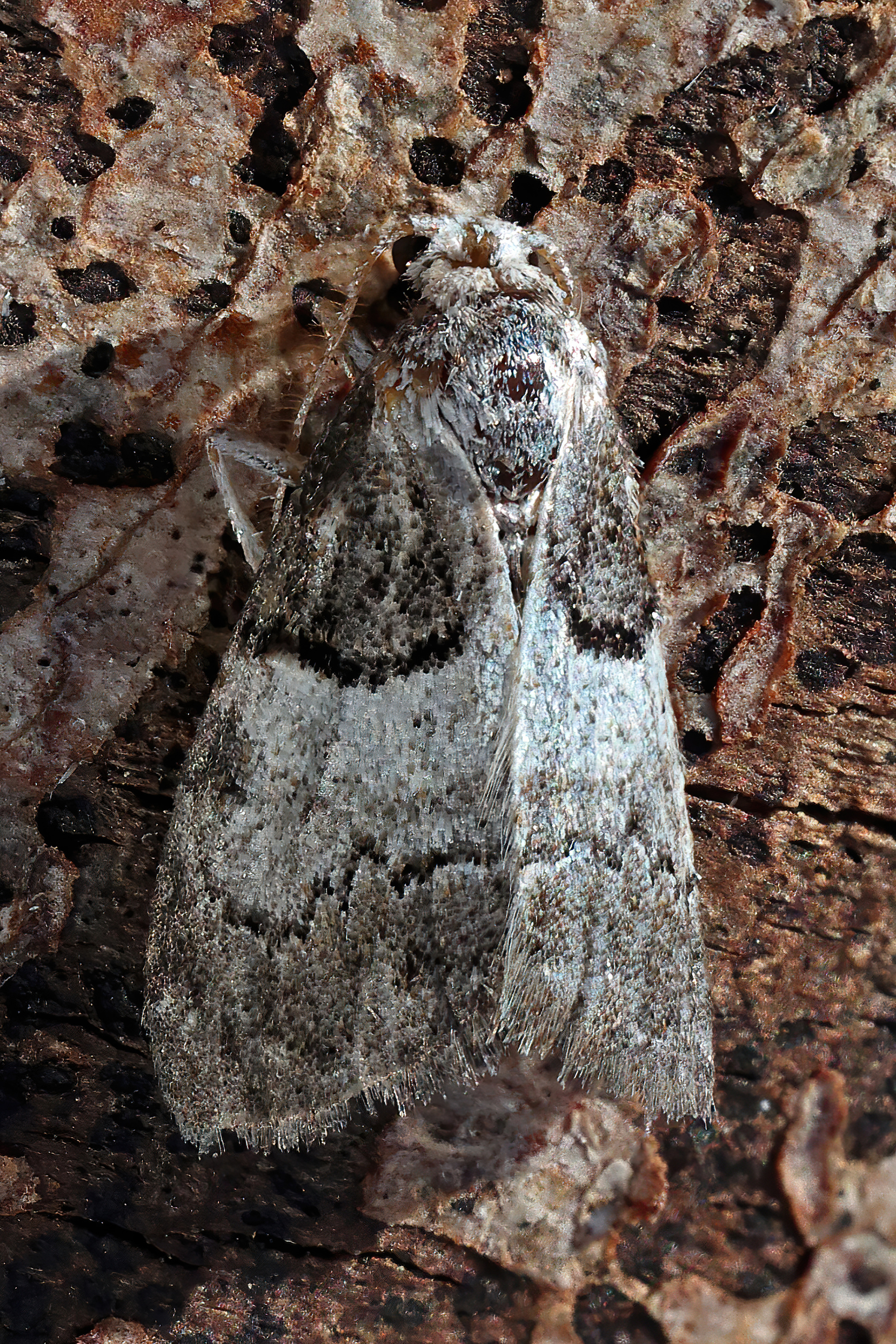
with closed wings
