= Nola angulata =

Scientific classification
- Domain: Eukaryota
- Kingdom: Animalia
- Phylum: Arthropoda
- Class: Insecta
- Order: Lepidoptera
- Superfamily: Noctuoidea
- Family: Nolidae
- Genus: Nola
- Species: N. angulata

Binomial name
- Nola angulata (Moore, 1888)

Synonyms
- Roeselia angulata Moore, 1888; Celama angulata Hampson, 1900

Species of moth

Nola angulata is a moth of the family Nolidae first described by Frederic Moore in 1888. It is found in India and Sri Lanka.
