= Nola pascua =

Scientific classification
- Domain: Eukaryota
- Kingdom: Animalia
- Phylum: Arthropoda
- Class: Insecta
- Order: Lepidoptera
- Superfamily: Noctuoidea
- Family: Nolidae
- Genus: Nola
- Species: N. pascua

Binomial name
- Nola pascua (C. Swinhoe, 1885)

Synonyms
- Celama pascua C. Swinhoe, 1885; Roeselia pascua C. Swinhoe, 1885

Species of moth

Nola pascua is a moth of the family Nolidae first described by Charles Swinhoe in 1885. It is found in India, Myanmar and Sri Lanka.

== Description ==
The moth belongs to a complex group called internella group taxonomically, until Hampson made pascua and quadrimaculata as synonyms of internella. In 1928 Wileman and West identified that analis is different from pascua. However, all three species very closely resemble each other externally. Inspection of the genitals is needed to identify the species.
