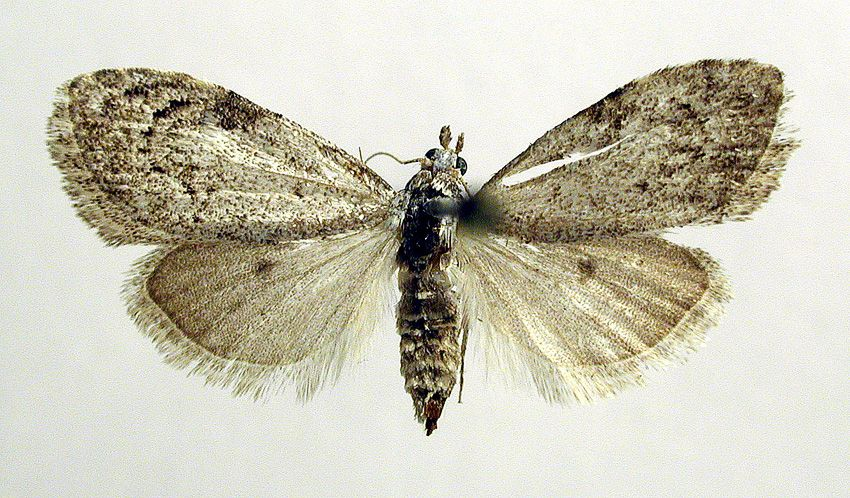

Scientific classification
- Domain: Eukaryota
- Kingdom: Animalia
- Phylum: Arthropoda
- Class: Insecta
- Order: Lepidoptera
- Superfamily: Noctuoidea
- Family: Nolidae
- Genus: Nola
- Species: N. confusalis

Binomial name
- Nola confusalis (Herrich-Schäffer, 1847)

Synonyms
- Roeselia confusalis Herrich-Schäffer, [1851]; Celama confusalis

= Nola confusalis =

Species of moth

Nola confusalis, the least black arches, is a moth of the family Nolidae. It is found in most of Europe, east to eastern Asia and Japan.

The wingspan is 16–18 mm. Adults are on wing from mid April to mid June in one generation in western Europe.

The larvae mainly feed on various deciduous trees and bushes, including lime (Tilia species) and evergreen oak (Quercus ilex). Larvae can be found from June to August.
