= Nola rufa =

Scientific classification
- Kingdom: Animalia
- Phylum: Arthropoda
- Class: Insecta
- Order: Lepidoptera
- Superfamily: Noctuoidea
- Family: Nolidae
- Genus: Nola
- Species: N. rufa

Binomial name
- Nola rufa (Hampson, 1900)

Synonyms
- Celama rufa (Hampson, 1900

Species of moth

Nola rufa is a moth of the family Nolidae first described by George Hampson in 1900. It is found in Sri Lanka.
