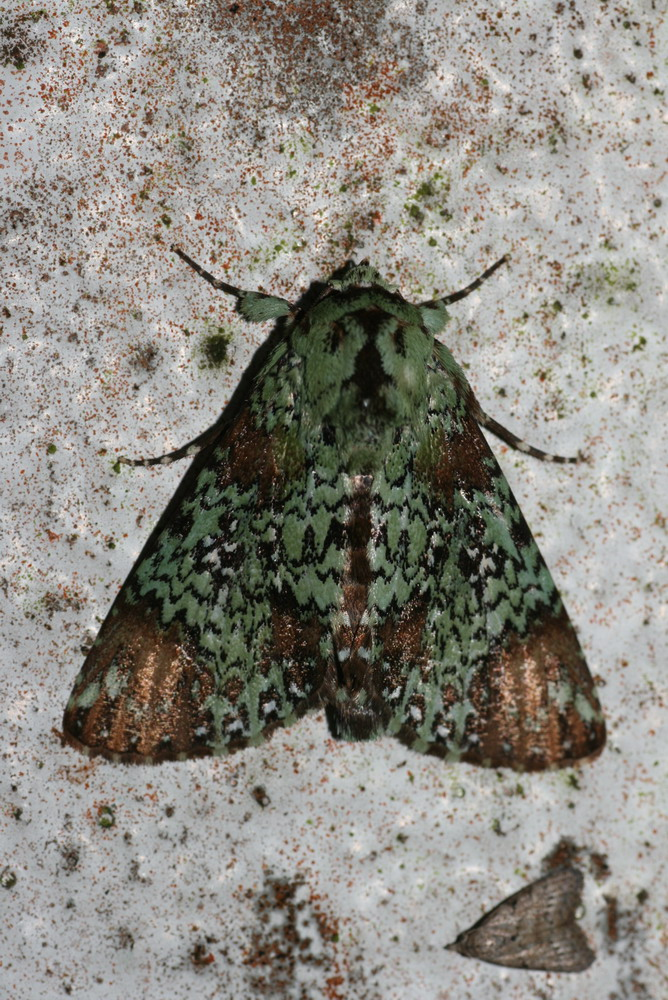
- Donda eurychlora (top) and Nola pumila (bottom)

Scientific classification
- Kingdom: Animalia
- Phylum: Arthropoda
- Class: Insecta
- Order: Lepidoptera
- Superfamily: Noctuoidea
- Family: Nolidae
- Genus: Nola
- Species: N. pumila

Binomial name
- Nola pumila Snellen, 1875

Synonyms
- Nola spreta Butler, 1880; Sorocostia tetrophthalma Meyrick, 1889; Nola minuta Hampson, 1891; Nola hampsoni Kirby, 1892; Celama pumila

= Nola pumila =

Species of moth

Nola pumila is a moth of the family Nolidae. It is found in the Indo-Australian tropics, including China (Shanghai), Formosa, Sikkim, Assam, India, Burma, Sulawesi and New Guinea.

The larvae feed on fruits of Shorea species and possibly the flowers of Dryobalanops species, although this might refer to a related species.
