= Nola minna =

Scientific classification
- Domain: Eukaryota
- Kingdom: Animalia
- Phylum: Arthropoda
- Class: Insecta
- Order: Lepidoptera
- Superfamily: Noctuoidea
- Family: Nolidae
- Genus: Nola
- Species: N. minna

Binomial name
- Nola minna Butler, 1881

Species of moth

Nola minna, the ceanothus nola moth, is a species of nolid moth in the family Nolidae. It is found in North America.

The MONA or Hodges number for Nola minna is 8993.
