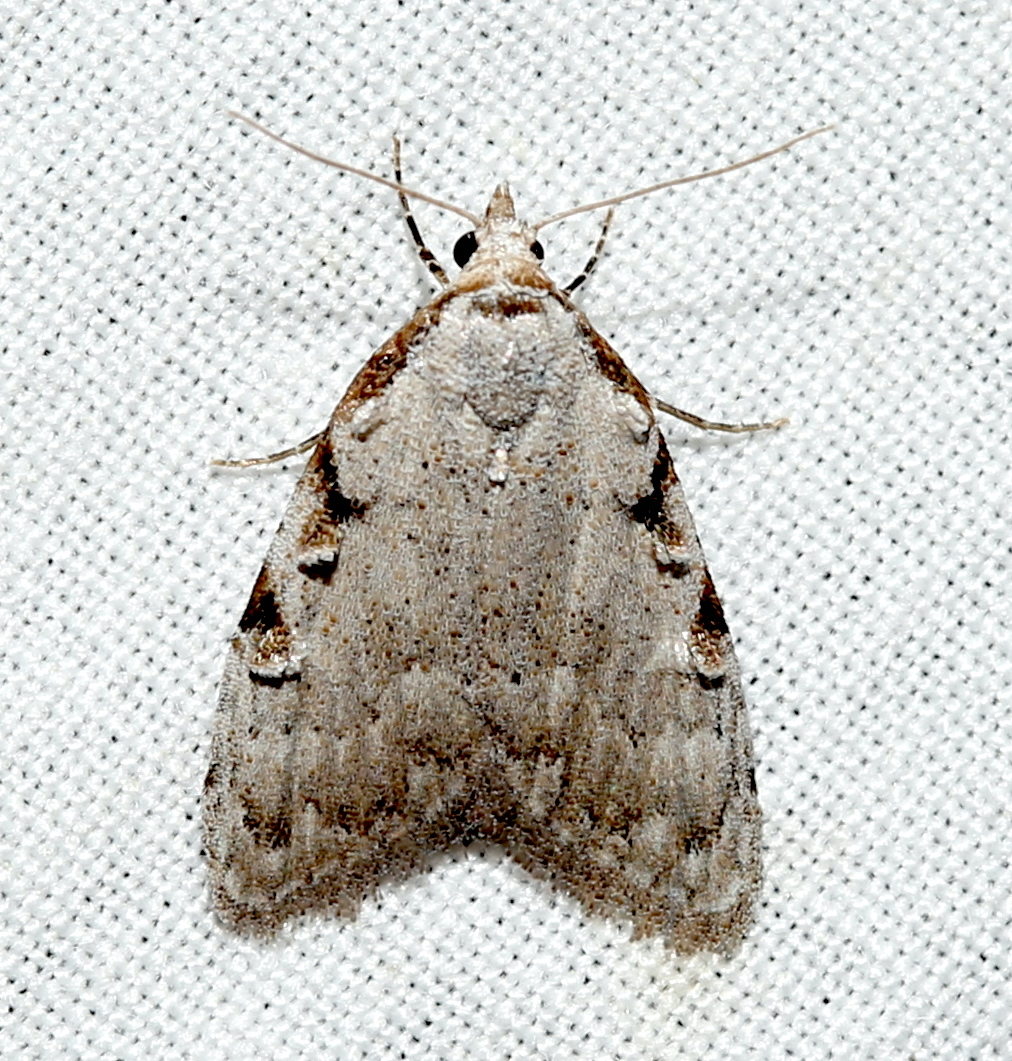

Scientific classification
- Kingdom: Animalia
- Phylum: Arthropoda
- Class: Insecta
- Order: Lepidoptera
- Superfamily: Noctuoidea
- Family: Nolidae
- Genus: Nola
- Species: N. triquetrana

Binomial name
- Nola triquetrana (Fitch, 1856)

= Nola triquetrana =

Species of moth

Nola triquetrana, the three-spotted nola, is a species of nolid moth in the family Nolidae.

The MONA or Hodges number for Nola triquetrana is 8992.
