= Nola squalida =

Scientific classification
- Domain: Eukaryota
- Kingdom: Animalia
- Phylum: Arthropoda
- Class: Insecta
- Order: Lepidoptera
- Superfamily: Noctuoidea
- Family: Nolidae
- Genus: Nola
- Species: N. squalida

Binomial name
- Nola squalida (Staudinger, 1870)

Synonyms
- Celama squalida Staudinger, 1870; Nola musculalis Saalmüller, 1880; Nola turanica Staudinger, 1887; Nola van hasseltii Heylaerts, 1892; Nola vanhasselti Heylaerts, 1892; Nola ceylonica Hampson, 1893; Manoba grisescens Rothschild, 1912; Nola parvula Chrétien, 1913; Celama mesoscia Hampson, 1914; Celama henrioti Warnecke, 1937; Celama turanica minima Warnecke, 1938; Nola priesneri Rebel, 1938; Nola turanica Grum-Grshimailo, 1890

Species of moth

Nola squalida is a moth of the family Nolidae first described by Otto Staudinger in 1870. It is found in Turkestan, Himalaya, Sikkim, Bhutan, China, India and Sri Lanka.
