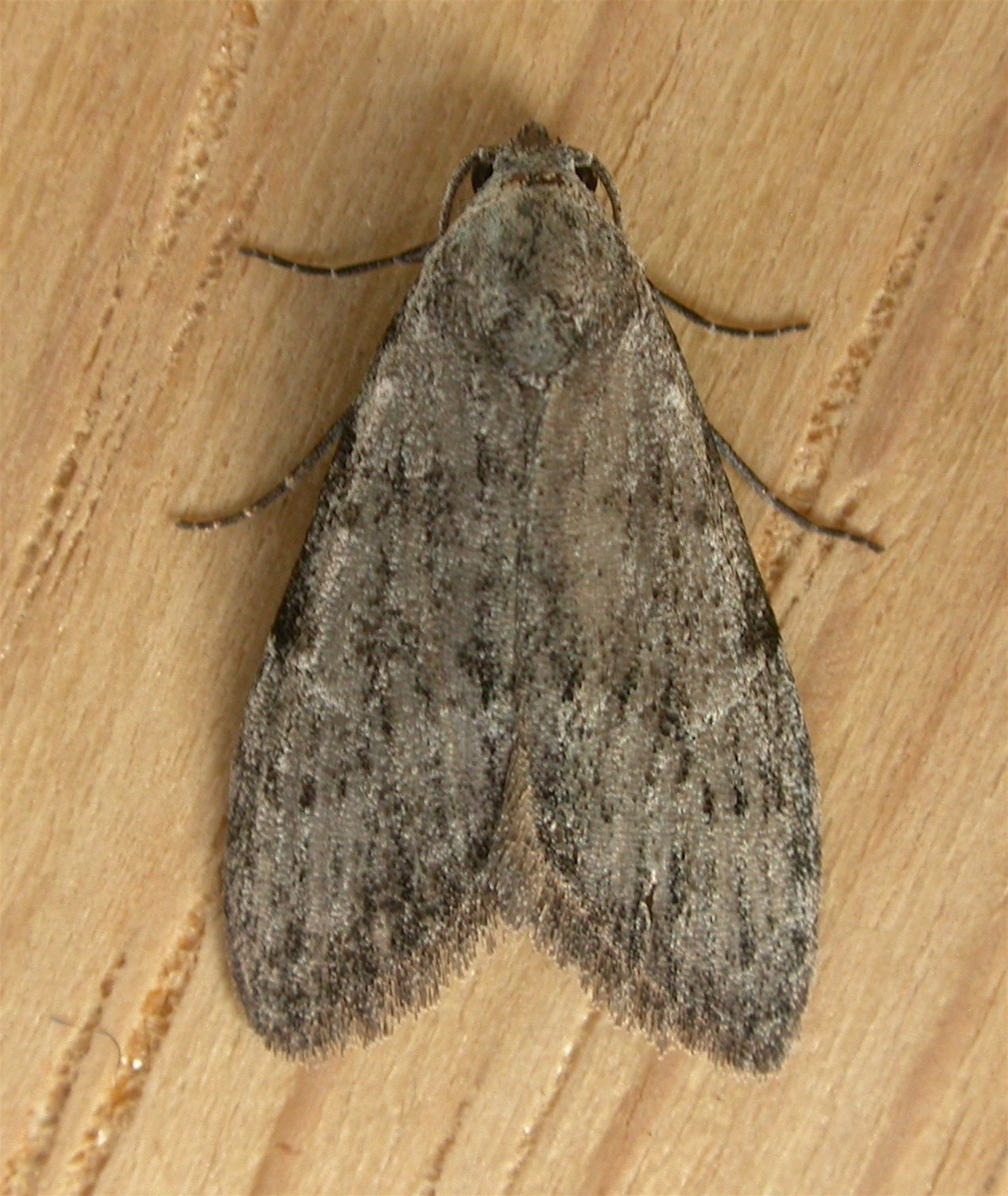

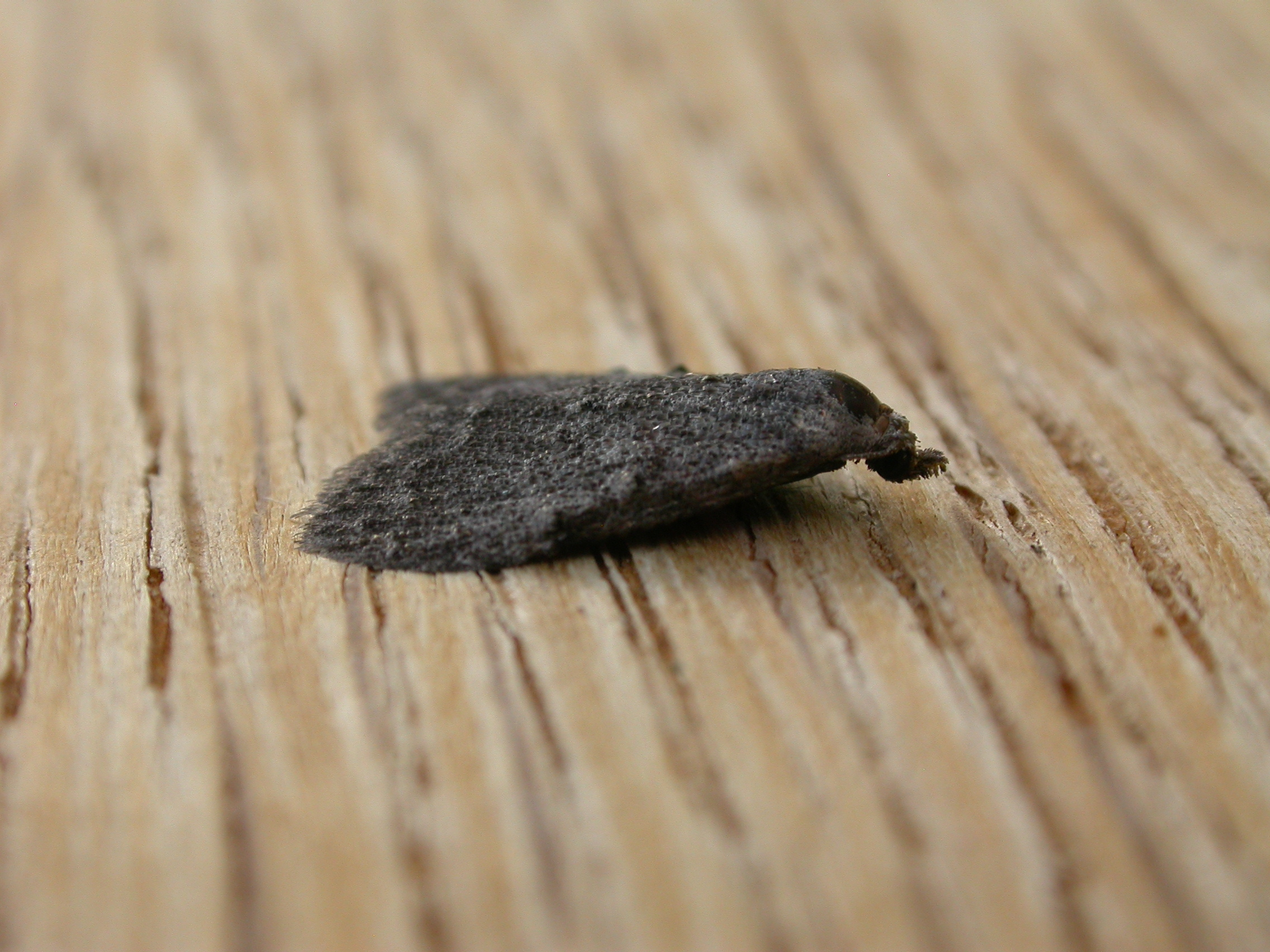

Scientific classification
- Kingdom: Animalia
- Phylum: Arthropoda
- Class: Insecta
- Order: Lepidoptera
- Superfamily: Noctuoidea
- Family: Nolidae
- Genus: Nola
- Species: N. pleurosema

Binomial name
- Nola pleurosema Turner, 1944

Synonyms
- Celama pleurosema

= Nola pleurosema =

Species of moth

Nola pleurosema is a moth of the family Nolidae. It is found in Australia.
