= Nola cingalesa =

Scientific classification
- Domain: Eukaryota
- Kingdom: Animalia
- Phylum: Arthropoda
- Class: Insecta
- Order: Lepidoptera
- Superfamily: Noctuoidea
- Family: Nolidae
- Genus: Nola
- Species: N. cingalesa

Binomial name
- Nola cingalesa Moore, [1882]

Synonyms
- Raeselia [sic] culaca C. Swinhoe, 1891; Celama cingalesa Hampson, 1900

Species of moth

Nola cingalesa is a moth of the family Nolidae first described by Frederic Moore in 1882. It is found in Sri Lanka.
