= Nola leucoscopula =

Scientific classification
- Kingdom: Animalia
- Phylum: Arthropoda
- Class: Insecta
- Order: Lepidoptera
- Superfamily: Noctuoidea
- Family: Nolidae
- Genus: Nola
- Species: N. leucoscopula

Binomial name
- Nola leucoscopula (Hampson, 1907)

Synonyms
- Celama leucoscopula Hampson, 1907

Species of moth

Nola leucoscopula is a moth of the family Nolidae first described by George Hampson in 1907. It is found in Sri Lanka.
