= Nola dentilinea =

Scientific classification
- Kingdom: Animalia
- Phylum: Arthropoda
- Class: Insecta
- Order: Lepidoptera
- Superfamily: Noctuoidea
- Family: Nolidae
- Genus: Nola
- Species: N. dentilinea

Binomial name
- Nola dentilinea (Hampson, 1909)

Synonyms
- Celama dentilinea Hampson, 1909

Species of moth

Nola dentilinea is a moth of the family Nolidae first described by George Hampson in 1909. It is found in Sri Lanka.
