= Nola geminata =

Scientific classification
- Kingdom: Animalia
- Phylum: Arthropoda
- Class: Insecta
- Order: Lepidoptera
- Superfamily: Noctuoidea
- Family: Nolidae
- Genus: Nola
- Species: N. geminata

Binomial name
- Nola geminata (Mabille, 1899)

Synonyms
- Celama geminata Mabille, 1899

Species of moth

Nola geminata is a moth in the family Nolidae. It was described by Paul Mabille in 1899. It is found on Madagascar.
