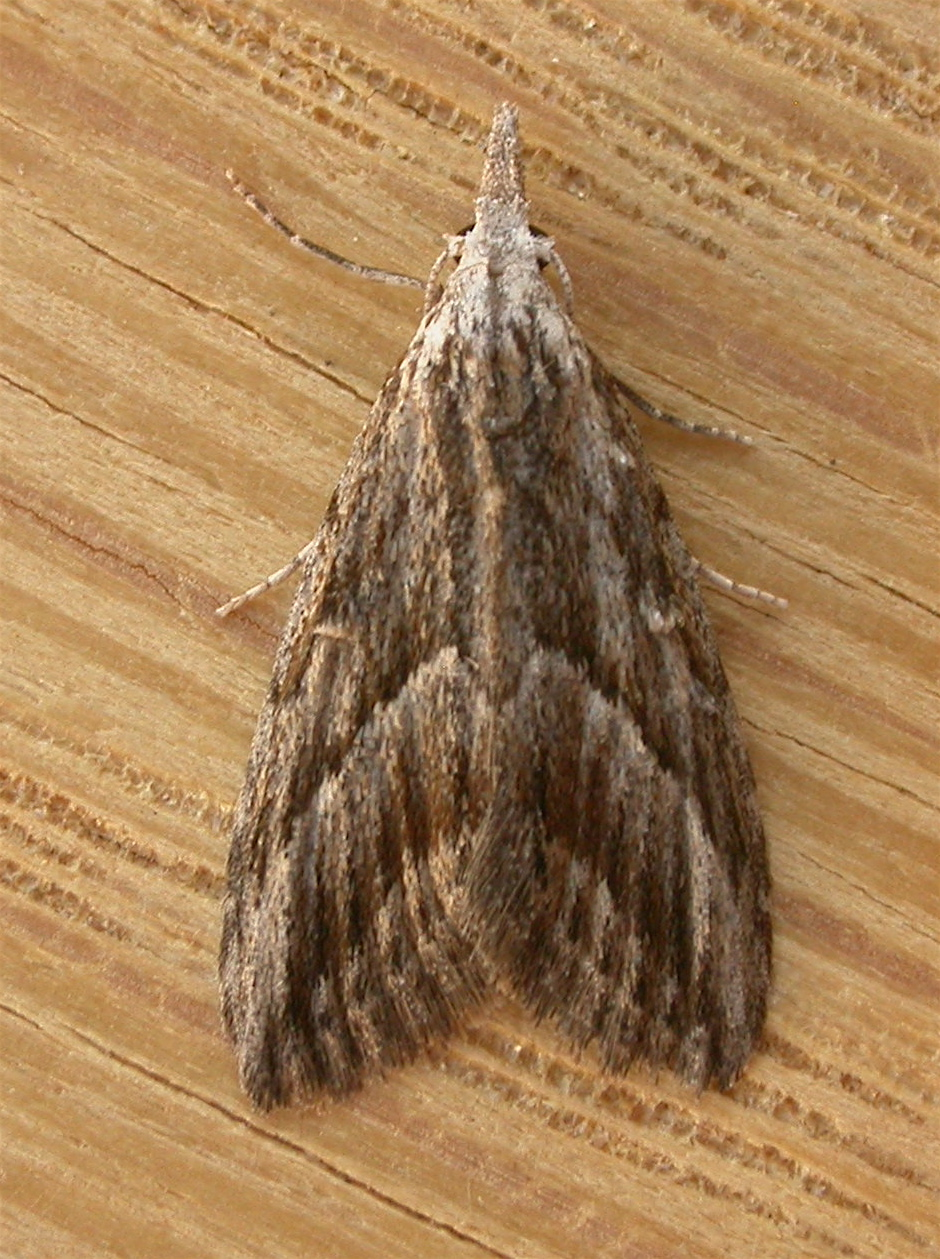

Scientific classification
- Kingdom: Animalia
- Phylum: Arthropoda
- Class: Insecta
- Order: Lepidoptera
- Superfamily: Noctuoidea
- Family: Nolidae
- Genus: Nola
- Species: N. phaeogramma

Binomial name
- Nola phaeogramma Turner, 1944

Synonyms
- Celama phaeogramma

= Nola phaeogramma =

Species of moth

Nola phaeogramma is a moth of the family Nolidae. It found in Australia.
