= Nola fuscibasalis =

Scientific classification
- Kingdom: Animalia
- Phylum: Arthropoda
- Class: Insecta
- Order: Lepidoptera
- Superfamily: Noctuoidea
- Family: Nolidae
- Genus: Nola
- Species: N. fuscibasalis

Binomial name
- Nola fuscibasalis (Hampson, 1896)

Synonyms
- Pisara fuscibasalis Hampson, 1896

Species of moth

Nola fuscibasalis is a moth of the family Nolidae first described by George Hampson in 1896. It is found in Sri Lanka and Myanmar.

== Description ==
Its larval food plant is Ziziphus mauritiana.
