= Nola lucidalis =

Scientific classification
- Kingdom: Animalia
- Phylum: Arthropoda
- Clade: Pancrustacea
- Class: Insecta
- Order: Lepidoptera
- Superfamily: Noctuoidea
- Family: Nolidae
- Genus: Nola
- Species: N. lucidalis

Binomial name
- Nola lucidalis (Walker, 1864)

Synonyms
- Celama lucidalis Walker, 1864; Pisara? lucidalis Walker, 1864; Nola dimidiata Snellen, 1875; Celama nephodes Hampson, 1914

Species of moth

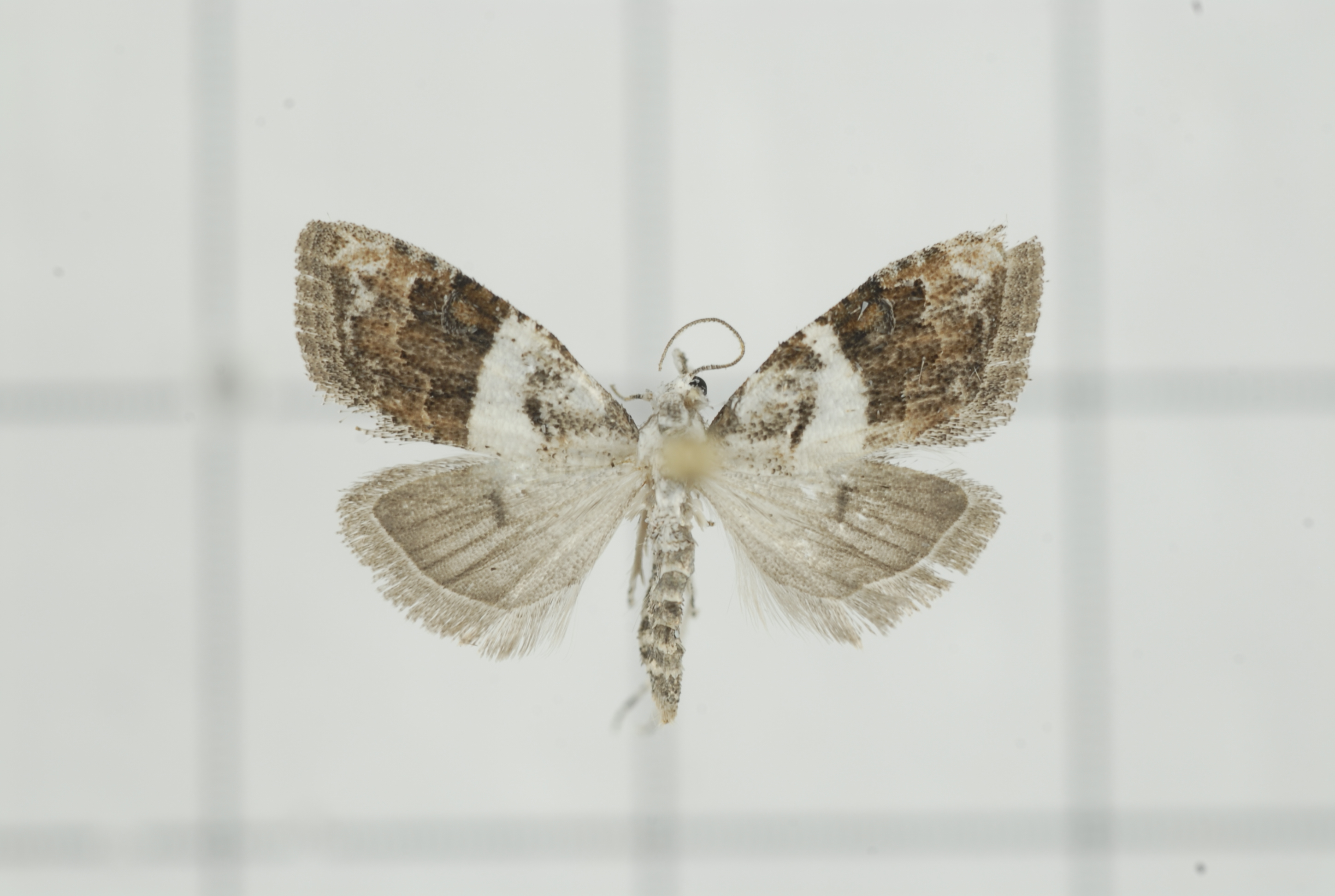
Nola nephodes specimen

Nola lucidalis is a moth of the family Nolidae first described by Francis Walker in 1864. It is found in the Indian subregion, Sri Lanka, Borneo, Java, the Philippines and Taiwan.
