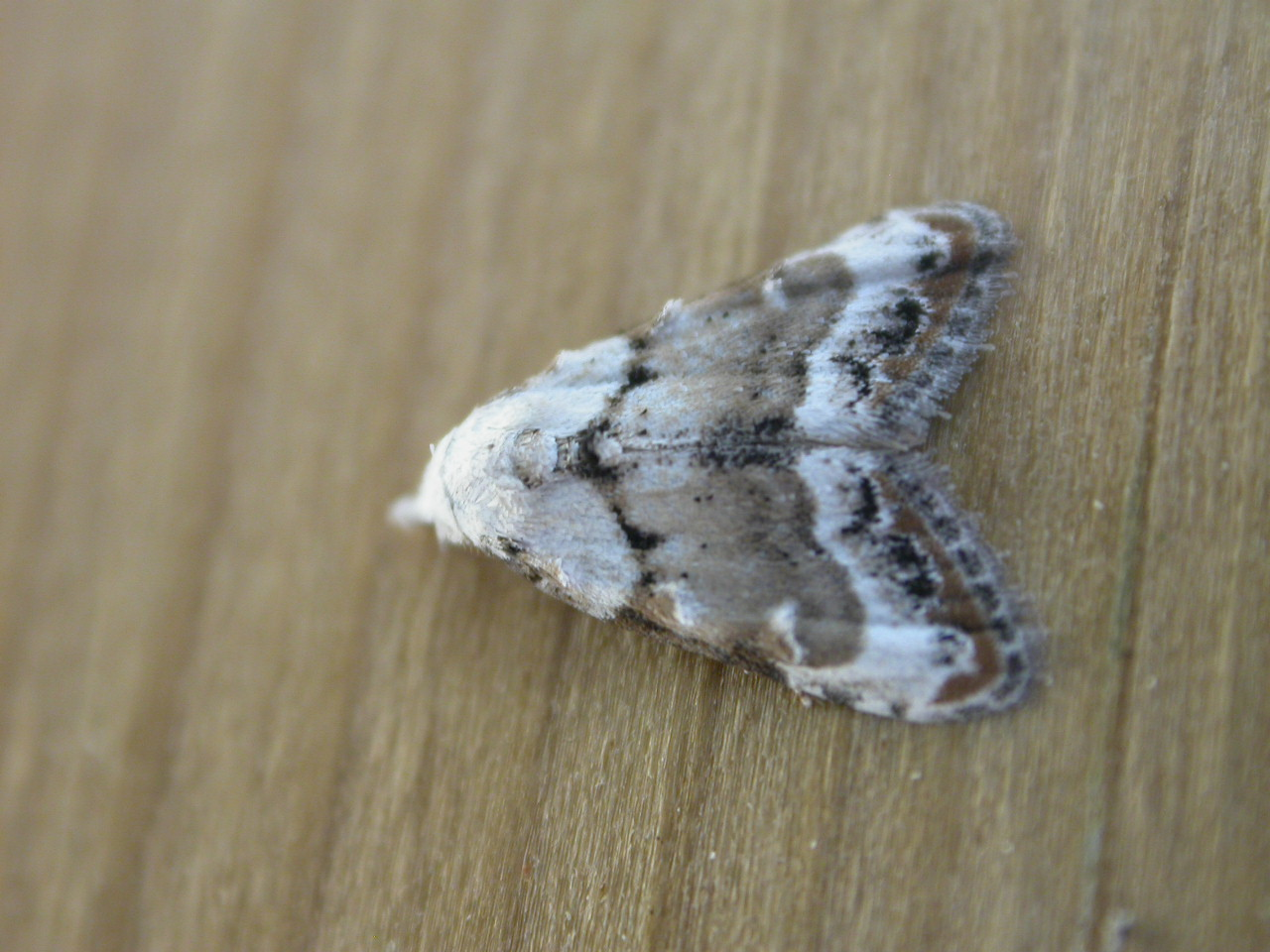

Scientific classification
- Kingdom: Animalia
- Phylum: Arthropoda
- Class: Insecta
- Order: Lepidoptera
- Superfamily: Noctuoidea
- Family: Nolidae
- Genus: Nola
- Species: N. subchlamydula

Binomial name
- Nola subchlamydula Staudinger, 1871

= Nola subchlamydula =

Species of moth

Nola subchlamydula is a moth of the family Nolidae. It is found in North Africa and Southern and South-Eastern Europe.

The wingspan is 17–19 mm.

The larvae feed on Teucrium chamaedrys, Salvia and Lavandula stoechas.
