= Nola juvenis =

Scientific classification
- Domain: Eukaryota
- Kingdom: Animalia
- Phylum: Arthropoda
- Class: Insecta
- Order: Lepidoptera
- Superfamily: Noctuoidea
- Family: Nolidae
- Genus: Nola
- Species: N. juvenis

Binomial name
- Nola juvenis (Holland, 1893)

Synonyms
- Nudaria juvenis Holland, 1893

Species of moth

Nola juvenis is a moth in the family Nolidae. It was described by William Jacob Holland in 1893. It is found in Gabon.
