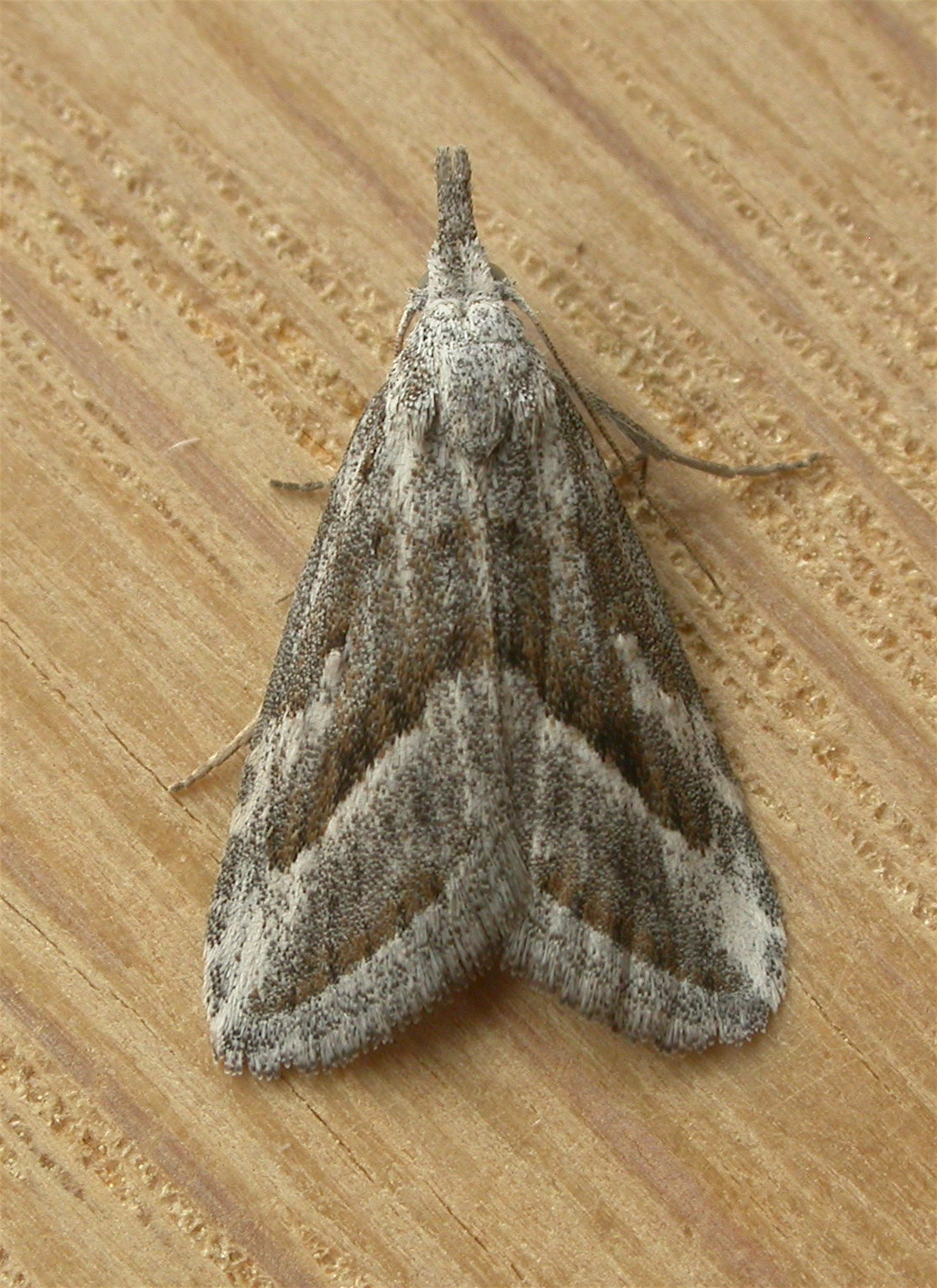

Scientific classification
- Kingdom: Animalia
- Phylum: Arthropoda
- Clade: Pancrustacea
- Class: Insecta
- Order: Lepidoptera
- Superfamily: Noctuoidea
- Family: Nolidae
- Genus: Nola
- Species: N. paromoea

Binomial name
- Nola paromoea Meyrick, 1886

Synonyms
- Sorocostia paromoea; Celama paromoea

= Nola paromoea =

Species of moth

Nola paromoea is a moth of the family Nolidae. It is found in southern, eastern, and southwestern Australia.

The wingspan is about 15 mm (0.59 in).
