= Nola analis =

Scientific classification
- Domain: Eukaryota
- Kingdom: Animalia
- Phylum: Arthropoda
- Class: Insecta
- Order: Lepidoptera
- Superfamily: Noctuoidea
- Family: Nolidae
- Genus: Nola
- Species: N. analis

Binomial name
- Nola analis (Wileman & West, 1928)

Synonyms
- Celama analis Wileman & West, 1928

Species of moth

Nola analis is a moth of the family Nolidae first described by Wileman and West in 1928. It is found in India, Sri Lanka and Hong Kong.

== Description ==
The moth belongs to a complex group called internella group taxonomically, until Hampson made pascua and quadrimaculata as synonyms of internella. In 1928 Wileman and West identified that analis is a separate species different pascua. However, all three species very closely resemble each other externally. Observation of the genitals is necessary to differentiate Nola analis from N. quadrimaculata.

The male has yellowish hindwings, brownish hair-pencils and patches are associated with dorsum. A hair-pencil is enfolded in the dorsum. In tornus, underside has brownish scales. An irregular tri-arcuate submarginal present which defined sharply the darker distal area from paler basal area. Dark brownish raised scales are present on costa medially and antemedially. The caterpillar has a light yellowish body with a purplish band that runs laterally. Head glossy pale orange. However, some yellow and black variants can be observed with orange verrucae and green ventrum. Others are brownish black with yellowish-white marbling, and purple, orange and white verrucae. Lateral verrucae yellowish. Dorsal verrucae orange to white and black. A trapezium-shaped purple dorsal patch is found at A8. Secondary setae are present and are light grayish to translucent.

== Ecology ==
The caterpillars are restless and feed on flowers. Early instars are highly hairy, causing them to be easily blown away by the wind. Pupation occurs in a triangular cocoon. Pupa lack a cremaster and have blunt ends. Larval food plants are Memecylon, Terminalia and Lantana camara. Plants in the following genera are hosts for N. analis, N. internella and N. quadrimaculata: Mangifera, Durio, Ricinus, Pennisetum (seeds), Sorghum, Acacia, Cajanus (seeds), Nephelium.

Timeline of the species' life cycle:

- Life span of egg = 2–3 days
- Life span of larval stages = 15 days
- Life span of pupal stage = 7–8 days
- Life span of adult male = 3–4 days
- Life span of adult female = 8 days
