= Nola rufimixta =

Scientific classification
- Kingdom: Animalia
- Phylum: Arthropoda
- Class: Insecta
- Order: Lepidoptera
- Superfamily: Noctuoidea
- Family: Nolidae
- Genus: Nola
- Species: N. rufimixta

Binomial name
- Nola rufimixta (Hampson, 1909)

Synonyms
- Celama rufimixta Hampson, 1909

Species of moth

Nola rufimixta is a moth of the family Nolidae first described by George Hampson in 1909. It is found in India and Sri Lanka.

== Description ==
The male's antennae are fasciculate (bundled). Its forewings are a mottled pale dull brown. The brown antemedial line is double. Three plates of raised scales are found along the forewing costa.
