= Nola flavicosta =

Scientific classification
- Kingdom: Animalia
- Phylum: Arthropoda
- Class: Insecta
- Order: Lepidoptera
- Superfamily: Noctuoidea
- Family: Nolidae
- Genus: Nola
- Species: N. flavicosta

Binomial name
- Nola flavicosta (Kiriakoff, 1958)

Synonyms
- Manoba flavicosta Kiriakoff, 1958

Species of moth

Nola flavicosta is a moth in the family Nolidae. It was described by Sergius Kiriakoff in 1958. It is found in Uganda.
