= Nola involuta =

Scientific classification
- Domain: Eukaryota
- Kingdom: Animalia
- Phylum: Arthropoda
- Class: Insecta
- Order: Lepidoptera
- Superfamily: Noctuoidea
- Family: Nolidae
- Genus: Nola
- Species: N. involuta

Binomial name
- Nola involuta Dyar, 1898

Synonyms
- Nola exposita Dyar, 1898; Celama aphyla Hampson, 1900; Nola aphyla

Species of moth

Nola involuta is a moth of the family Nolidae first described by Harrison Gray Dyar Jr. in 1898. It was described from California and occurs from southern California to southern Texas. It is consistently different in wing markings from Nola apera to which it has been placed as a synonym.
