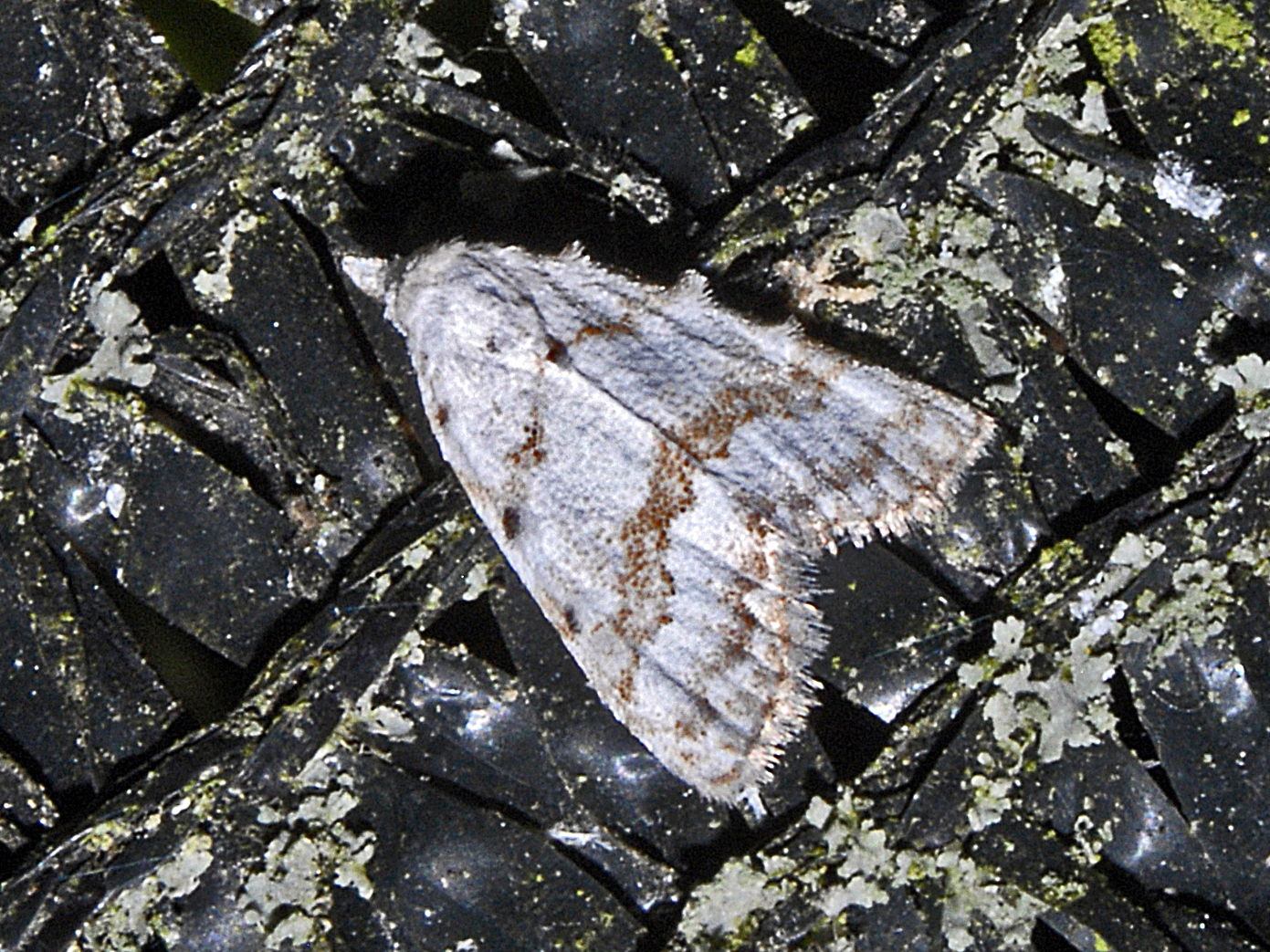
- Adult

Scientific classification
- Domain: Eukaryota
- Kingdom: Animalia
- Phylum: Arthropoda
- Class: Insecta
- Order: Lepidoptera
- Superfamily: Noctuoidea
- Family: Nolidae
- Genus: Nola
- Species: N. aerugula

Binomial name
- Nola aerugula (Hübner, 1793)

Synonyms
- List: Phalaena aerugula Hübner, 1793; Pyralis centonalis Hübner, 1796; Roeselia centonana Hübner, [1825]; Glaphyra atomosa Bremer, 1861; Celama centonalis (Hübner, 1796); Nola candidalis Staudinger, 1892; Nola impudica Christoph, 1893; Nola littoralis Paux, 1901

= Nola aerugula =

Species of moth

Nola aerugula, the scarce black arches, is a moth of the family Nolidae found in Asia and Europe. The species was first described by the German entomologist, Jacob Hübner in 1793.

== Subspecies ==
- Nola aerugula aerugula
- Nola aerugula holsatica Sauber, 1916 (Denmark, the Netherlands) – many authors consider holsatica to be a full species.

== Description ==
The wingspan is 15–20 mm. These small drab moths show quite variable colors and patterns. The basic color may be gray, brownish or almost white, with brown transverse bands. There are also bright and dark specimens with high-contrast patterns. Forewings are almost triangular with a rounded basal area. The rear wings are gray or brownish. The body is cylindrical. The antennas are filamentous, about half as long as forewings.

=== Biology ===
Adults are on wing from June to August in one generation. Males begin to fly just before sunset, and can sometimes be seen in swarms in search of females. The larvae mainly feed on clover (Trifolium) and common bird's-foot trefoil (Lotus corniculatus), but also birch (Betula species), willow (Salix species) and poplar (Populus species). The larvae of ssp. holsatica feed on petty whin (Genista anglica) and hairy greenweed (Genista pilosa). Larvae overwinter, and can be found from August to June.

=== Habitat ===
This species lives on sandy areas and peatlands.

== Distribution ==
This species can be found in most of Europe, east to eastern Asia and Japan. A former resident in Kent it is nowadays a rare migrant to Great Britain.

== Taxonomy ==
In 1793, Hübner placed the moth in the obsolete genus Phalaena, which was raised by Carl Linnaeus to house most of the moths. The English zoologist William Elford Leach Leach raised the genus Nola in 1815 and placed it in the Tortricidae family. The genus is possibly named after the town in Campania, Italy. This was one of the earliest examples of using a place for the name of a genus, although he did not give an explanation as to why he chose Nola. It was one of the earliest examples of using a place for the name of a genus. Hübner named the moth aerugula from aerugo – the rust of copper. There is no trace of green colouration and the intended meaning is probably 'coppery' – referring to the pale brown colour on the forewing.

== Gallery ==
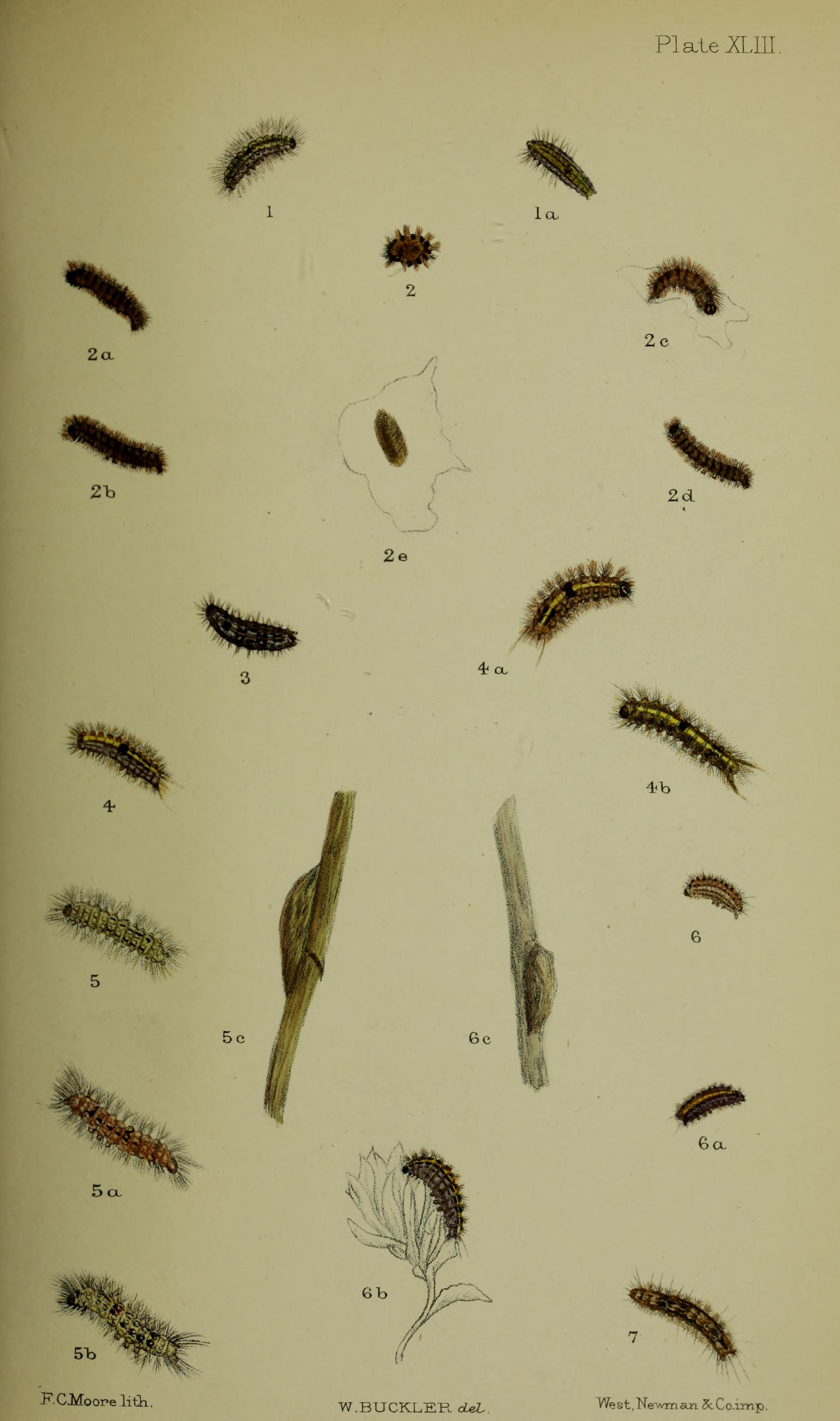
Figs. Fig. 6, 6a larvae before last moult 6b, 7 larvae after last moult 6c cocoon attached to a stem

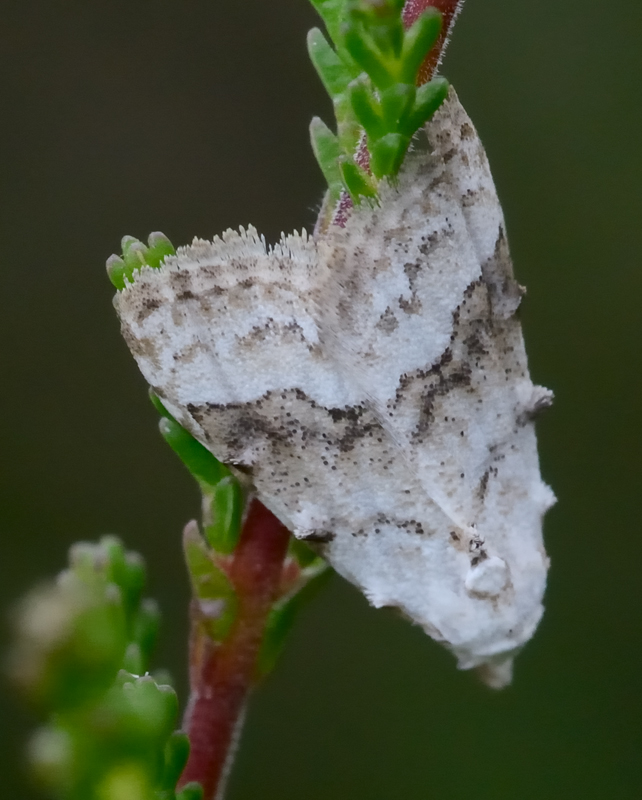
Moth

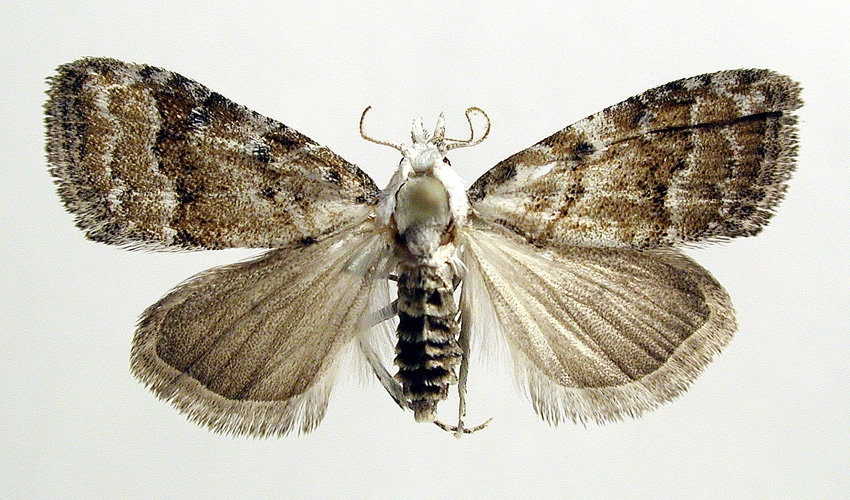
Mounted specimen
