= Nola okanoi =

Scientific classification
- Kingdom: Animalia
- Phylum: Arthropoda
- Clade: Pancrustacea
- Class: Insecta
- Order: Lepidoptera
- Superfamily: Noctuoidea
- Family: Nolidae
- Genus: Nola
- Species: N. okanoi

Binomial name
- Nola okanoi (Inoue, 1958)

Synonyms
- Celama okanoi Inoue, 1958

Species of moth

Nola okanoi is a moth in the family Nolidae. The species was first described by Hiroshi inoue in 1958 as Celama okanoi.

It is found on the Korean Peninsula, and in Japan.
