= Nola apicalis =

Scientific classification
- Kingdom: Animalia
- Phylum: Arthropoda
- Clade: Pancrustacea
- Class: Insecta
- Order: Lepidoptera
- Superfamily: Noctuoidea
- Family: Nolidae
- Genus: Nola
- Species: N. apicalis

Binomial name
- Nola apicalis (Hampson, 1903)

Synonyms
- Stictane apicalis Hampson, 1903, Manoba apicalis Hampson, 1903

Species of moth

Nola apicalis is a moth in the family Nolidae. It was described by George Hampson in 1903. It is found in Ghana, Nigeria and Uganda. This species was transferred to the genus Stictane in 2022 by G. M. László et al.
