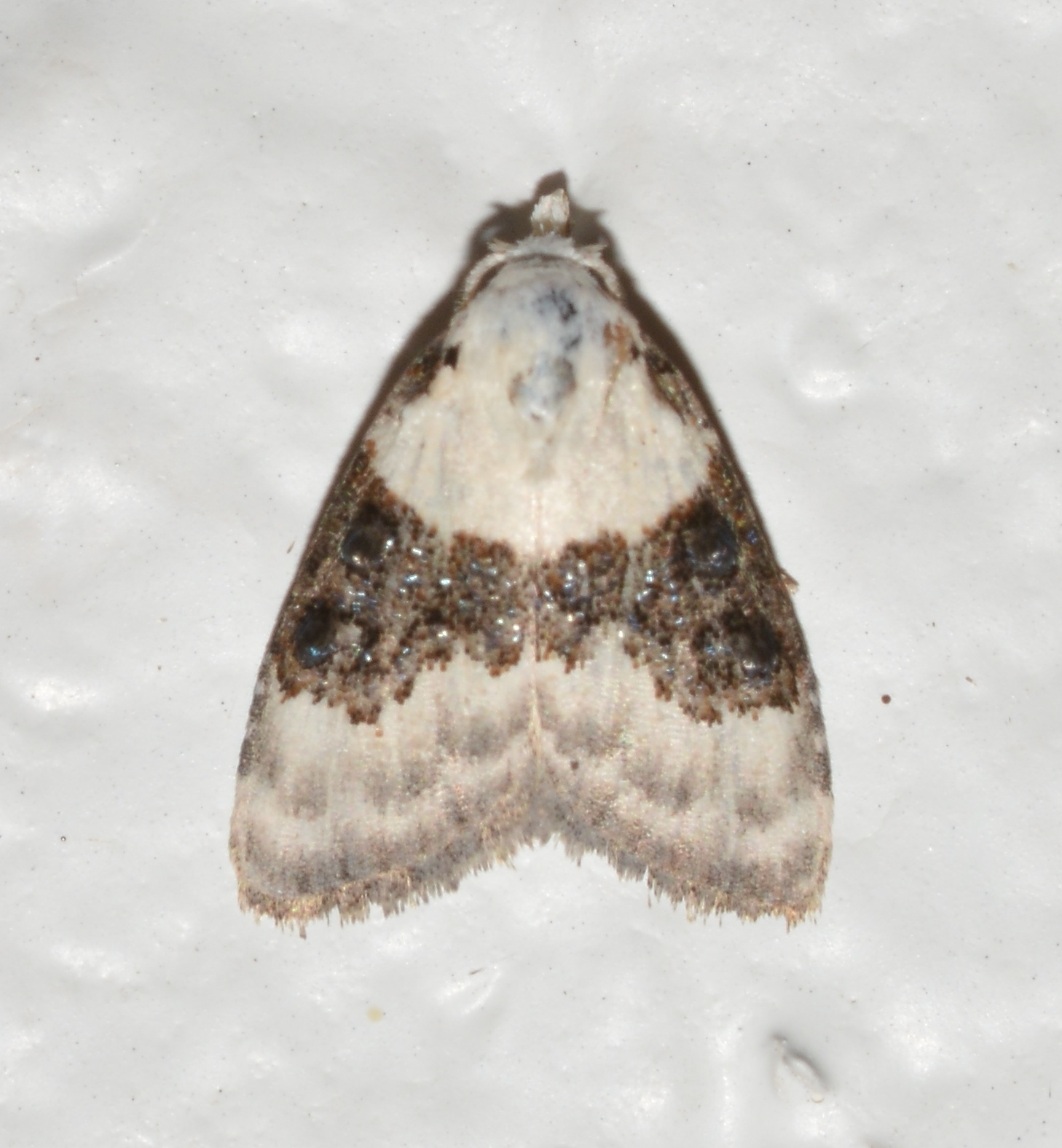

Scientific classification
- Kingdom: Animalia
- Phylum: Arthropoda
- Class: Insecta
- Order: Lepidoptera
- Superfamily: Noctuoidea
- Family: Nolidae
- Genus: Nola
- Species: N. pustulata

Binomial name
- Nola pustulata (Walker, 1865)

= Nola pustulata =

Species of moth

Nola pustulata, the sharp-blotched nola, is a moth in the family Nolidae, first described by Francis Walker in 1865. Its MONA (Hodges number) is 8989.
