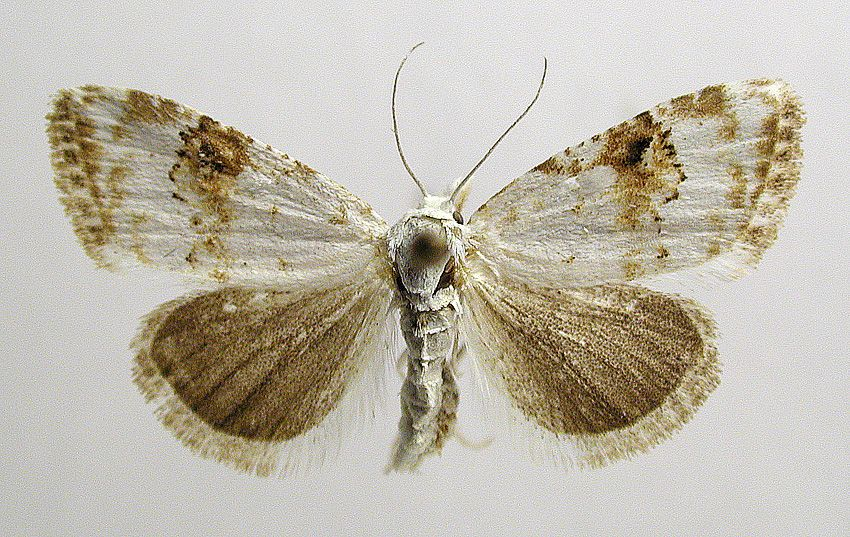

Scientific classification
- Domain: Eukaryota
- Kingdom: Animalia
- Phylum: Arthropoda
- Class: Insecta
- Order: Lepidoptera
- Superfamily: Noctuoidea
- Family: Nolidae
- Genus: Nola
- Species: N. karelica

Binomial name
- Nola karelica Tengström, 1869

Synonyms
- Nola albula var. karelica Tengström, 1869; Nola arctica Schöyen, 1880; Nola arctica var. obsoleta Reuter, 1893

= Nola karelica =

Species of moth

Nola karelica is a moth of the family Nolidae. It is found from northern and central Fennoscandia to northern Russia, Amur, Siberia and Armenia.

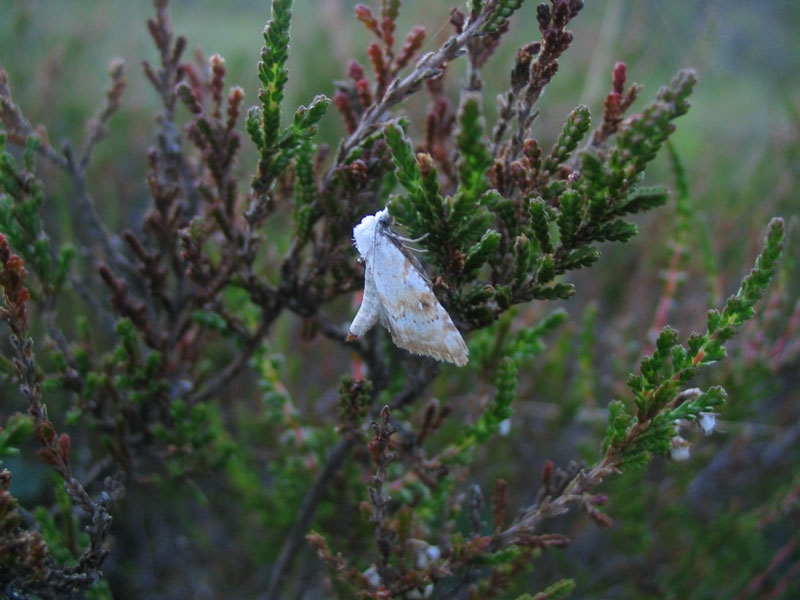

The wingspan is 16–22 mm.

The larvae feed on Salix repens, Rubus chamaemorus and Vaccinium uliginosum.

== Subspecies ==
- Nola karelica karelica
- Nola karelica tigranula Püngeler, 1902
