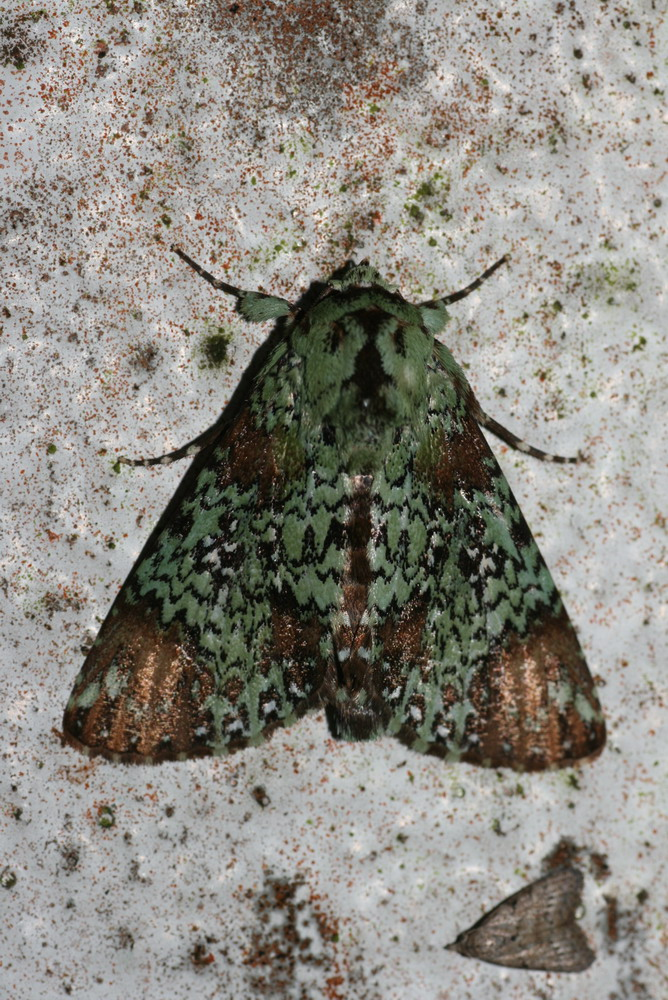
- Donda eurychlora (top) and Nola pumila (bottom)

Scientific classification
- Kingdom: Animalia
- Phylum: Arthropoda
- Class: Insecta
- Order: Lepidoptera
- Superfamily: Noctuoidea
- Family: Erebidae
- Genus: Donda
- Species: D. eurychlora

Binomial name
- Donda eurychlora Walker, 1858

= Donda eurychlora =

Species of moth

Donda eurychlora is a moth of the family Erebidae first described by Francis Walker in 1858. It is found in south-east Asia, including India.

The larvae are considered a pest on Trema orientalis.
