= Nola ovilla =

Scientific classification
- Domain: Eukaryota
- Kingdom: Animalia
- Phylum: Arthropoda
- Class: Insecta
- Order: Lepidoptera
- Superfamily: Noctuoidea
- Family: Nolidae
- Genus: Nola
- Species: N. ovilla

Binomial name
- Nola ovilla Grote, 1875

Species of moth

Nola ovilla, known generally as the woolly nola moth or sharp-blotched nola moth, is a species of nolid moth in the family Nolidae. It is found in North America.

The MONA or Hodges number for Nola ovilla is 8995.
