= Nola ebatoi =

Scientific classification
- Kingdom: Animalia
- Phylum: Arthropoda
- Clade: Pancrustacea
- Class: Insecta
- Order: Lepidoptera
- Superfamily: Noctuoidea
- Family: Nolidae
- Genus: Nola
- Species: N. ebatoi

Binomial name
- Nola ebatoi (Inoue, 1970)

Synonyms
- Celama ebatoi Inoue, 1970

Species of moth

Nola ebatoi is a moth in the family Nolidae. The species was first described by Hiroshi inoue in 1970 as Celama ebatoi.

It is found on the Korean Peninsula, and in Japan.
