= Nola tumulifera =

Scientific classification
- Kingdom: Animalia
- Phylum: Arthropoda
- Class: Insecta
- Order: Lepidoptera
- Superfamily: Noctuoidea
- Family: Nolidae
- Genus: Nola
- Species: N. tumulifera

Binomial name
- Nola tumulifera (Hampson, 1893)

Synonyms
- Celama tumulifera Hampson, 1893; Nola tumulifera Hampson, 1893

Species of moth

Nola tumulifera is a moth of the family Nolidae first described by George Hampson in 1893. It is found in Sri Lanka.
