= Nola progonia =

Scientific classification
- Kingdom: Animalia
- Phylum: Arthropoda
- Class: Insecta
- Order: Lepidoptera
- Superfamily: Noctuoidea
- Family: Nolidae
- Genus: Nola
- Species: N. progonia

Binomial name
- Nola progonia (Hampson, 1914)

Synonyms
- Manoba progonia Hampson, 1914

Species of moth

Nola progonia is a moth in the family Nolidae. It was described by George Hampson in 1914. It is found in Kenya.
