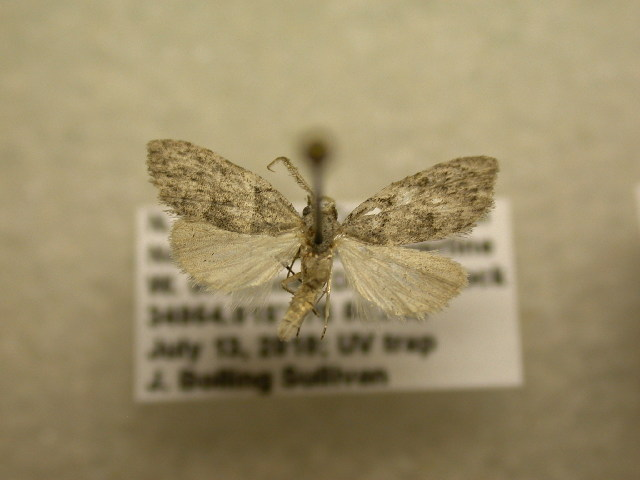

Scientific classification
- Kingdom: Animalia
- Phylum: Arthropoda
- Class: Insecta
- Order: Lepidoptera
- Superfamily: Noctuoidea
- Family: Nolidae
- Genus: Nola
- Species: N. clethrae

Binomial name
- Nola clethrae Dyar, 1899

= Nola clethrae =

Species of moth

Nola clethrae, the sweet pepperbush nola moth, is a nolid moth (family Nolidae). The species was first described by Harrison Gray Dyar Jr. in 1899. It is found in North America.

The MONA or Hodges number for Nola clethrae is 8996.
