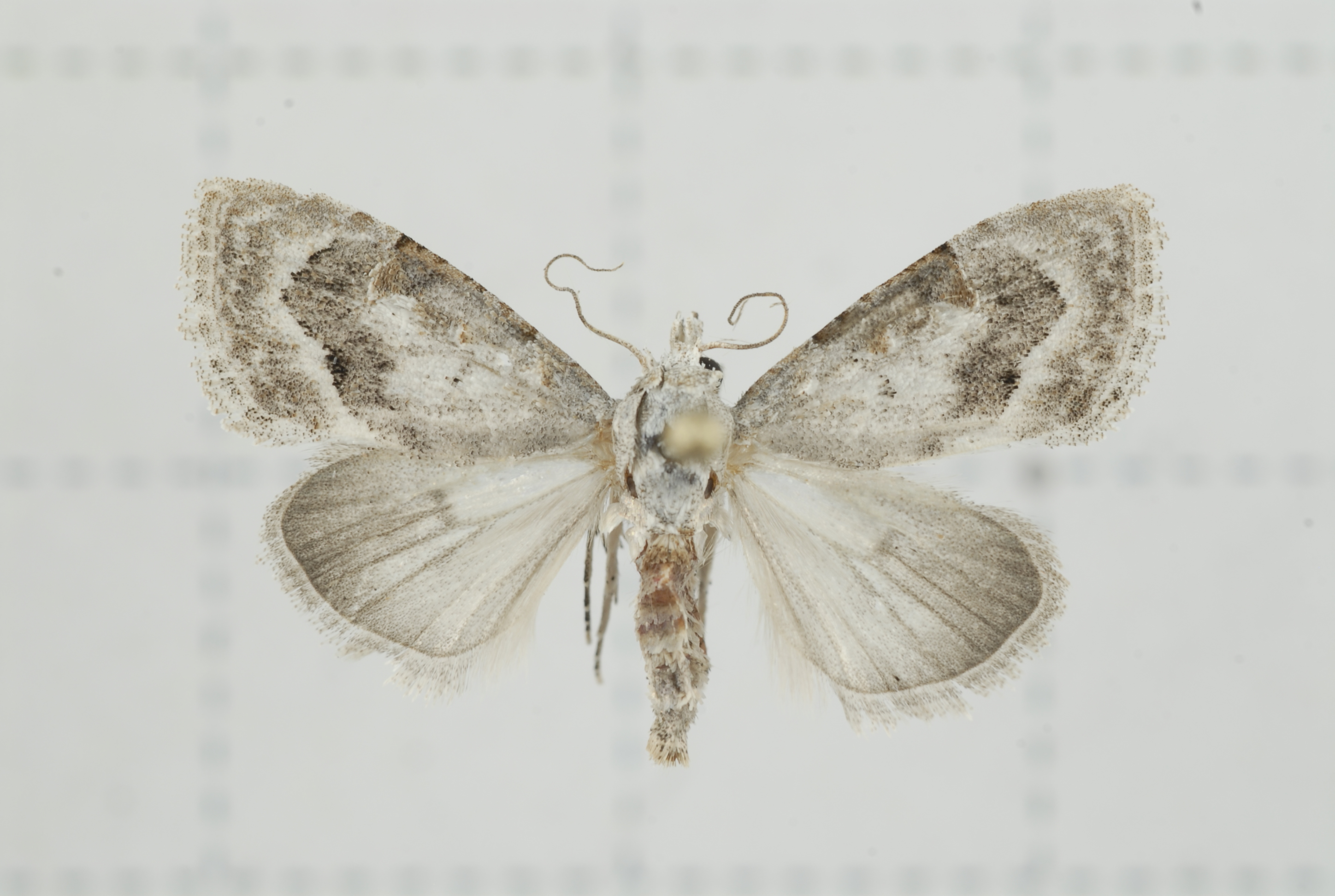

Scientific classification
- Kingdom: Animalia
- Phylum: Arthropoda
- Class: Insecta
- Order: Lepidoptera
- Superfamily: Noctuoidea
- Family: Nolidae
- Genus: Nola
- Species: N. fasciata

Binomial name
- Nola fasciata (Walker, 1866)

Synonyms
- Minnagara fasciata Walker, 1866; Nola nigrifascia Hampson, 1891

= Nola fasciata =

Species of moth

Nola fasciata is a moth of the family Nolidae first described by Francis Walker in 1866. It is found in Indo-Australian tropics of India, Sri Lanka to Borneo, Taiwan, New Guinea and Australia.

== Description ==
Its forewings are whitish with dark variegations. Hindwings grayish with a fading whitish base. The pale grayish postmedial line is double. Double fascia are strongly flexed from the costa. Costa bears pale grayish three plate with raised scales. Its larval host plant is Lantana camara.

== Gallery ==
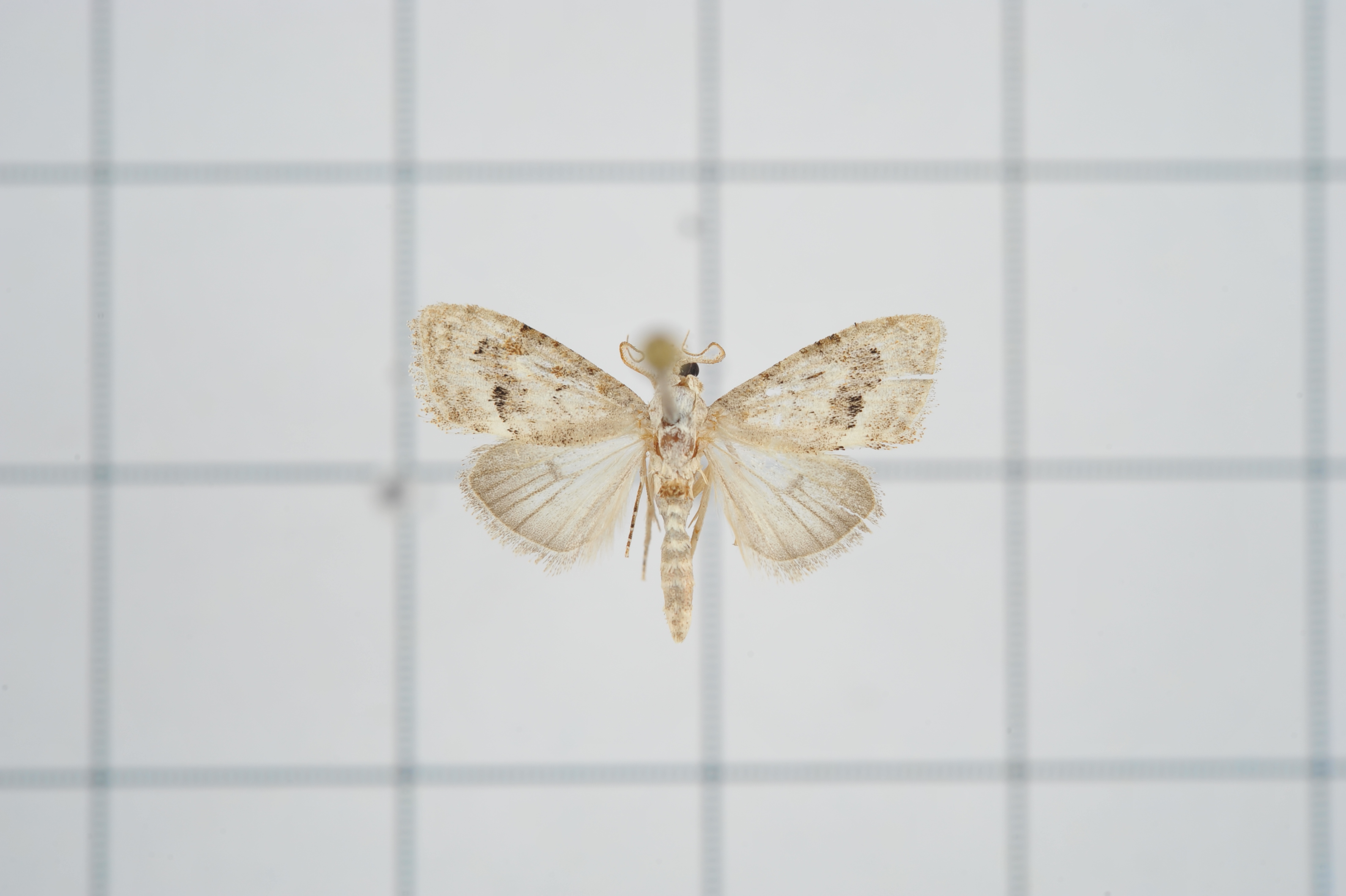

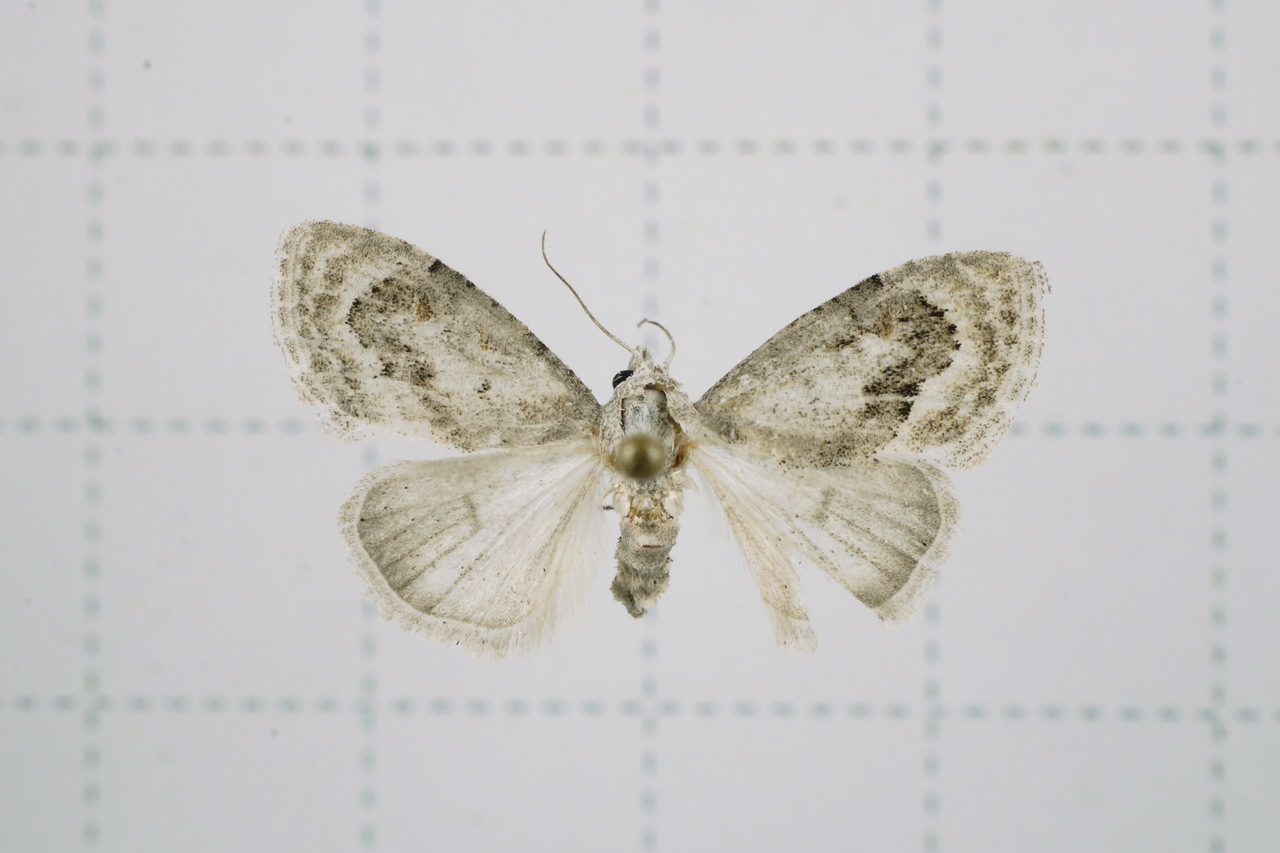
