= Nola atripuncta =

Scientific classification
- Kingdom: Animalia
- Phylum: Arthropoda
- Class: Insecta
- Order: Lepidoptera
- Superfamily: Noctuoidea
- Family: Nolidae
- Genus: Nola
- Species: N. atripuncta

Binomial name
- Nola atripuncta (Hampson, 1909)

Synonyms
- Manoba atripuncta Hampson, 1909

Species of moth

Nola atripuncta is a moth in the family Nolidae. It was described by George Hampson in 1909. It is found in Nigeria.
