= Nola acutapicalis =

Scientific classification
- Kingdom: Animalia
- Phylum: Arthropoda
- Clade: Pancrustacea
- Class: Insecta
- Order: Lepidoptera
- Superfamily: Noctuoidea
- Family: Nolidae
- Genus: Nola
- Species: N. acutapicalis

Binomial name
- Nola acutapicalis Inoue, 1998

Species of moth

Nola acutapicalis is a moth in the family Nolidae. The species was first described by Hiroshi inoue in 1998.

It is found in Nepal.
