= Inouenola grisalis =

Scientific classification
- Kingdom: Animalia
- Phylum: Arthropoda
- Clade: Pancrustacea
- Class: Insecta
- Order: Lepidoptera
- Superfamily: Noctuoidea
- Family: Nolidae
- Genus: Inouenola
- Species: I. grisalis

Binomial name
- Inouenola grisalis (Hampson, 1893)

Synonyms
- Nola grisalis Hampson, 1893

Species of moth

Inouenola grisalis is a moth of the family Nolidae first described by George Hampson in 1893. It is found in Sri Lanka China and Vietnam.
