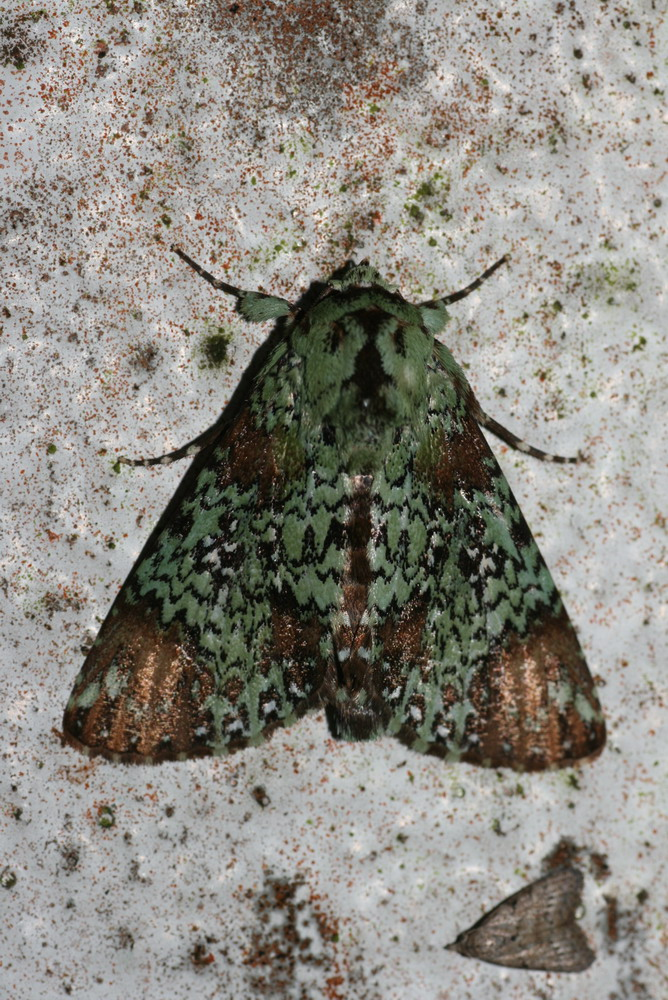
- Donda eurychlora on Fraser's Hill in Malaysia

Scientific classification
- Domain: Eukaryota
- Kingdom: Animalia
- Phylum: Arthropoda
- Class: Insecta
- Order: Lepidoptera
- Superfamily: Noctuoidea
- Family: Erebidae
- Subfamily: Calpinae
- Genus: Donda; Moore, 1882

= Donda (moth) =

Genus of moths

Donda is a genus of moths from the family Erebidae. The genus was discovered by Frederic Moore in 1882.

== Species ==
- Donda continentalis Behounek, Han & Kononenko, 2012 Thailand, Vietnam, SW.China
- Donda eurychlora (Walker, 1858) India
- Donda hunana Han, Behounek & Kononenko, 2020
- Donda lichenoides (Hampson, 1894) Nagas
- Donda ornata Moore, 1883 Bengal
- Donda sailendra Kobes, 1982 Sumatra, Borneo
- Donda sundana Behounek, Han & Kononenko, 2012
