= Hyalospectra =

Scientific classification
- Domain: Eukaryota
- Kingdom: Animalia
- Phylum: Arthropoda
- Class: Insecta
- Order: Lepidoptera
- Family: Drepanidae
- Tribe: Drepanini
- Genus: Hyalospectra; Warren, 1906

Moth genus in family Drepanidae

Hyalospectra is a genus of moths belonging to the subfamily Drepaninae.

== Species ==
- Hyalospectra altipustularia Holloway, 1998
- Hyalospectra diaphana Warren, 1922
- Hyalospectra dierli Holloway, 1998
- Hyalospectra grisea Warren, 1906
- Hyalospectra labi Holloway, 1998
- Hyalospectra pustularia (Walker, 1861)

== Former species ==
- Hyalospectra arizana Wileman, 1911
- Hyalospectra hyalinata Moore, 1867
