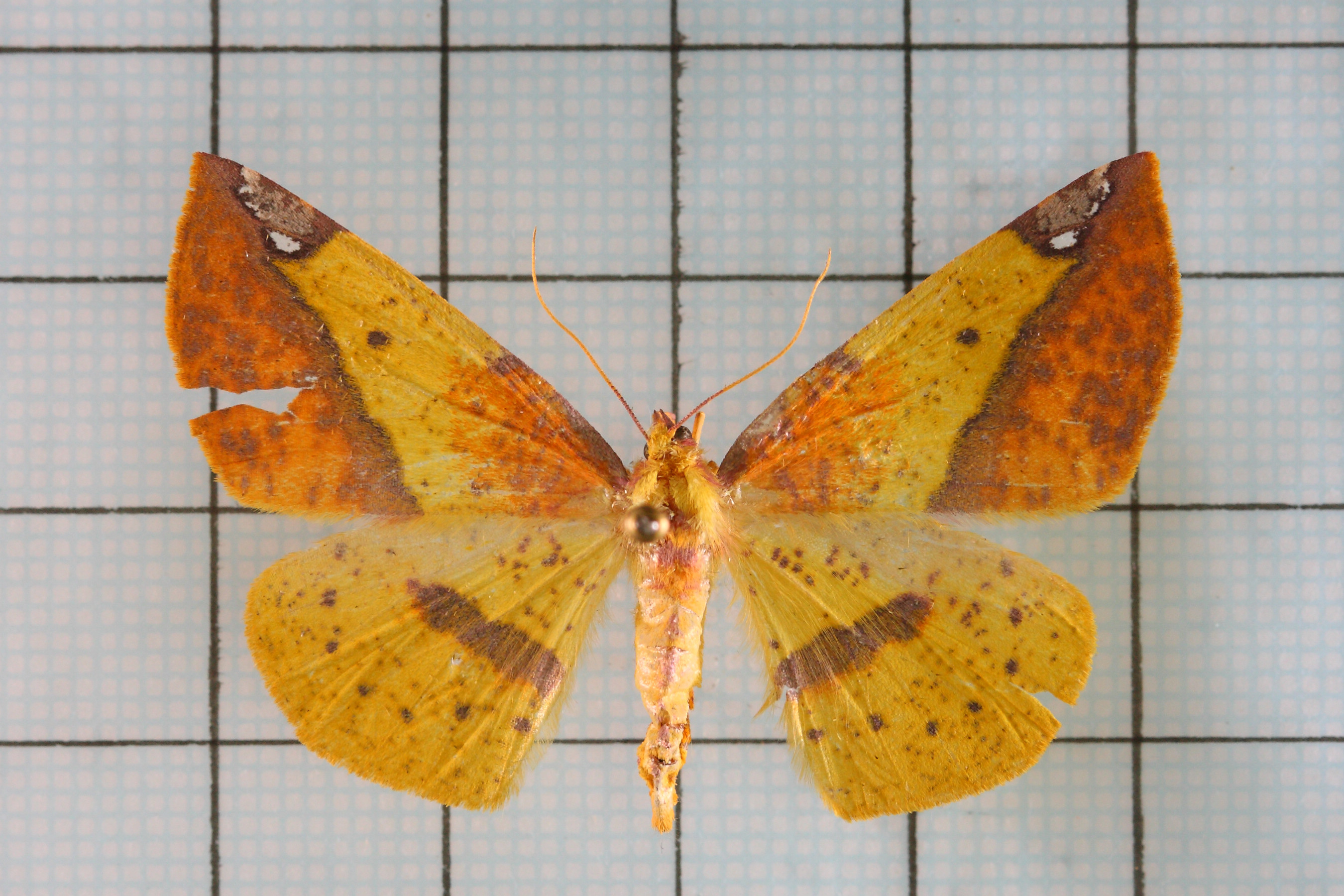

Scientific classification
- Domain: Eukaryota
- Kingdom: Animalia
- Phylum: Arthropoda
- Class: Insecta
- Order: Lepidoptera
- Family: Geometridae
- Genus: Pseudomiza
- Species: P. aurata

Binomial name
- Pseudomiza aurata Wileman, 1915

Synonyms
- Pseudomiza haemonia Wileman, 1940; Pseudomiza cruentaria f. tamahonis Matsumura, 1931

= Pseudomiza aurata =

Species of moth

Pseudomiza aurata is a species of moth of the family Geometridae first described by Alfred Ernest Wileman in 1915. It is found in Taiwan and China.

The wingspan is 38–57 mm (1.5–2.2 in).
