= Eupithecia karapinensis =

Scientific classification
- Domain: Eukaryota
- Kingdom: Animalia
- Phylum: Arthropoda
- Class: Insecta
- Order: Lepidoptera
- Family: Geometridae
- Genus: Eupithecia
- Species: E. karapinensis

Binomial name
- Eupithecia karapinensis Wileman & South, 1917

Species of moth

Eupithecia karapinensis is a moth in the family Geometridae. It is found in Taiwan.
