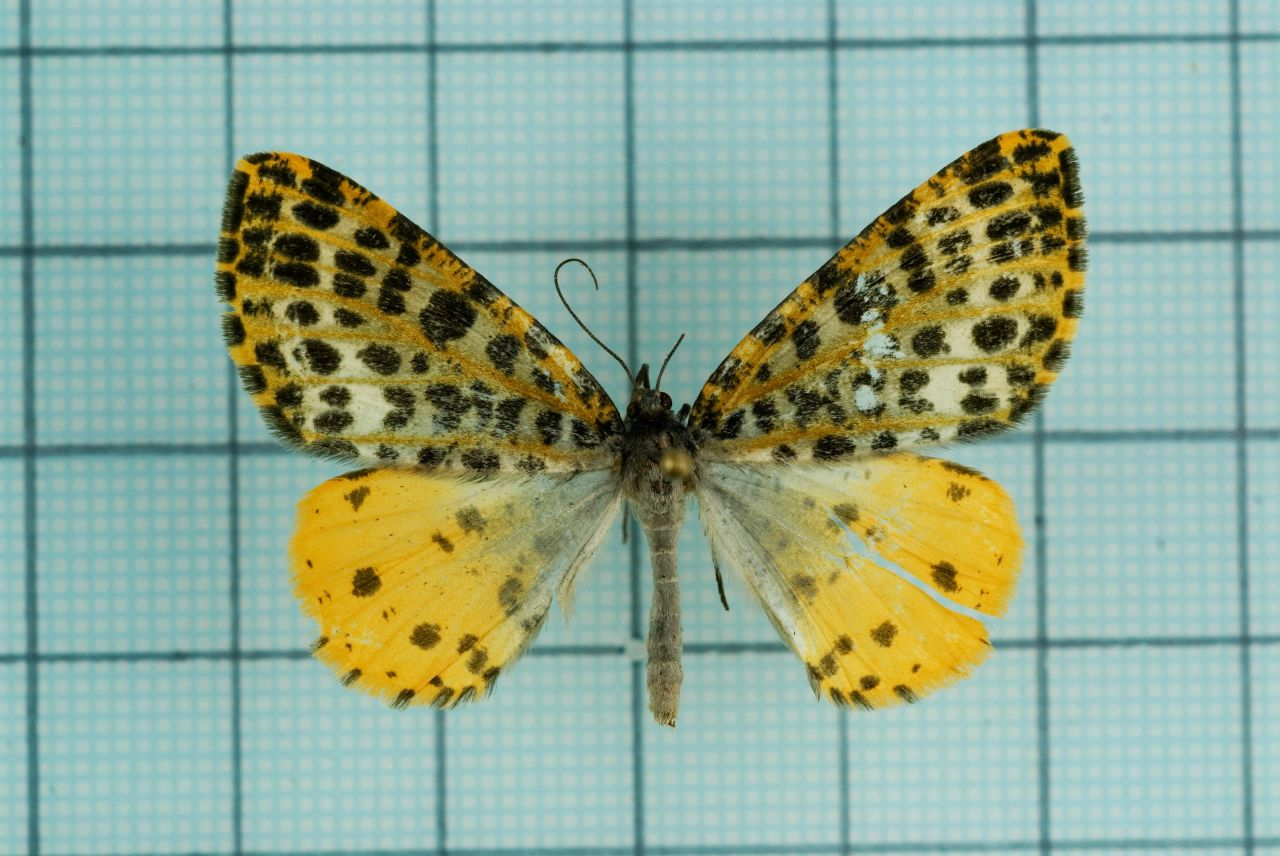
- Male
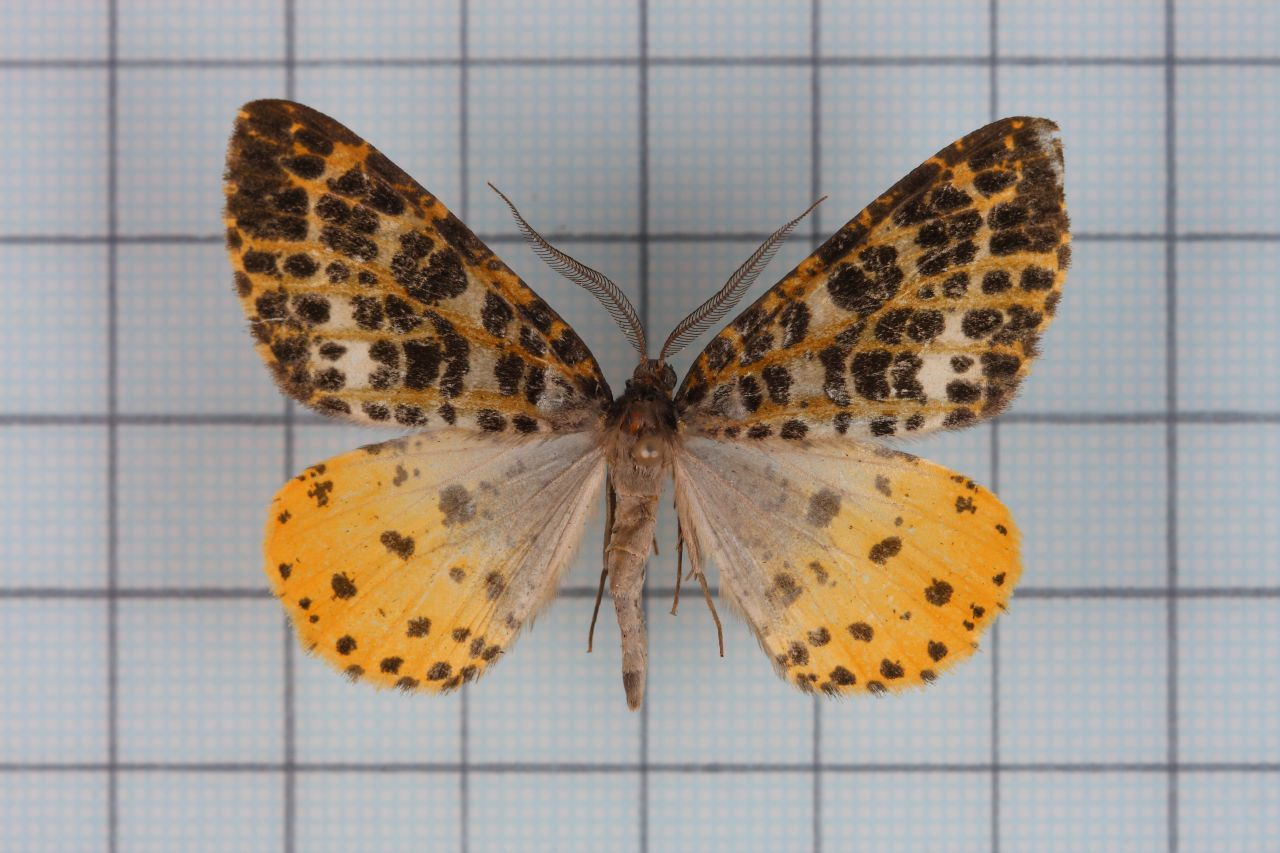
- Female

Scientific classification
- Domain: Eukaryota
- Kingdom: Animalia
- Phylum: Arthropoda
- Class: Insecta
- Order: Lepidoptera
- Family: Geometridae
- Subfamily: Ennominae
- Tribe: Boarmiini
- Genus: Arichanna
- Species: A. ochrivena

Binomial name
- Arichanna ochrivena Wileman, 1915

= Arichanna ochrivena =

Species of moth

Arichanna ochrivena is a moth of the family Geometridae. It is found in Taiwan.
