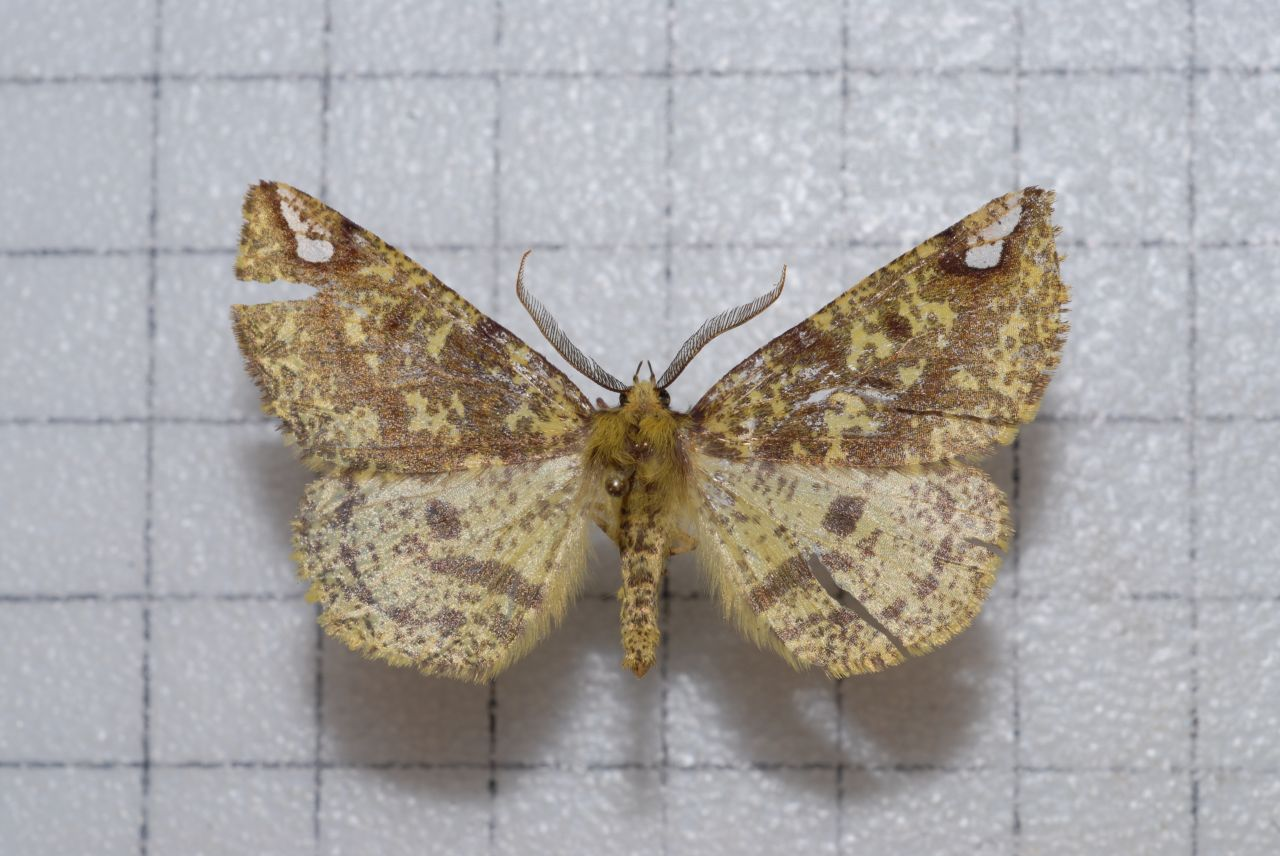

Scientific classification
- Domain: Eukaryota
- Kingdom: Animalia
- Phylum: Arthropoda
- Class: Insecta
- Order: Lepidoptera
- Family: Geometridae
- Genus: Pseudomiza
- Species: P. flavitincta

Binomial name
- Pseudomiza flavitincta (Wileman, 1915)

Synonyms
- Arichanna flavitincta Wileman, 1915

= Pseudomiza flavitincta =

Species of moth

Pseudomiza flavitincta is a species of moth of the family Geometridae. It is found in Taiwan.
