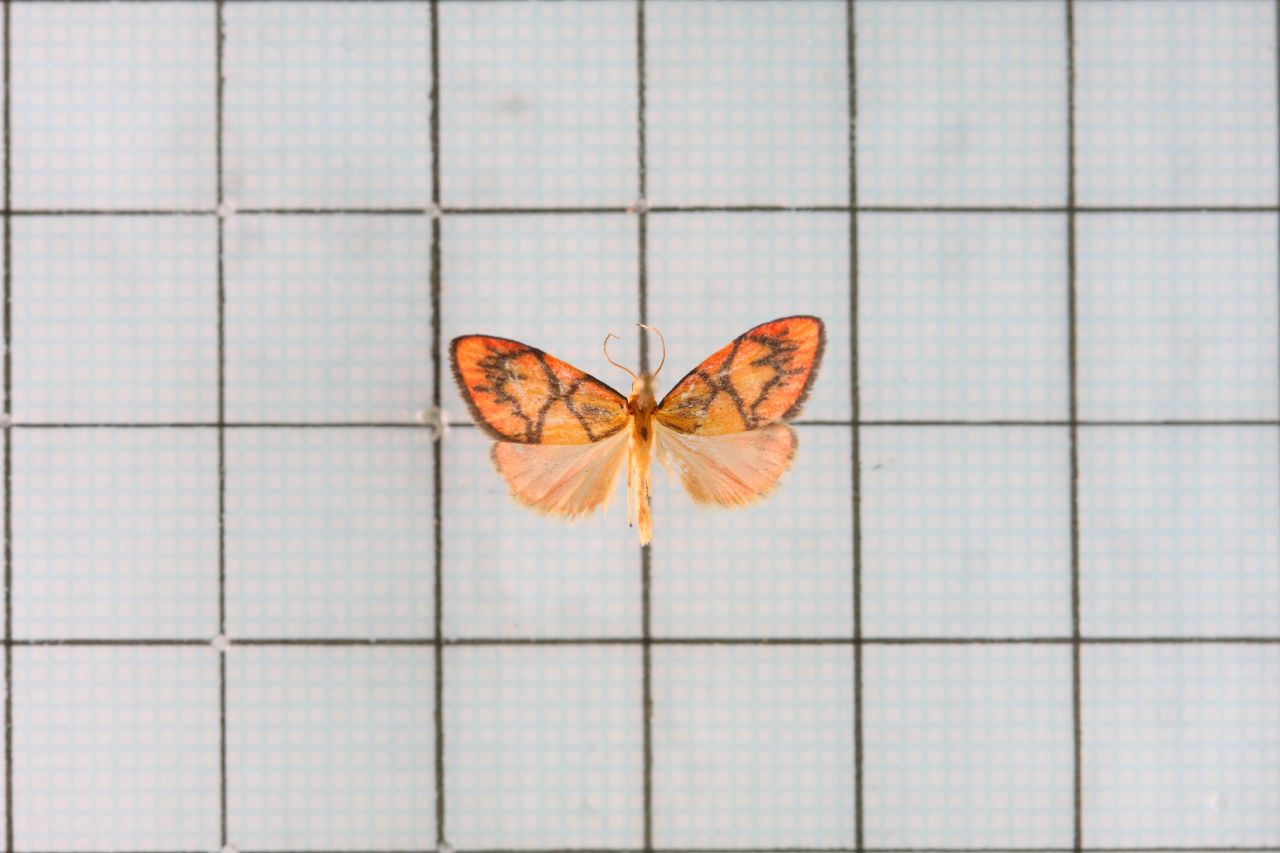

Scientific classification
- Kingdom: Animalia
- Phylum: Arthropoda
- Class: Insecta
- Order: Lepidoptera
- Superfamily: Noctuoidea
- Family: Erebidae
- Subfamily: Arctiinae
- Genus: Asura
- Species: A. connexa

Binomial name
- Asura connexa (Wileman, 1910)

Synonyms
- Miltochrista connexa Wileman, 1910; Barsine connexa (Wileman, 1910)

= Asura connexa =

Species of moth

Asura connexa is a moth of the family Erebidae first described by Alfred Ernest Wileman in 1910. It is endemic to Taiwan.

The wingspan is 21–22 mm.
