= Eudonia promiscua =

Scientific classification
- Kingdom: Animalia
- Phylum: Arthropoda
- Class: Insecta
- Order: Lepidoptera
- Family: Crambidae
- Genus: Eudonia
- Species: E. promiscua

Binomial name
- Eudonia promiscua (Wileman & South, 1919)

Synonyms
- Scoparia promiscua Wileman & South, 1919

Species of moth

Eudonia promiscua is a moth in the family Crambidae. It was described by Wileman and South in 1919. It is found in Taiwan.
