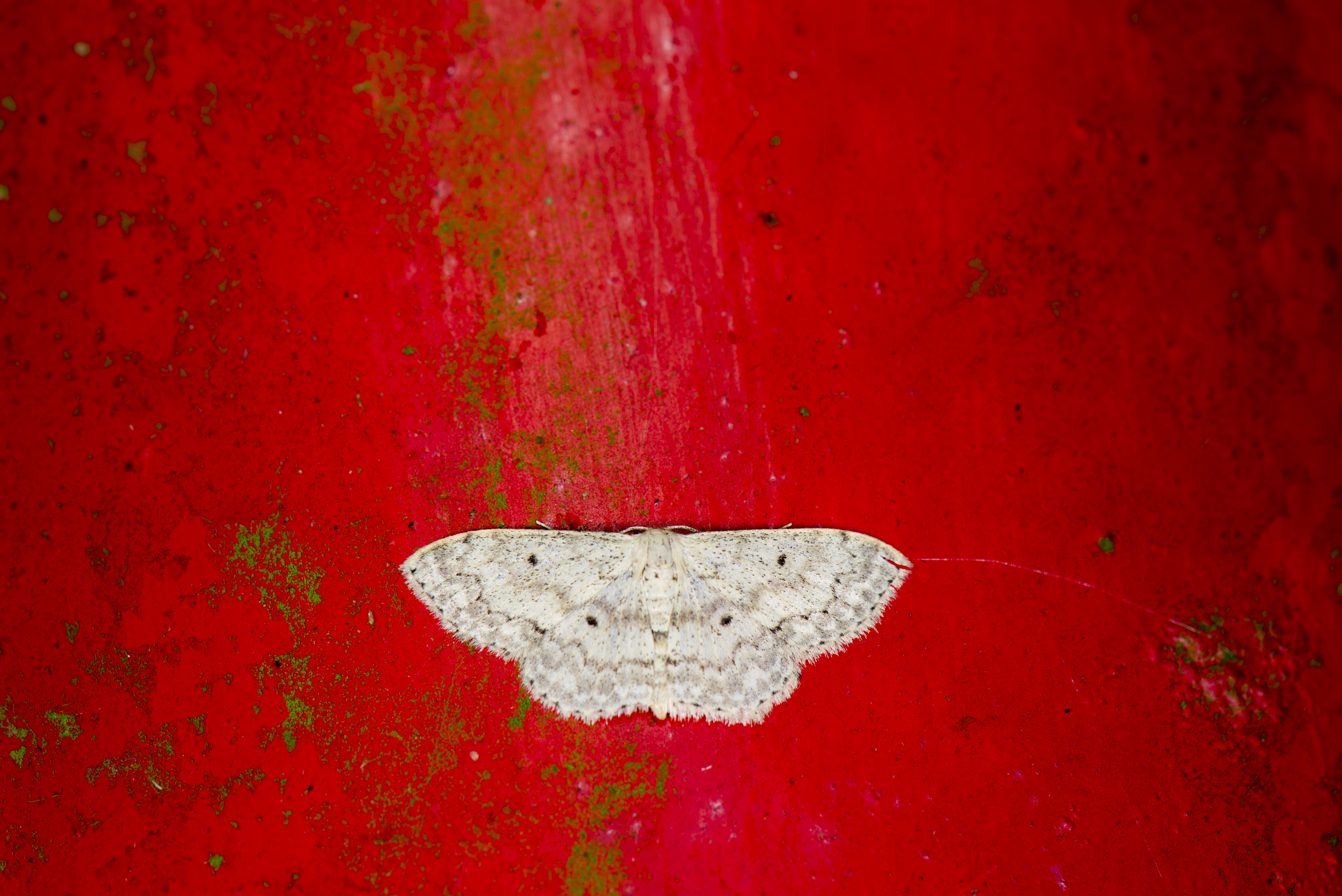

Scientific classification
- Kingdom: Animalia
- Phylum: Arthropoda
- Clade: Pancrustacea
- Class: Insecta
- Order: Lepidoptera
- Family: Geometridae
- Genus: Scopula
- Species: S. limbata

Binomial name
- Scopula limbata (Wileman, 1915)

Synonyms
- Acidalia limbata Wileman, 1915

= Scopula limbata =

Species of geometer moth in subfamily Sterrhinae

Scopula limbata is a moth of the family Geometridae. It was described by Wileman in 1915. It is found in Taiwan and Japan.
