= Scopula rantaizanensis =

Scientific classification
- Domain: Eukaryota
- Kingdom: Animalia
- Phylum: Arthropoda
- Class: Insecta
- Order: Lepidoptera
- Family: Geometridae
- Genus: Scopula
- Species: S. rantaizanensis

Binomial name
- Scopula rantaizanensis (Wileman, 1915)

Synonyms
- Ptychopoda rantaizanensis Wileman, 1915

Species of geometer moth in subfamily Sterrhinae

Scopula rantaizanensis is a moth of the family Geometridae. It is found in Taiwan.
