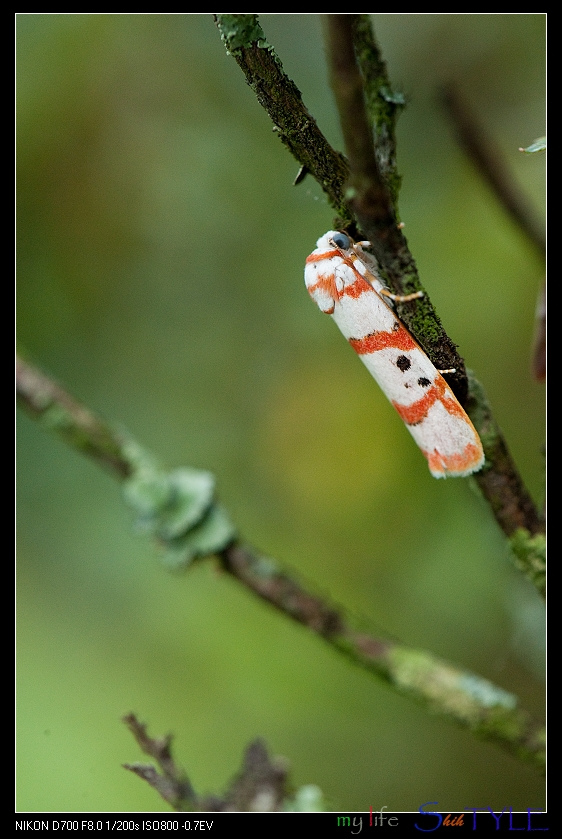

Scientific classification
- Domain: Eukaryota
- Kingdom: Animalia
- Phylum: Arthropoda
- Class: Insecta
- Order: Lepidoptera
- Superfamily: Noctuoidea
- Family: Erebidae
- Subfamily: Arctiinae
- Genus: Cyana
- Species: C. quadripartita

Binomial name
- Cyana quadripartita (Wileman, 1910)

Synonyms
- Chionaema quadripartita Wileman, 1910

= Cyana quadripartita =

Species of insect in Taiwan

Cyana quadripartita is a moth of the family Erebidae. It was described by Alfred Ernest Wileman in 1910. It is found in Taiwan.
