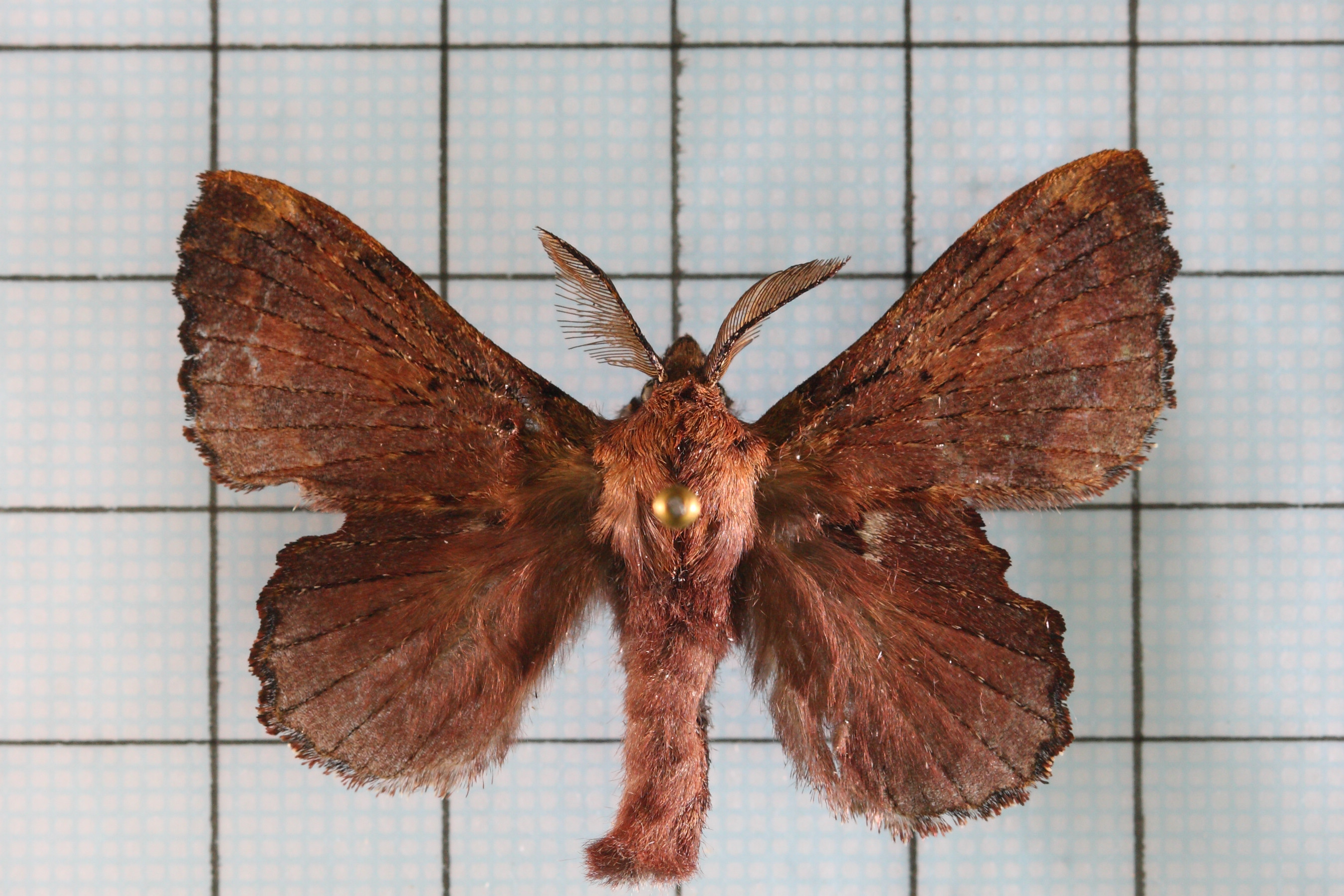

Scientific classification
- Kingdom: Animalia
- Phylum: Arthropoda
- Class: Insecta
- Order: Lepidoptera
- Family: Lasiocampidae
- Genus: Takanea
- Species: T. excisa

Binomial name
- Takanea excisa (Wileman, 1910)

Synonyms
- Crinocraspeda excisa Wileman, 1910

= Takanea excisa =

Species of moth

Takanea excisa is a species of moth of the family Lasiocampidae. It is found in Taiwan.

The wingspan is 35–40 mm.
