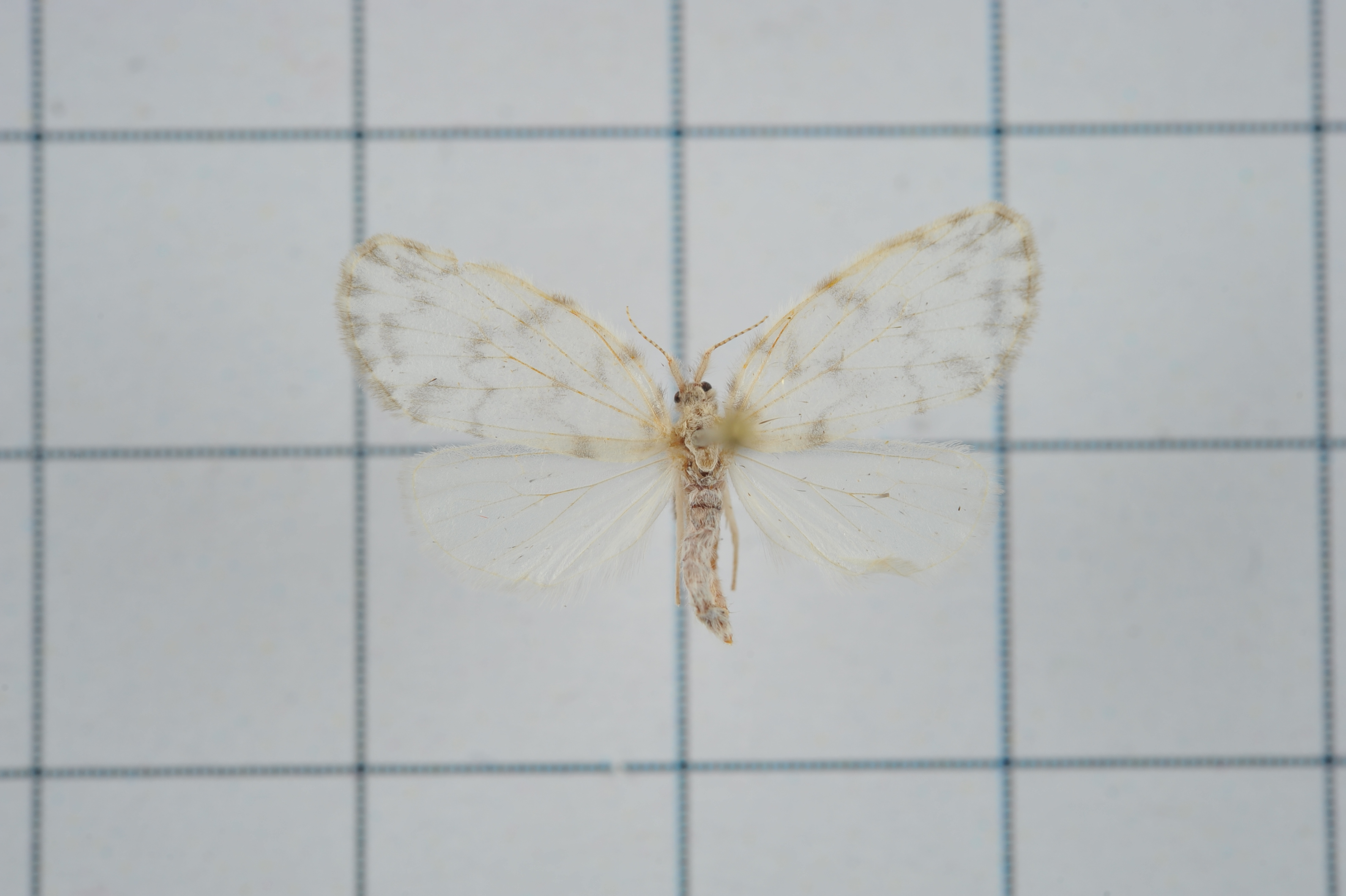

Scientific classification
- Kingdom: Animalia
- Phylum: Arthropoda
- Class: Insecta
- Order: Lepidoptera
- Superfamily: Noctuoidea
- Family: Erebidae
- Subfamily: Arctiinae
- Genus: Chamaita
- Species: C. hirta

Binomial name
- Chamaita hirta Wileman, 1911

= Chamaita hirta =

Species of moth

Chamaita hirta is a moth of the family Erebidae first described by Alfred Ernest Wileman in 1911. It is found in Taiwan.

The wingspan is 15–16 mm.
