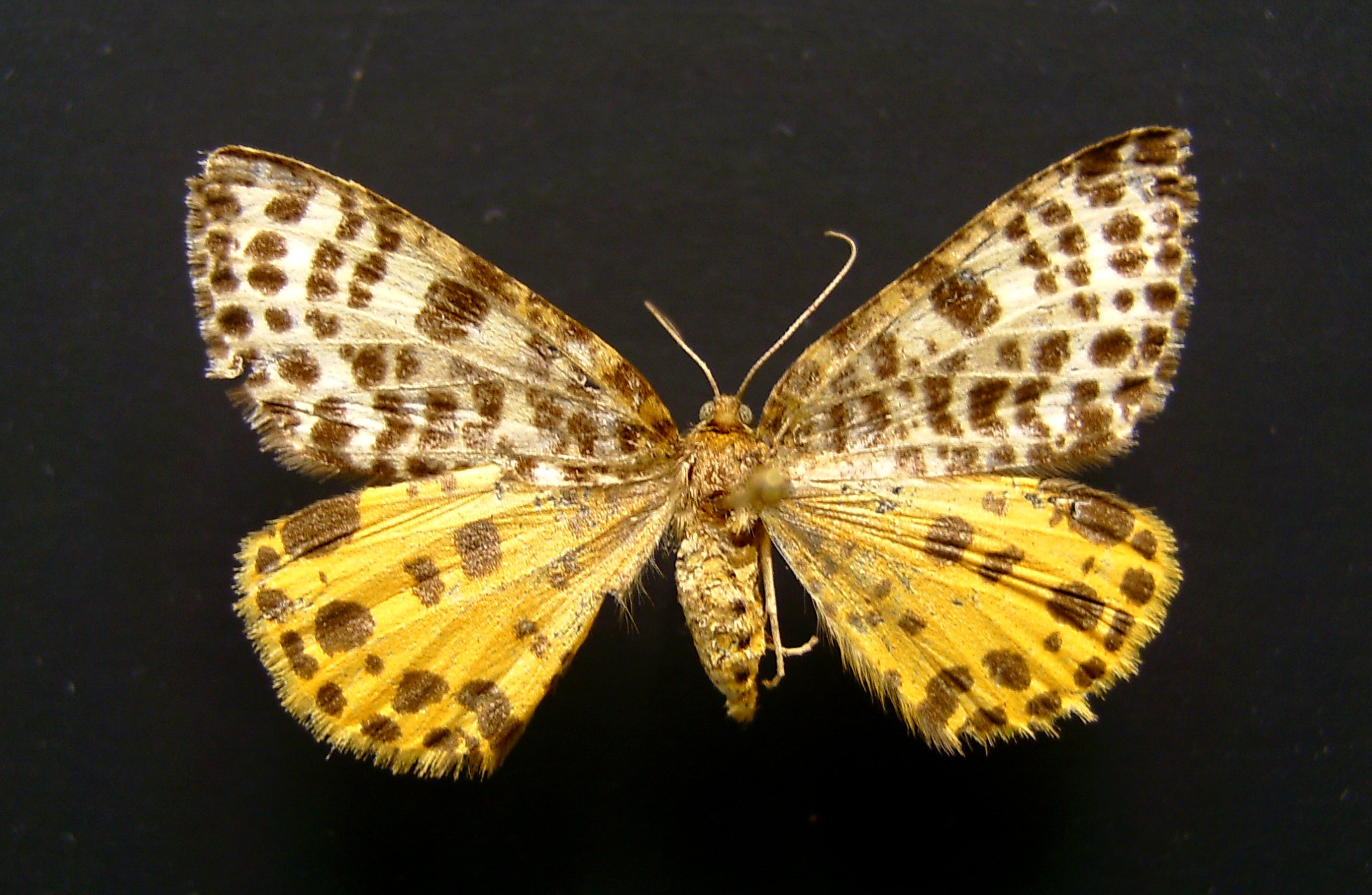
- Arichanna melanari

Scientific classification
- Kingdom: Animalia
- Phylum: Arthropoda
- Class: Insecta
- Order: Lepidoptera
- Family: Geometridae
- Subfamily: Ennominae
- Tribe: Boarmiini
- Genus: Arichanna; Moore, 1867

= Arichanna =

Genus of moths

Arichanna is a genus of moths in the family Geometridae.

== Species ==
- Arichanna albomacularia Leech, 1891
- Arichanna flavomacularia Leech, 1897
- Arichanna gaschkevitchii Motschulsky, 1860
- Arichanna interplagata (Guenee, 1857)
- Arichanna jaguararia Sato, 1999
- Arichanna maculosa Wileman, 1912
- Arichanna marginata Warren, 1893
- Arichanna melanaria Linnaeus, 1758
- Arichanna ochrivena Wileman, 1915
- Arichanna olivescens Wileman&South, 1917
- Arichanna picaria Wileman, 1910
- Arichanna postflava Wileman, 1914
- Arichanna pryeraria Leech, 1891
- Arichanna sinica Wehrli, 1933
- Arichanna tetrica Butler, 1878
- Arichanna transfasciata Warren, 1893
- Arichanna vernalis Fu & Sato, 2010
