= Hyalospectra pustularia =

Scientific classification
- Kingdom: Animalia
- Phylum: Arthropoda
- Class: Insecta
- Order: Lepidoptera
- Family: Drepanidae
- Genus: Hyalospectra
- Species: H. pustularia

Binomial name
- Hyalospectra pustularia (Walker, 1861)

Synonyms
- Strepsigonia pustularia Walker, 1861; Ectothyris pustularia; Macaria pustularia

Species of hook-tip moth

Hyalospectra pustularia is a moth in the family Drepanidae. It was described by Francis Walker in 1861. It is found on the Indonesian islands of Borneo and Siberut.

Adults are whitish, the wings mostly fawn coloured exteriorly, thinly and irregularly black speckled, with two macular irregular hyaline (glass-like) iridescent bands, of which the second is marginal. There are some blackish patches, which are intersected by three irregular whitish lines and by whitish veins.
