= Takanea =

Scientific classification
- Kingdom: Animalia
- Phylum: Arthropoda
- Class: Insecta
- Order: Lepidoptera
- Family: Lasiocampidae
- Genus: Takanea; Nagano, 1917

Synonyms
- Seitzia Scriba, 1919

Genus of moths

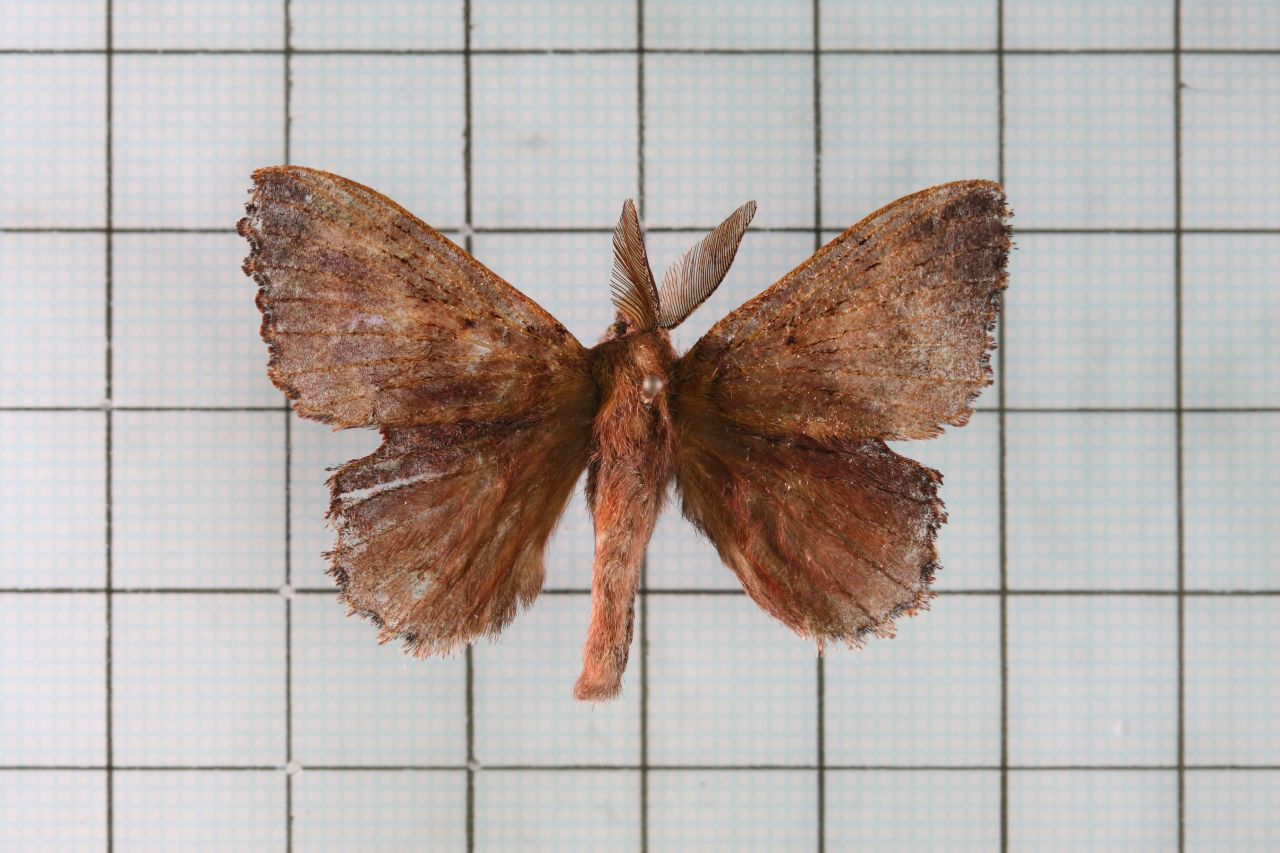

Takanea is a genus of moths in the family Lasiocampidae. The genus was erected by Nagano in 1917.

== Selected species ==
- Takanea diehli de Lajonquière, 1978
- Takanea excisa (Wileman, 1910)
- Takanea miyakei (Wileman, 1915)
