= Hyalospectra diaphana =

Scientific classification
- Domain: Eukaryota
- Kingdom: Animalia
- Phylum: Arthropoda
- Class: Insecta
- Order: Lepidoptera
- Family: Drepanidae
- Genus: Hyalospectra
- Species: H. diaphana

Binomial name
- Hyalospectra diaphana Warren, 1922

Species of hook-tip moth

Hyalospectra diaphana is a moth in the family Drepanidae. It was described by Warren in 1922. It is endemic to New Guinea.
