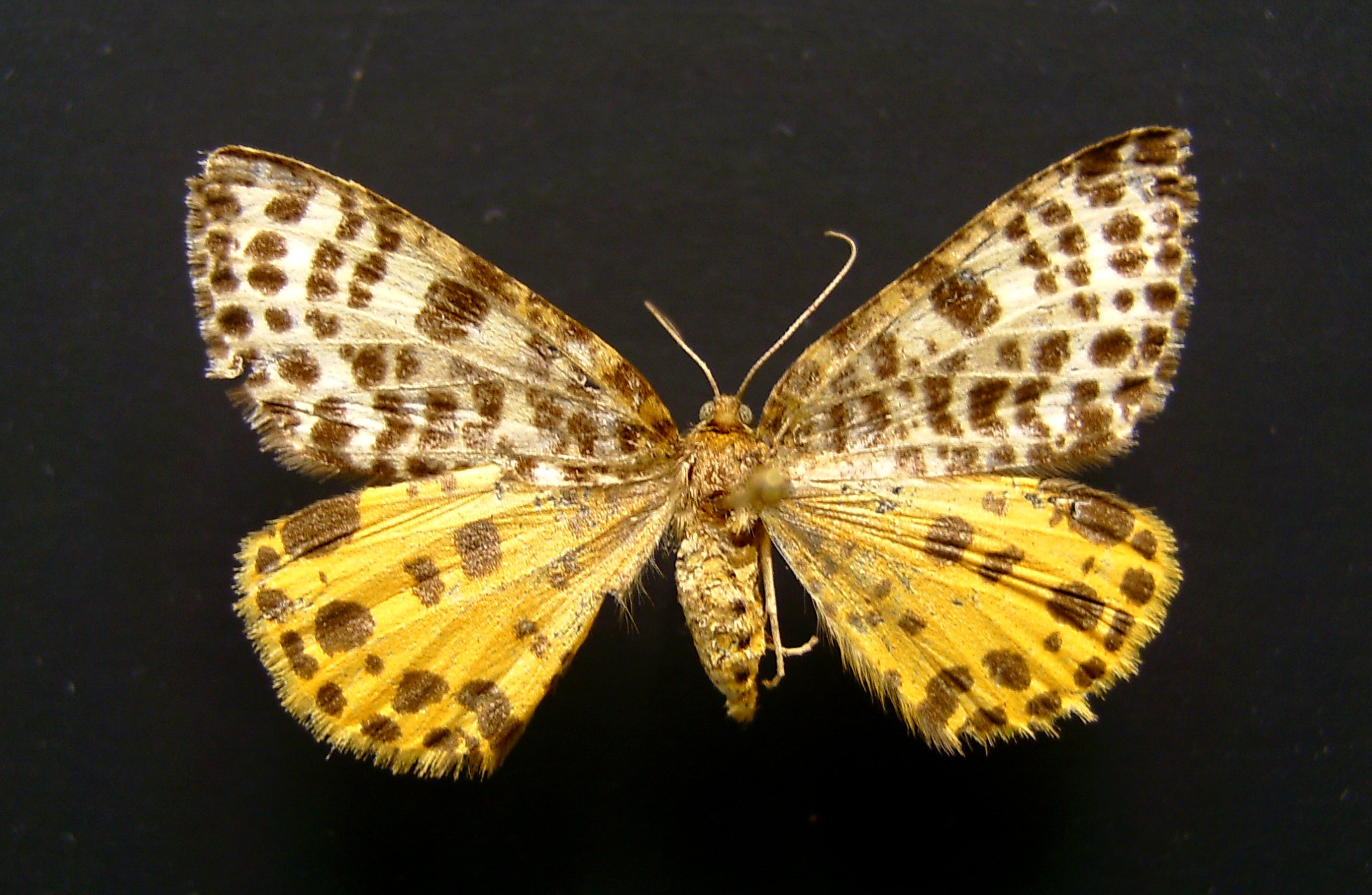

Scientific classification
- Kingdom: Animalia
- Phylum: Arthropoda
- Class: Insecta
- Order: Lepidoptera
- Family: Geometridae
- Subfamily: Ennominae
- Tribe: Boarmiini
- Genus: Arichanna
- Species: A. melanaria

Binomial name
- Arichanna melanaria (Linnaeus, 1758)

= Arichanna melanaria =

Species of moth

Arichanna melanaria is a species of moth of the family Geometridae. It is found over most of Europe (except Great Britain, the Benelux, the Iberian Peninsula, Italy and Greece), Mongolia, east to Japan. The wingspan is 36–42 mm. Adults are on wing from June to September depending on the location.

The larvae feed on the leaves of Vaccinium uliginosum, Vaccinium oxycoccos and Rhododendron tomentosum.
