= Chamaita barnardi =

Scientific classification
- Domain: Eukaryota
- Kingdom: Animalia
- Phylum: Arthropoda
- Class: Insecta
- Order: Lepidoptera
- Superfamily: Noctuoidea
- Family: Erebidae
- Subfamily: Arctiinae
- Genus: Chamaita
- Species: C. barnardi

Binomial name
- Chamaita barnardi (T. P. Lucas, 1894)

Synonyms
- Nudaria barnardi T. P. Lucas, 1894

Species of moth

Chamaita barnardi is a moth of the family Erebidae first described by Thomas Pennington Lucas in 1894. It is found in Australia (including Queensland).

Adults have off-white forewings with a faint brown pattern.
