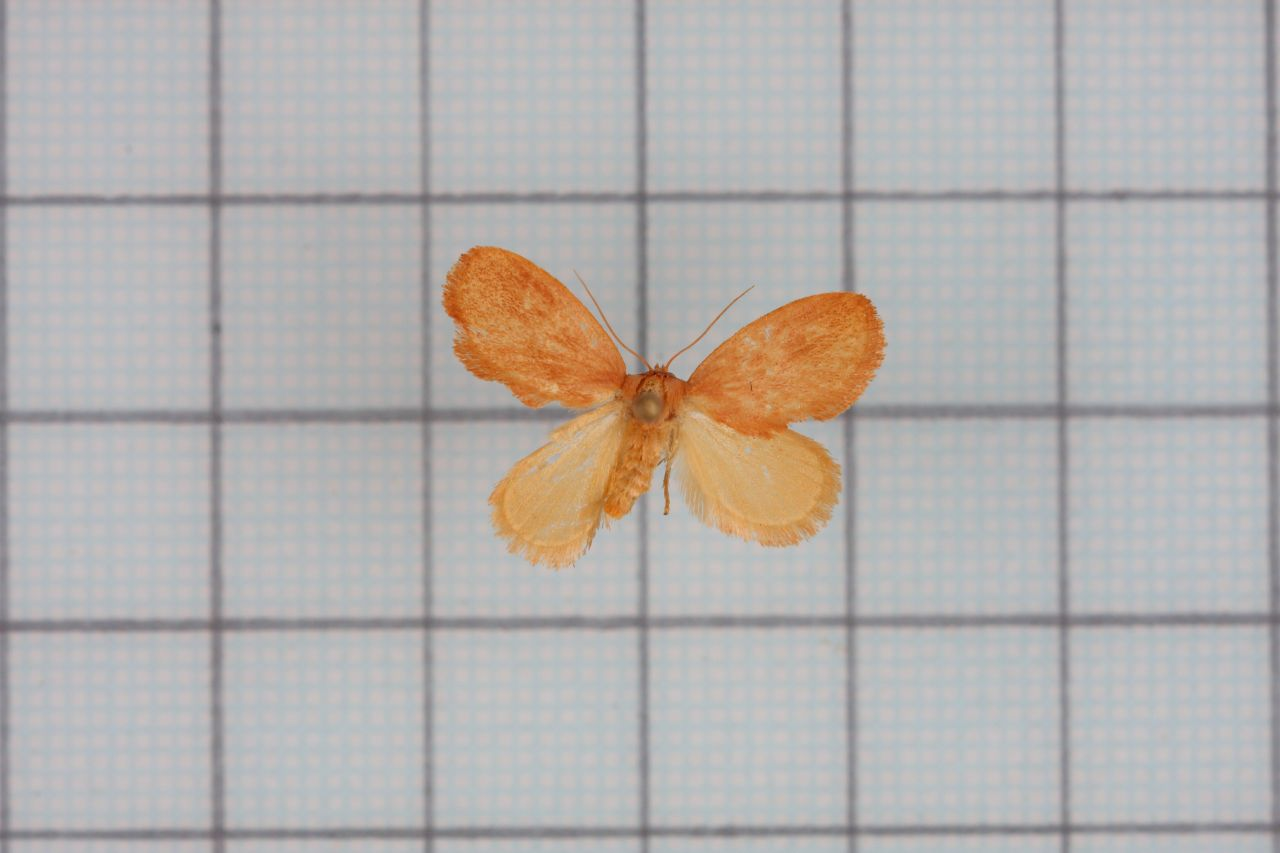

Scientific classification
- Kingdom: Animalia
- Phylum: Arthropoda
- Clade: Pancrustacea
- Class: Insecta
- Order: Lepidoptera
- Family: Limacodidae
- Genus: Flavinarosa; Holloway, 1986

= Flavinarosa =

Genus of moths

Flavinarosa is a genus of moths of the family Limacodidae.

== Species ==
- Flavinarosa acantha Solovyev, 2010
- Flavinarosa alius Solovyev & Witt, 2009
- Flavinarosa glaesa Solovyev & Witt, 2009
- Flavinarosa holoxanthia (Hampson, 1900)
- Flavinarosa kozyavka Solovyev, 2010
- Flavinarosa luna Solovyev, 2010
- Flavinarosa obscura (Wileman, 1911)
- Flavinarosa paucispina (Holloway, 1986)
- Flavinarosa ptaha Solovyev, 2010
