= Chamaita sundanympha =

Scientific classification
- Kingdom: Animalia
- Phylum: Arthropoda
- Clade: Pancrustacea
- Class: Insecta
- Order: Lepidoptera
- Superfamily: Noctuoidea
- Family: Erebidae
- Subfamily: Arctiinae
- Genus: Chamaita
- Species: C. sundanympha

Binomial name
- Chamaita sundanympha Holloway, 2001

Species of moth

Chamaita sundanympha is a moth of the family Erebidae. It is found on Borneo and Java. The habitat consists of lowland forests.

The length of the forewings is about 7 mm for males and 7–8 mm for females.
