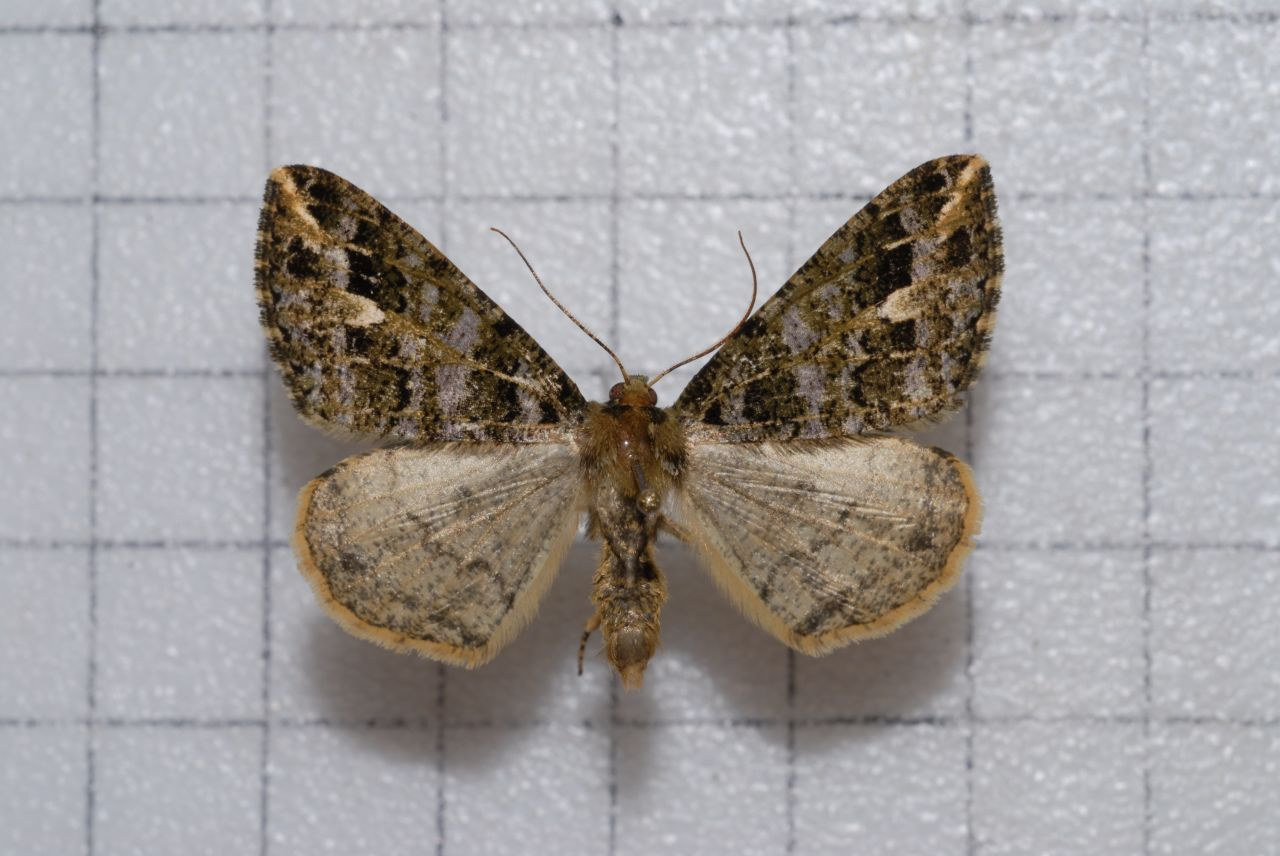

Scientific classification
- Domain: Eukaryota
- Kingdom: Animalia
- Phylum: Arthropoda
- Class: Insecta
- Order: Lepidoptera
- Family: Geometridae
- Subfamily: Ennominae
- Tribe: Boarmiini
- Genus: Arichanna
- Species: A. pryeraria

Binomial name
- Arichanna pryeraria Leech, 1891

= Arichanna pryeraria =

Species of moth

Arichanna pryeraria is a moth of the family Geometridae. It is found in Japan and Taiwan.

The wingspan is 38–42 mm.
