= Chamaita psocidula =

Scientific classification
- Domain: Eukaryota
- Kingdom: Animalia
- Phylum: Arthropoda
- Class: Insecta
- Order: Lepidoptera
- Superfamily: Noctuoidea
- Family: Erebidae
- Subfamily: Arctiinae
- Genus: Chamaita
- Species: C. psocidula

Binomial name
- Chamaita psocidula van Eecke, 1926

Species of moth

Chamaita psocidula is a moth of the family Erebidae. It is found on Sumatra and Peninsular Malaysia.

The wingspan is about 16 mm. The wings are transparent dirty white, the forewings with some light brownish-grey spots at the base. The hindwings are transparent white with a brownish-grey tinge tint at the outer margin and subapically.
