= Hyalospectra grisea =

Scientific classification
- Domain: Eukaryota
- Kingdom: Animalia
- Phylum: Arthropoda
- Class: Insecta
- Order: Lepidoptera
- Family: Drepanidae
- Genus: Hyalospectra
- Species: H. grisea

Binomial name
- Hyalospectra grisea Warren, 1906

Species of hook-tip moth

Hyalospectra grisea is a moth in the family Drepanidae. It was described by William Warren in 1906. It is found in New Guinea.

The wingspan is about 30 mm. The forewings are hyaline (glass like), the basal area, the costal area above the subcostal vein and the hindmarginal border clothed with sparse grey scales. At about one-third from the base is a dark paler-edged lunulate-dentate line, toothed outwards on the veins. There is a lunulate-dentate dark line in the grey marginal area, running out from the costa at three-fourths and below the middle forming the limit of the hyaline space. This space is roughly four lobed, comprising the outer half of the cell and the inner half of all the intervals between veins 2 and 8. There is a round hyaline marginal spot between veins 3 and 4, and the marginal area below the apex is semihyaline. There is a dark grey marginal line, spotted on the veins. The hindwings are grey, with the base, an angled band beyond the middle, and the marginal spot between veins 3 and 4 hyaline.
