= Chamaita celebensis =

Scientific classification
- Domain: Eukaryota
- Kingdom: Animalia
- Phylum: Arthropoda
- Class: Insecta
- Order: Lepidoptera
- Superfamily: Noctuoidea
- Family: Erebidae
- Subfamily: Arctiinae
- Genus: Chamaita
- Species: C. celebensis

Binomial name
- Chamaita celebensis Roepke, 1946

Species of moth

Chamaita celebensis is a moth of the family Erebidae. It is found on Sulawesi.
