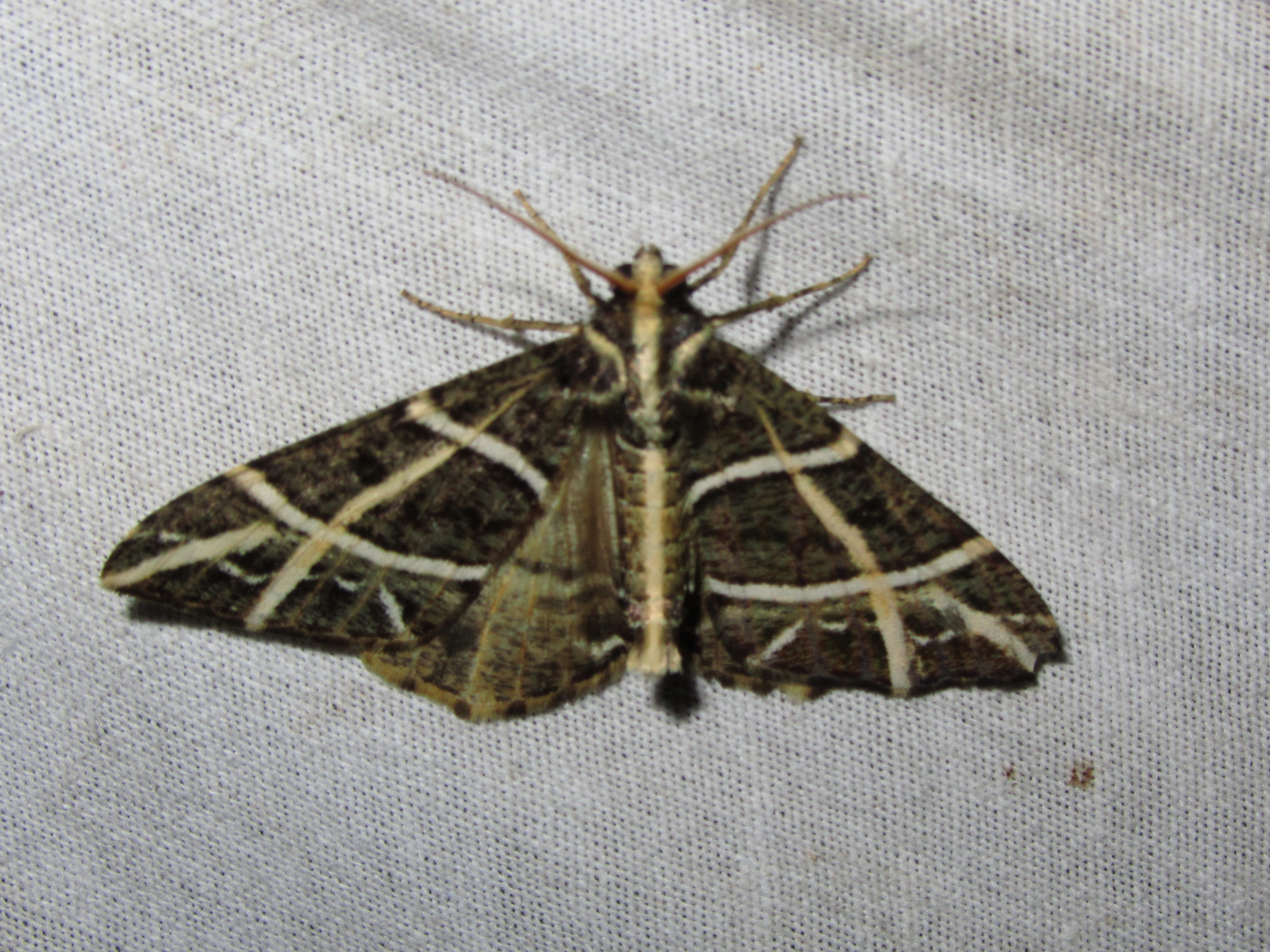

Scientific classification
- Domain: Eukaryota
- Kingdom: Animalia
- Phylum: Arthropoda
- Class: Insecta
- Order: Lepidoptera
- Family: Geometridae
- Genus: Arichanna
- Species: A. transfasciata

Binomial name
- Arichanna transfasciata Warren, 1893

= Arichanna transfasciata =

Species of moth

Arichanna transfasciata is a moth of the family Geometridae. It is found in Laos, Myanmar, Bhutan and India.
