= Chamaita neuropteroides =

Scientific classification
- Kingdom: Animalia
- Phylum: Arthropoda
- Class: Insecta
- Order: Lepidoptera
- Superfamily: Noctuoidea
- Family: Erebidae
- Subfamily: Arctiinae
- Genus: Chamaita
- Species: C. neuropteroides

Binomial name
- Chamaita neuropteroides Hampson, 1894

Species of moth

Chamaita neuropteroides is a moth of the family Erebidae first described by George Hampson in 1894. It is found in Assam, India.
