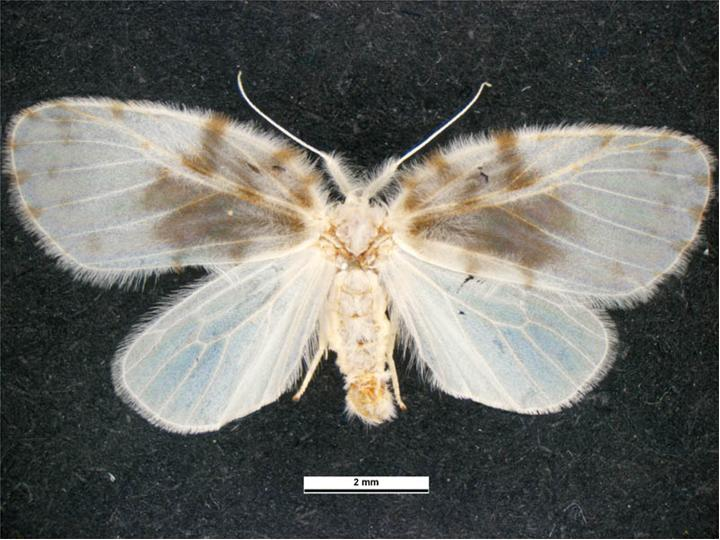
- Chamaita species

Scientific classification
- Kingdom: Animalia
- Phylum: Arthropoda
- Class: Insecta
- Order: Lepidoptera
- Superfamily: Noctuoidea
- Family: Erebidae
- Subfamily: Arctiinae
- Tribe: Lithosiini
- Subtribe: Nudariina
- Genus: Chamaita; Walker, 1862

Synonyms
- Homopsyche Butler, 1882

= Chamaita =

Genus of moths

Chamaita is a genus of moths in the subfamily Arctiinae. The genus was erected by Francis Walker in 1862. Species are distributed throughout India, Sri Lanka, and Borneo.

== Description ==
Palpi slight and porrect (extending forward). Antennae very long with thickened basal joint. Tibia with short spurs. Forewings with hairy and highly arched costa. In forewings, vein 3 from before angle of cell, vein 5 from near center of discocellulars and vein 6 from below upper angle. Veins 7 and 8 stalked, vein 9 absent and vein 11 not anastomosing (fusing) with vein 12. Hindwings with vein 3 before angle of cell, vein 5 from above angle, veins 6 and 7 stalked and vein 8 from middle of cell.

== Species ==
- Chamaita barnardi
- Chamaita celebensis
- Chamaita edelburga
- Chamaita fasciata
- Chamaita fascioterminata
- Chamaita fissa
- Chamaita hirta
- Chamaita metamelaena
- Chamaita neuropteroides
- Chamaita niveata
- Chamaita nubifera
- Chamaita nudarioides
- Chamaita nympha
- Chamaita psocidula
- Chamaita ranruna
- Chamaita semifasciata
- Chamaita sundanympha
- Chamaita trichopteroides
