= Chamaita niveata =

Scientific classification
- Domain: Eukaryota
- Kingdom: Animalia
- Phylum: Arthropoda
- Class: Insecta
- Order: Lepidoptera
- Superfamily: Noctuoidea
- Family: Erebidae
- Subfamily: Arctiinae
- Genus: Chamaita
- Species: C. niveata

Binomial name
- Chamaita niveata Rothschild, 1913

Species of moth

Chamaita niveata is a moth of the family Erebidae first described by Walter Rothschild in 1913. It is found in New Guinea.
