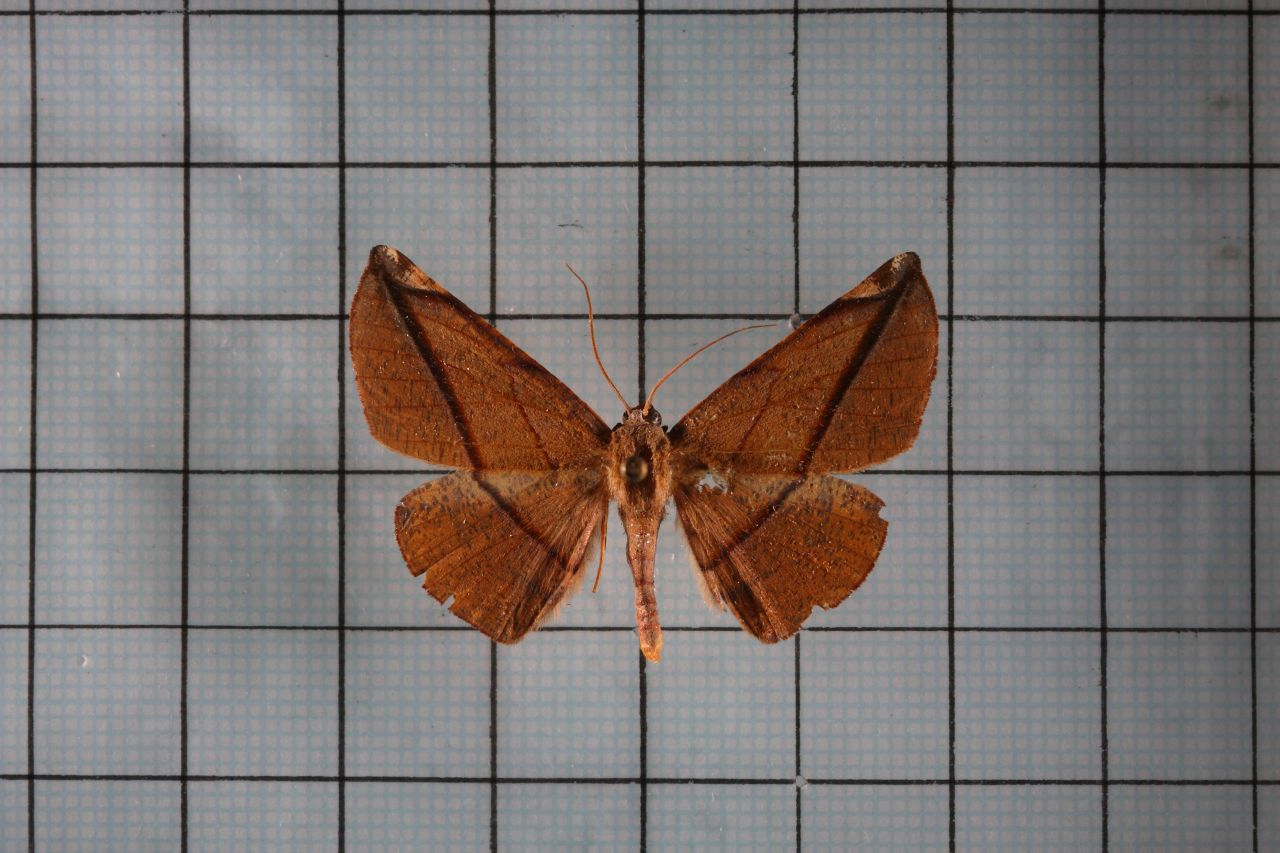

Scientific classification
- Kingdom: Animalia
- Phylum: Arthropoda
- Class: Insecta
- Order: Lepidoptera
- Family: Geometridae
- Genus: Pseudomiza
- Species: P. obliquaria

Binomial name
- Pseudomiza obliquaria (Leech, 1897)

Synonyms
- Auzea obliquaria Leech, 1897

= Pseudomiza obliquaria =

Species of moth

Pseudomiza obliquaria is a species of moth of the family Geometridae first described by John Henry Leech in 1897. It is found in Taiwan, China, Indochina and Bhutan.

The wingspan is 38–40 mm.
