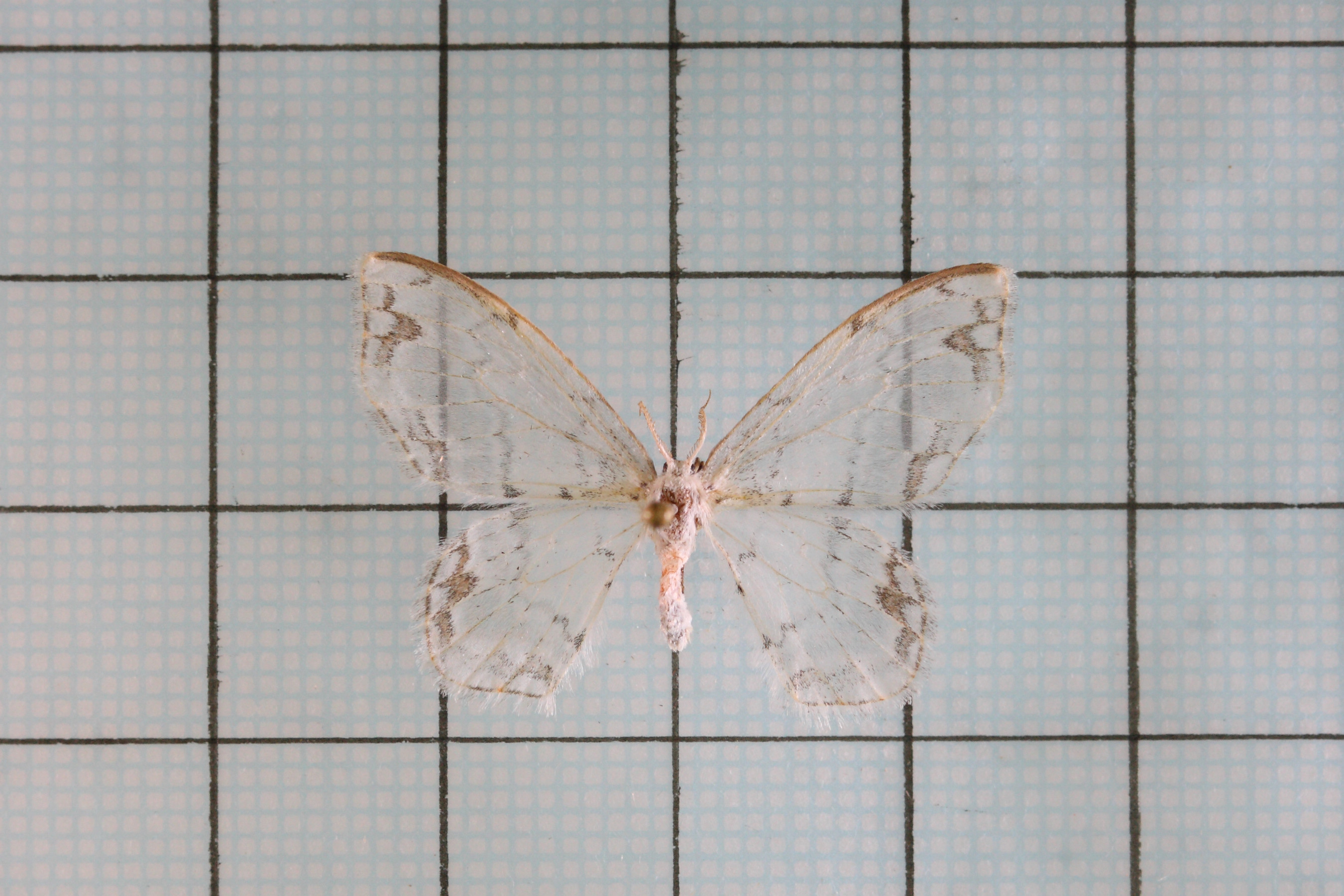
- Auzatellodes arizana

Scientific classification
- Domain: Eukaryota
- Kingdom: Animalia
- Phylum: Arthropoda
- Class: Insecta
- Order: Lepidoptera
- Superfamily: Drepanoidea
- Family: Drepanidae
- Subfamily: Drepaninae
- Tribe: Drepanini
- Genus: Auzatellodes; Strand, 1917

= Auzatellodes =

Moth genus in family Drepanidae

Auzatellodes is a genus of moths belonging to the subfamily Drepaninae.

== Species ==
- Auzatellodes arizana (Wileman, 1911)
- Auzatellodes hyalinata (Moore, [1868])
- Auzatellodes theafundum Holloway, 1998
