= Chamaita nudarioides =

Scientific classification
- Kingdom: Animalia
- Phylum: Arthropoda
- Class: Insecta
- Order: Lepidoptera
- Superfamily: Noctuoidea
- Family: Erebidae
- Subfamily: Arctiinae
- Genus: Chamaita
- Species: C. nudarioides

Binomial name
- Chamaita nudarioides (Butler, 1882)

Synonyms
- Homopsyche nudarioides Butler, 1882

Species of moth

Chamaita nudarioides is a moth of the family Erebidae. It is found on the Bismarck Islands.
