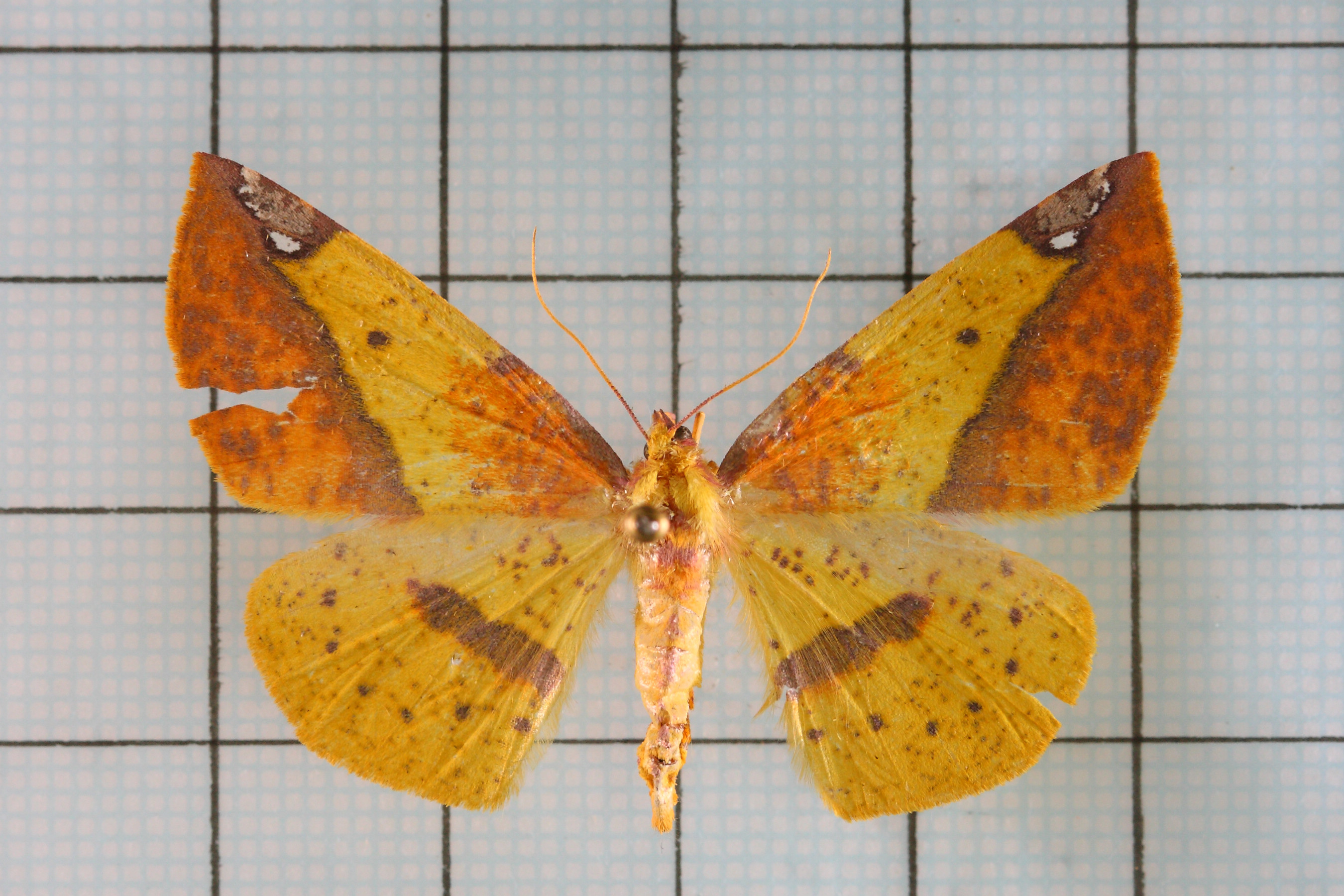
- Pseudomiza aurata

Scientific classification
- Domain: Eukaryota
- Kingdom: Animalia
- Phylum: Arthropoda
- Class: Insecta
- Order: Lepidoptera
- Family: Geometridae
- Subfamily: Ennominae
- Genus: Pseudomiza; Butler, 1889

Synonyms
- Heteromiza Warren, 1893

= Pseudomiza =

Genus of moths

Pseudomiza is a genus of moths in the family Geometridae.

== Species ==
- Pseudomiza annulata (Warren, 1899)
- Pseudomiza argentilinea (Moore, 1868)
- Pseudomiza aurata Wileman, 1915
- Pseudomiza castanearia (Moore, 1868)
- Pseudomiza ctenogyna Prout, 1916
- Pseudomiza flavitincta (Wileman, 1915)
- Pseudomiza leucogonia (Hampson, 1895)
- Pseudomiza obliquaria (Leech, 1897)
- Pseudomiza opaca Joicey & Talbot, 1917
- Pseudomiza punctinalis Beyer, 1958
- Pseudomiza uniformis Inoue, 1992
