= Chamaita nubifera =

Scientific classification
- Kingdom: Animalia
- Phylum: Arthropoda
- Class: Insecta
- Order: Lepidoptera
- Superfamily: Noctuoidea
- Family: Erebidae
- Subfamily: Arctiinae
- Genus: Chamaita
- Species: C. nubifera

Binomial name
- Chamaita nubifera Hampson, 1918

Species of moth

Chamaita nubifera is a moth of the family Erebidae first described by George Hampson in 1918. It is found in the Philippines.
