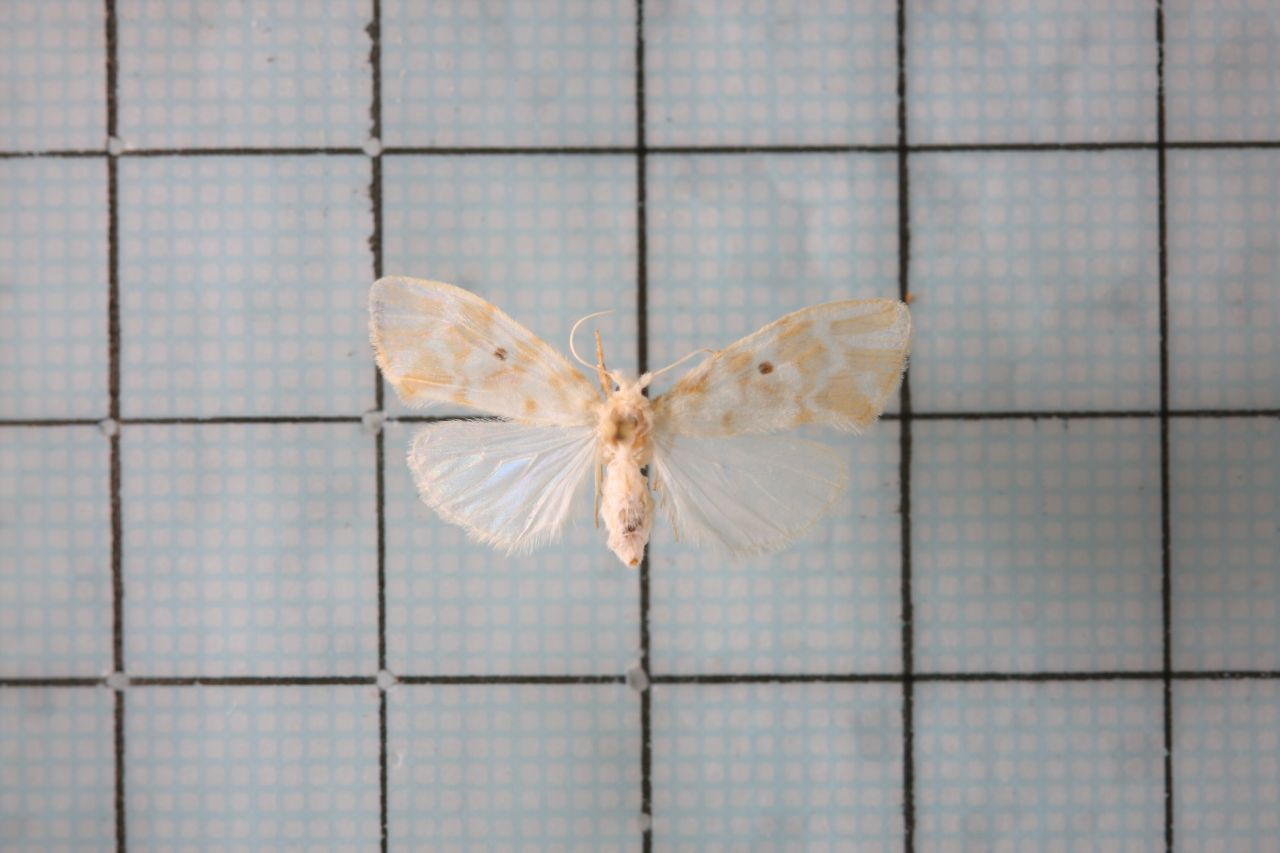

Scientific classification
- Domain: Eukaryota
- Kingdom: Animalia
- Phylum: Arthropoda
- Class: Insecta
- Order: Lepidoptera
- Superfamily: Noctuoidea
- Family: Erebidae
- Subfamily: Arctiinae
- Genus: Chamaita
- Species: C. ranruna

Binomial name
- Chamaita ranruna (Matsumura, 1927)

Synonyms
- Zobida ranruna Matsumura, 1927

= Chamaita ranruna =

Species of moth

Chamaita ranruna is a moth of the subfamily Arctiinae first described by Shōnen Matsumura in 1927. It is found in China, Taiwan, Borneo and Japan.

The wingspan is 20–25 mm. Adults are on wing in May.
