= Auzatellodes theafundum =

Scientific classification
- Kingdom: Animalia
- Phylum: Arthropoda
- Clade: Pancrustacea
- Class: Insecta
- Order: Lepidoptera
- Family: Drepanidae
- Genus: Auzatellodes
- Species: A. theafundum

Binomial name
- Auzatellodes theafundum Holloway, 1998

Species of hook-tip moth

Auzatellodes theafundum is a moth in the family Drepanidae. It was described by Jeremy Daniel Holloway in 1998. It is found on Peninsular Malaysia, Borneo and Sumatra. The habitat consists of lowland dipterocarp forests.
