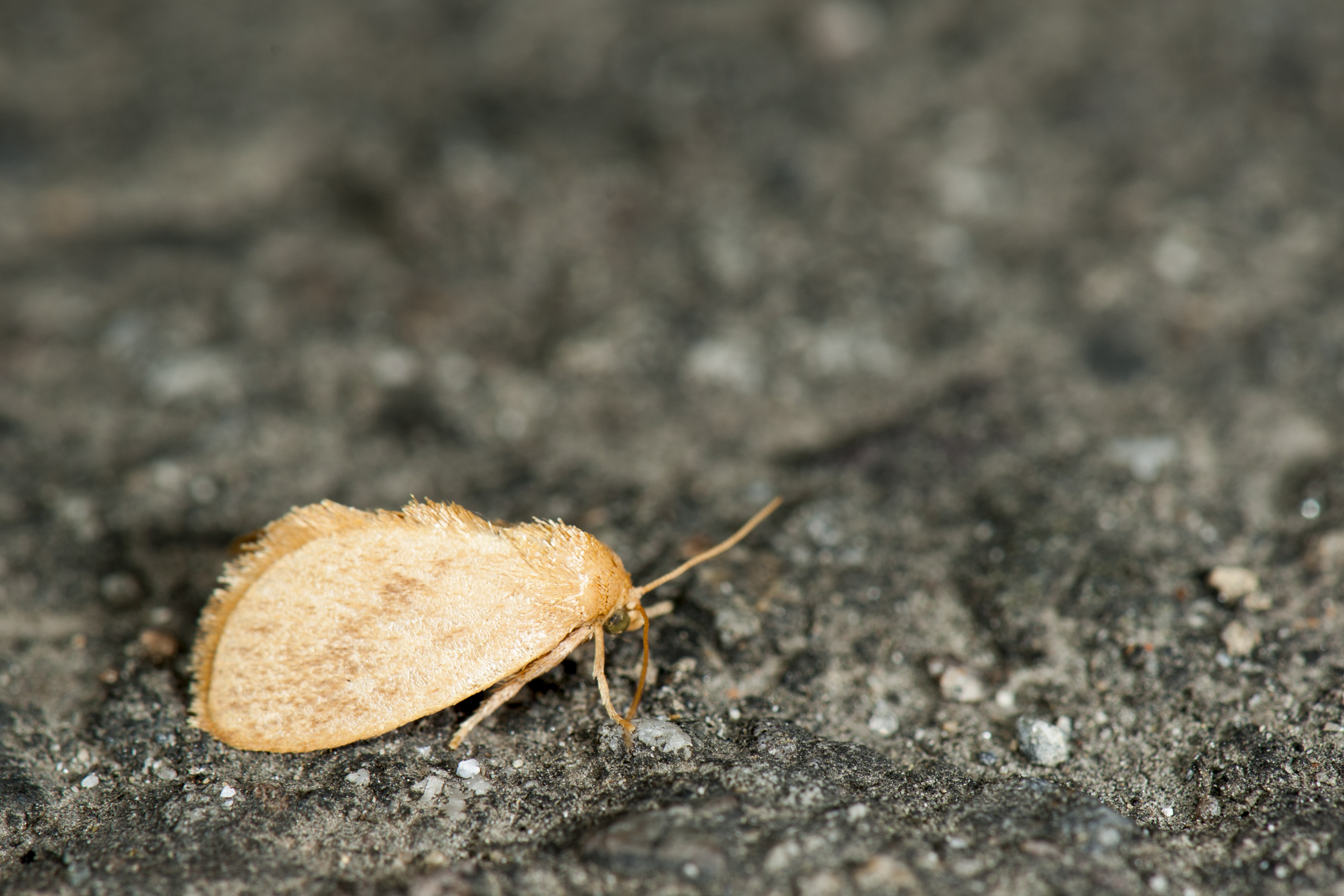

Scientific classification
- Kingdom: Animalia
- Phylum: Arthropoda
- Class: Insecta
- Order: Lepidoptera
- Family: Limacodidae
- Genus: Flavinarosa
- Species: F. obscura

Binomial name
- Flavinarosa obscura (Wileman, 1911)

Synonyms
- Narosa obscura Wileman, 1911

= Flavinarosa obscura =

Species of moth

Flavinarosa obscura is a moth in the family Limacodidae. It is found in Taiwan. The wingspan is 17–22 mm.

The moth was identified by British diplomat and entomologist Alfred Ernest Wileman in 1911.
