= Chamaita fissa =

Scientific classification
- Kingdom: Animalia
- Phylum: Arthropoda
- Clade: Pancrustacea
- Class: Insecta
- Order: Lepidoptera
- Superfamily: Noctuoidea
- Family: Erebidae
- Subfamily: Arctiinae
- Genus: Chamaita
- Species: C. fissa

Binomial name
- Chamaita fissa Černý, 2009

Species of moth

Chamaita fissa is a moth of the subfamily Arctiinae. It was described by Karel Černý in 2009.
