= Chamaita semifasciata =

Scientific classification
- Domain: Eukaryota
- Kingdom: Animalia
- Phylum: Arthropoda
- Class: Insecta
- Order: Lepidoptera
- Superfamily: Noctuoidea
- Family: Erebidae
- Subfamily: Arctiinae
- Genus: Chamaita
- Species: C. semifasciata

Binomial name
- Chamaita semifasciata Rothschild, 1916

Species of moth

Chamaita semifasciata is a moth of the family Erebidae. It is found on the Dampier Archipelago.
