= Hyalospectra dierli =

Scientific classification
- Kingdom: Animalia
- Phylum: Arthropoda
- Clade: Pancrustacea
- Class: Insecta
- Order: Lepidoptera
- Family: Drepanidae
- Genus: Hyalospectra
- Species: H. dierli

Binomial name
- Hyalospectra dierli Holloway, 1998

Species of hook-tip moth

Hyalospectra dierli is a moth in the family Drepanidae. It was described by Jeremy Daniel Holloway in 1998. It is found on Borneo and Peninsular Malaysia.
