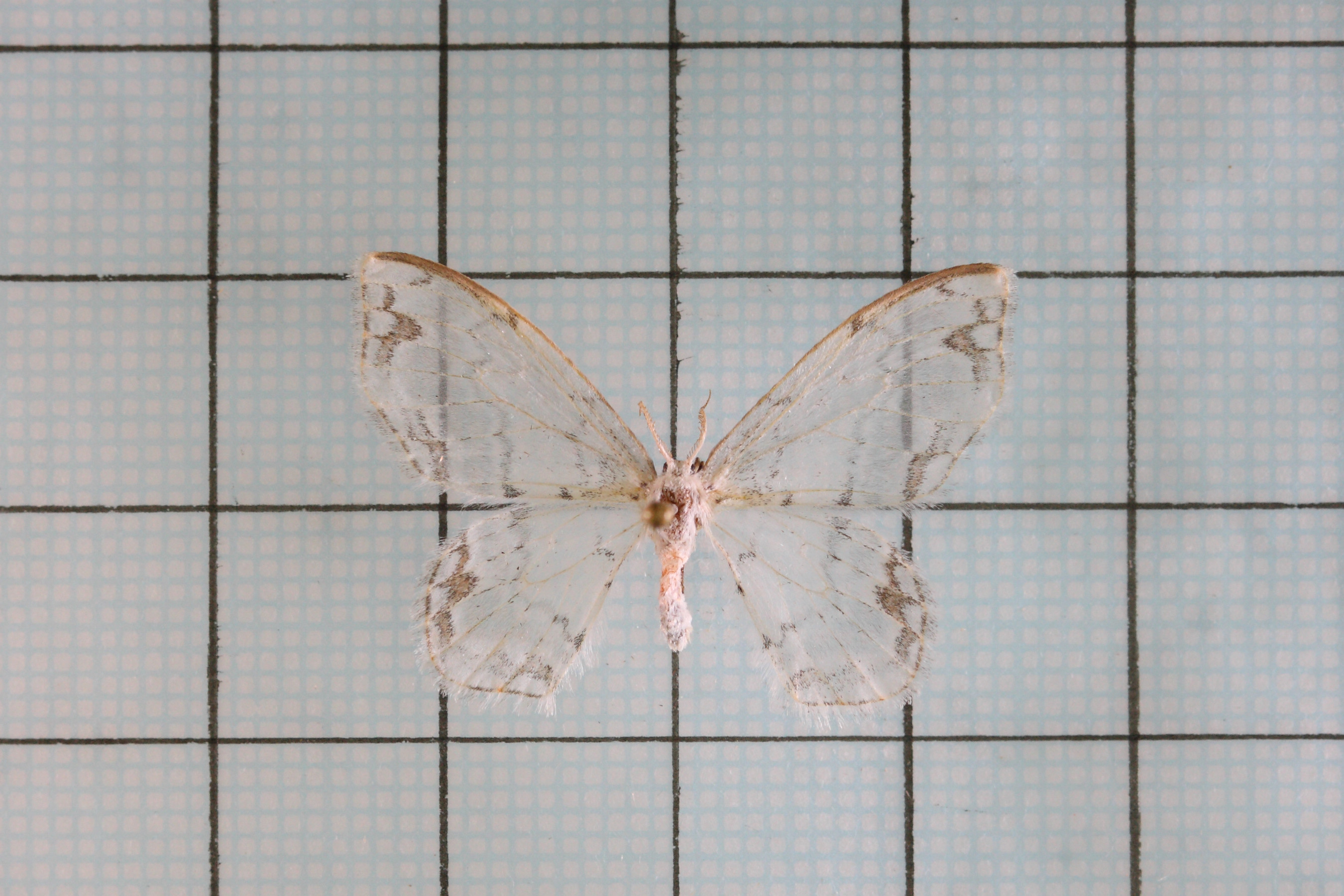

Scientific classification
- Kingdom: Animalia
- Phylum: Arthropoda
- Clade: Pancrustacea
- Class: Insecta
- Order: Lepidoptera
- Family: Drepanidae
- Genus: Auzatellodes
- Species: A. arizana

Binomial name
- Auzatellodes arizana (Wileman, 1911)

Synonyms
- Deroca arizana Wileman, 1911; Deroca arianus Wileman, 1911; Auzatellodes desquamata Strand, 1917; Hyalospectra arizana (Wileman, 1911); Auzatellodes arizanus (Wileman, 1911)

= Auzatellodes arizana =

Species of hook-tip moth

Auzatellodes arizana is a moth of the family Drepanidae. It was described by Alfred Ernest Wileman in 1911. It is endemic to Taiwan. The holotype was collected from "Arizan" (=Alishan) at 2,300 m (7,500 ft) above sea level.

== Taxonomy ==
Some sources list Auzatellodes arizana as a synonym of Auzatellodes desquamata, or only list the latter.

== Description ==
The wingspan is 23–29 mm. Adults are on wing from May to July.
