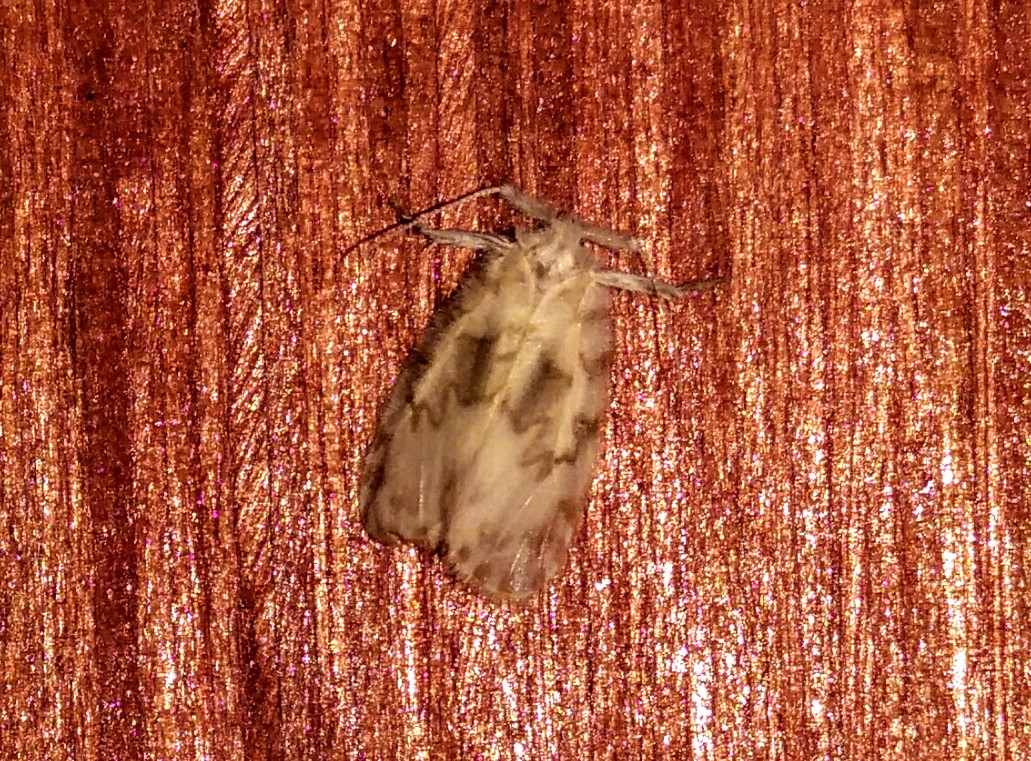

Scientific classification
- Domain: Eukaryota
- Kingdom: Animalia
- Phylum: Arthropoda
- Class: Insecta
- Order: Lepidoptera
- Superfamily: Noctuoidea
- Family: Erebidae
- Subfamily: Arctiinae
- Genus: Chamaita
- Species: C. nympha

Binomial name
- Chamaita nympha (Moore, 1887)

Synonyms
- Homopsyche nympha Moore, 1887

= Chamaita nympha =

Species of moth

Chamaita nympha is a moth of the family Erebidae. It is found in Sri Lanka.

== Description ==
Its wingspan is about 18 mm. Palpi slight and porrect (extending forward). Antennae very long with thickened basal joint. Tibia with short spurs. Forewings with hairy and highly arched costa. In forewings, vein 3 from before angle of cell, vein 5 from near center of discocellulars and vein 6 from below upper angle. Veins 7 and 8 stalked, vein 9 absent, but vein 10 present. Vein 11 not anastomosing (fusing) with vein 12. Hindwings with vein 3 before angle of cell, vein 5 from above angle, veins 6 and 7 stalked and vein 8 from middle of cell. Female has a fulvous spot at center of cell of forewing.
