= Pseudomiza argentilinea =

Scientific classification
- Domain: Eukaryota
- Kingdom: Animalia
- Phylum: Arthropoda
- Class: Insecta
- Order: Lepidoptera
- Family: Geometridae
- Genus: Pseudomiza
- Species: P. argentilinea

Binomial name
- Pseudomiza argentilinea (Moore, 1868)

Synonyms
- Drepanodes argentilinea Moore, 1868

Species of moth

Pseudomiza argentilinea is a species of moth of the family Geometridae first described by Frederic Moore in 1868. It is found in Taiwan, China, Myanmar and India.

== Subspecies ==
- Pseudomiza argentilinea argentilinea
- Pseudomiza argentilinea changi Wang, 1998 (Taiwan)
- Pseudomiza argentilinea eugraphes Prout, 1923 (Burma)
