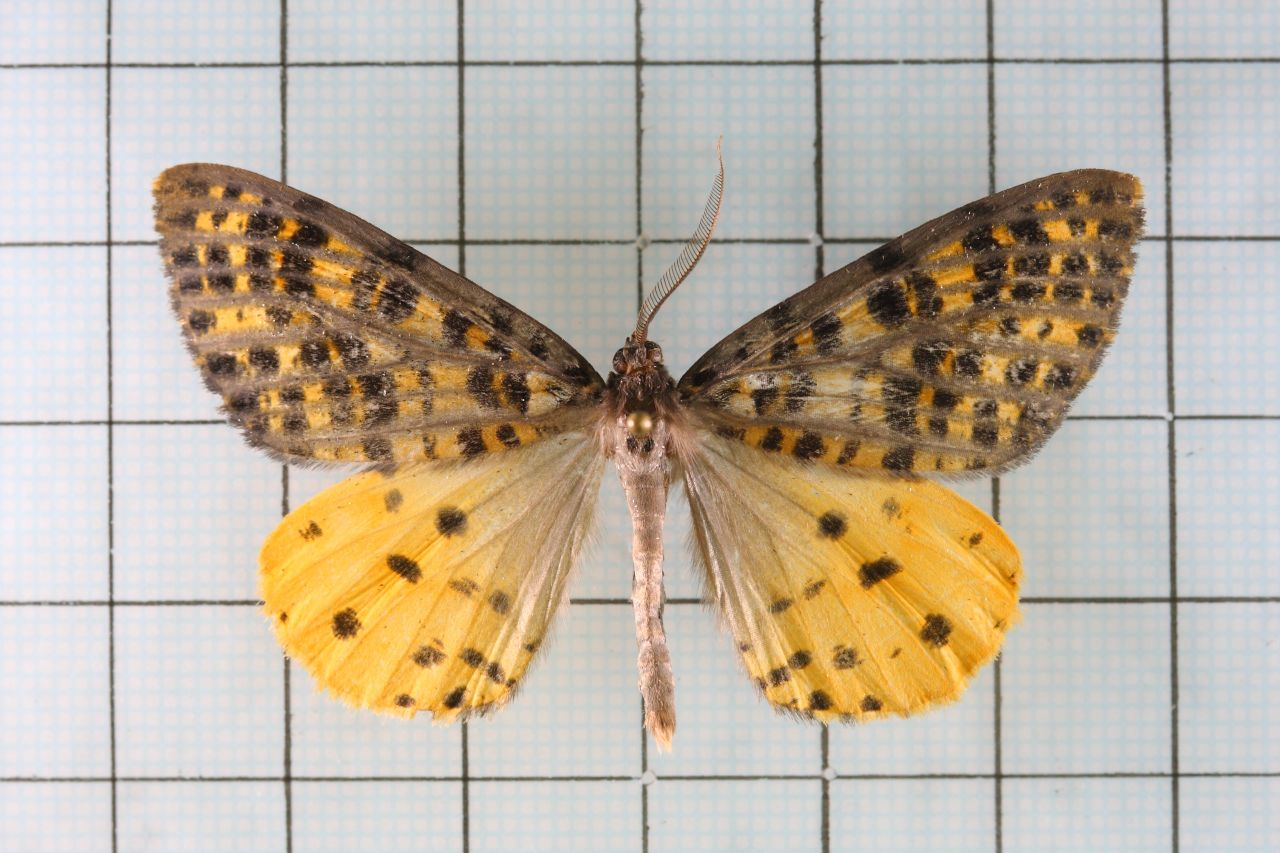

Scientific classification
- Domain: Eukaryota
- Kingdom: Animalia
- Phylum: Arthropoda
- Class: Insecta
- Order: Lepidoptera
- Family: Geometridae
- Subfamily: Ennominae
- Tribe: Boarmiini
- Genus: Arichanna
- Species: A. sinica

Binomial name
- Arichanna sinica Wehrli, 1933

Synonyms
- Epicterodes sinica Wehrli, 1933; Arichanna himalayensis Inoue, 1970; Arichanna refracta

= Arichanna sinica =

Species of moth

Arichanna sinica is a moth of the family Geometridae. It is found in Taiwan, Bhutan and China.

The wingspan is 44–56 mm.

== Subspecies ==
- Arichanna sinica sinica
- Arichanna sinica refracta Inoue, 1978 (Taiwan)
