= Chamaita trichopteroides =

Scientific classification
- Kingdom: Animalia
- Phylum: Arthropoda
- Class: Insecta
- Order: Lepidoptera
- Superfamily: Noctuoidea
- Family: Erebidae
- Subfamily: Arctiinae
- Genus: Chamaita
- Species: C. trichopteroides

Binomial name
- Chamaita trichopteroides Walker, 1862

Synonyms
- Chamaita chrysopides van Eecke, 1926

Species of moth

Chamaita trichopteroides is a moth of the family Erebidae. It is found on Sumatra and Borneo. The habitat consists of lower montane areas and lowland forests.

The wingspan is about 23 mm. The forewings are transparent with light brownish yellow markings. The hindwings are transparent white.
