= Chamaita edelburga =

Scientific classification
- Domain: Eukaryota
- Kingdom: Animalia
- Phylum: Arthropoda
- Class: Insecta
- Order: Lepidoptera
- Superfamily: Noctuoidea
- Family: Erebidae
- Subfamily: Arctiinae
- Genus: Chamaita
- Species: C. edelburga

Binomial name
- Chamaita edelburga Schaus, 1924

Species of moth

Chamaita edelburga is a moth of the family Erebidae. It was described by Schaus in 1924. It is found on the Philippines (Luzon).

The wingspan is about 23 mm. The forewings are white with pinkish buff markings. The hindwings are white and semihyaline, the costa tinged with opalescent pale vinaceous lilac, the rest of the wing tinged with light sky blue.
