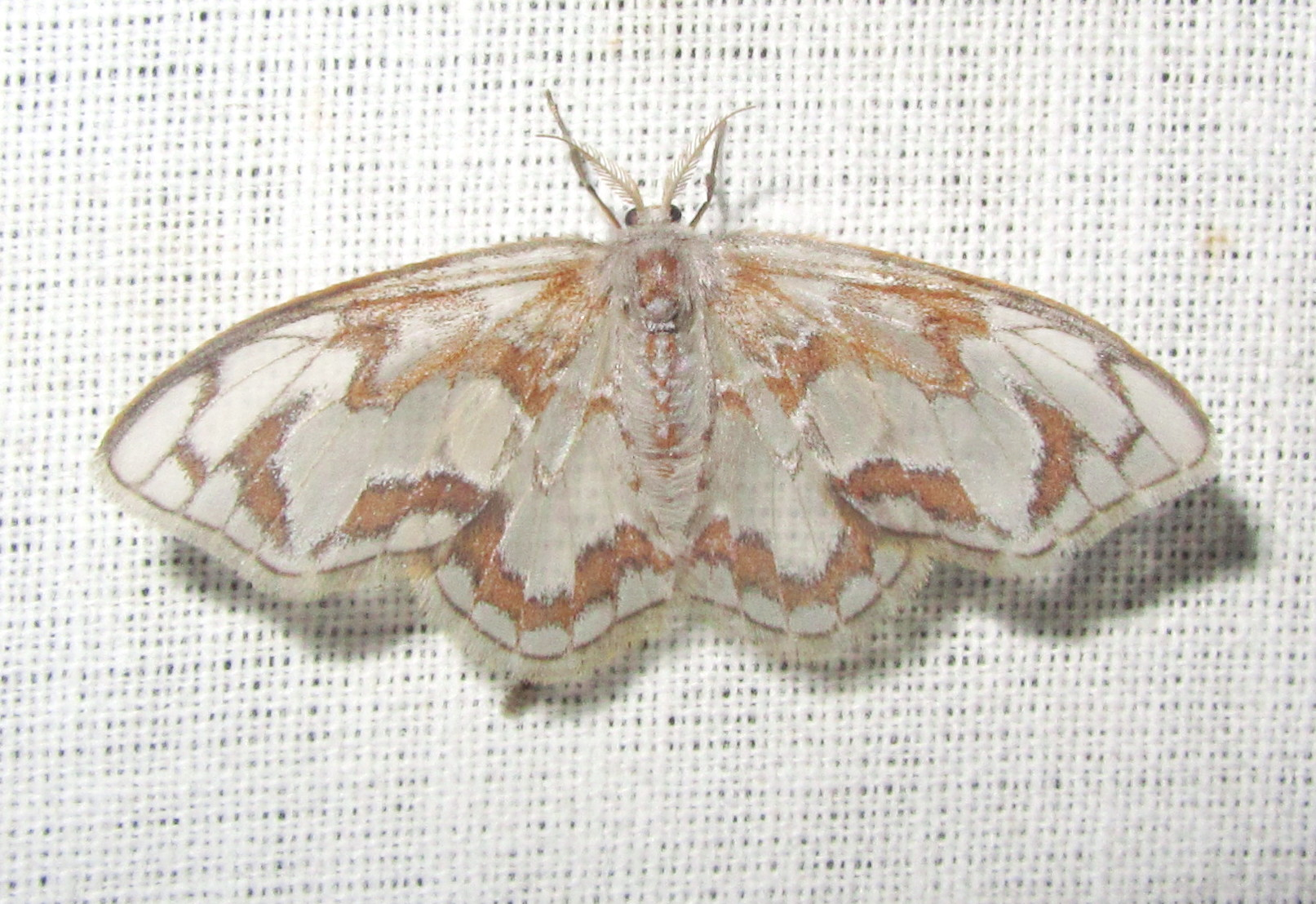

Scientific classification
- Domain: Eukaryota
- Kingdom: Animalia
- Phylum: Arthropoda
- Class: Insecta
- Order: Lepidoptera
- Family: Drepanidae
- Genus: Auzatellodes
- Species: A. hyalinata

Binomial name
- Auzatellodes hyalinata (Moore, [1868])

Synonyms
- Comibaena hyalinata Moore, [1868]; Hyalospectra hyalinata; Hyalospectra postfasciata Bryk, 1943

= Auzatellodes hyalinata =

Species of hook-tip moth

Auzatellodes hyalinata is a moth in the family Drepanidae. It was described by Frederic Moore in 1868. It is found in the north-eastern Himalayas, Sikkim, Burma and northern Yunnan in China.

Adults are purplish hyaline (glass like), the forewings with an imperfect basal and subbasal band with a discal point, and an irregular submarginal band with a reddish-brown inner or reverse discal point, crossing both the wings. The reddish-brown colour extends along the veins and the outer marginal border line, dividing a row of white lunules.
