= Alfred Ernest Wileman =

British diplomat and entomologist

Alfred Ernest Wileman (27 February 1860 – 15 February 1929) was a British diplomat and entomologist.

Wileman was appointed as the British Vice Consul for the Japanese city of Hakodate and surrounding prefectures in April 1901, and moved to be consul to Taiwan in 1903, and to the then Territory of Hawaii in 1908. In 1909, he was appointed Consul-General to the Philippines (then a United States territory).

Wileman was an accomplished amateur lepidopterist. He is credited with identifying in 1911 Flavinarosa obscura, which is found in Japan.
