= List of moths of Canada (Nolidae) =

Partial list of Canadian moths

This is a list of the moths of family Nolidae that are found in Canada. It also acts as an index to the species articles and forms part of the full List of moths of Canada.

Following the species name, there is an abbreviation that indicates the Canadian provinces or territories in which the species can be found.

- Western Canada
  - BC = British Columbia
  - AB = Alberta
  - SK = Saskatchewan
  - MB = Manitoba
  - YT = Yukon
  - NT = Northwest Territories
  - NT = Nunavut
- Eastern Canada
  - ON = Ontario
  - QC = Quebec
  - NB = New Brunswick
  - NS = Nova Scotia
  - PE = Prince Edward Island
  - NF = Newfoundland
  - LB = Labrador

== Subfamily Chloephorinae ==
- Characoma nilotica (Rogenhofer, 1881)-ON, QC, NS
- Nycteola cinereana Neumoegen & Dyar, 1893-BC, AB, MB, ON, QC, NF
- Nycteola columbiana (Edwards, 1873)-BC
- Nycteola frigidana (Walker, 1863)-BC, AB, MB, NT, ON, QC, NB, NS, NF
- Nycteola metaspilella (Walker, 1866)-ON

== Subfamily Nolinae ==
- Meganola minuscula (Zeller, 1872)-BC, SK, MB, ON, QC, NB, NS
- Meganola spodia Franclemont, 1985-ON, QC
- Nola cilicoides (Grote, 1873)-AB, SK, MB, ON, QC, NB, NS
- Nola ovilla Grote, 1875-ON, QC
- Nola minna Butler, 1881-BC
- Nola triquetrana (Fitch, 1856)-ON, QC, NS

== Subfamily Risobinae ==
- Baileya australis (Grote, 1881)-ON, QC
- Baileya dormitans (Guenée, 1852)-ON, QC
- Baileya doubledayi (Guenée, 1852)-SK, MB, ON, QC, NB, NS
- Baileya levitans (Smith, 1906)-ON, QC
- Baileya ophthalmica (Guenée, 1852)-AB, SK, MB, ON, QC, NB, NS
