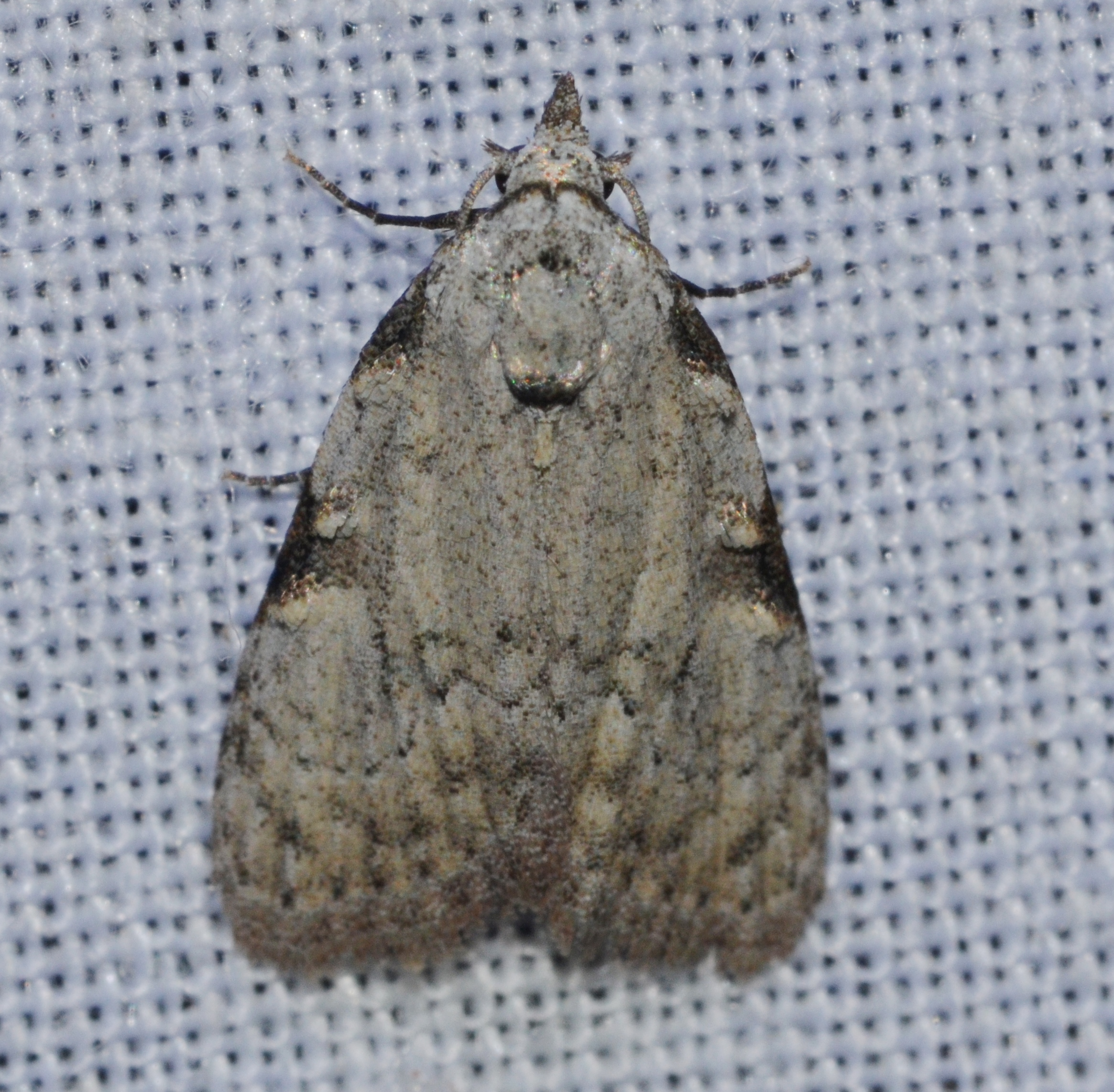

Scientific classification
- Kingdom: Animalia
- Phylum: Arthropoda
- Class: Insecta
- Order: Lepidoptera
- Superfamily: Noctuoidea
- Family: Nolidae
- Genus: Meganola
- Species: M. phylla

Binomial name
- Meganola phylla (Dyar, 1898)

Synonyms
- Nola phylla Dyar, 1898

= Meganola phylla =

Species of moth

Meganola phylla, the coastal plain meganola moth, is a moth of the family Nolidae. It is found in North America, where it has been recorded from Alabama, Florida, Georgia, Illinois, Indiana, Maine, Maryland, Mississippi, New Jersey, North Carolina, Ohio, Oklahoma, Ontario, South Carolina, Tennessee, Virginia and West Virginia.

The wingspan is 18–24 mm. Adults have been recorded on wing from January to October, but are mainly found between April and August.

The larvae feed on Quercus species.

== Taxonomy ==
It was previously listed as a subspecies or even colour variant of Meganola minuscula.
