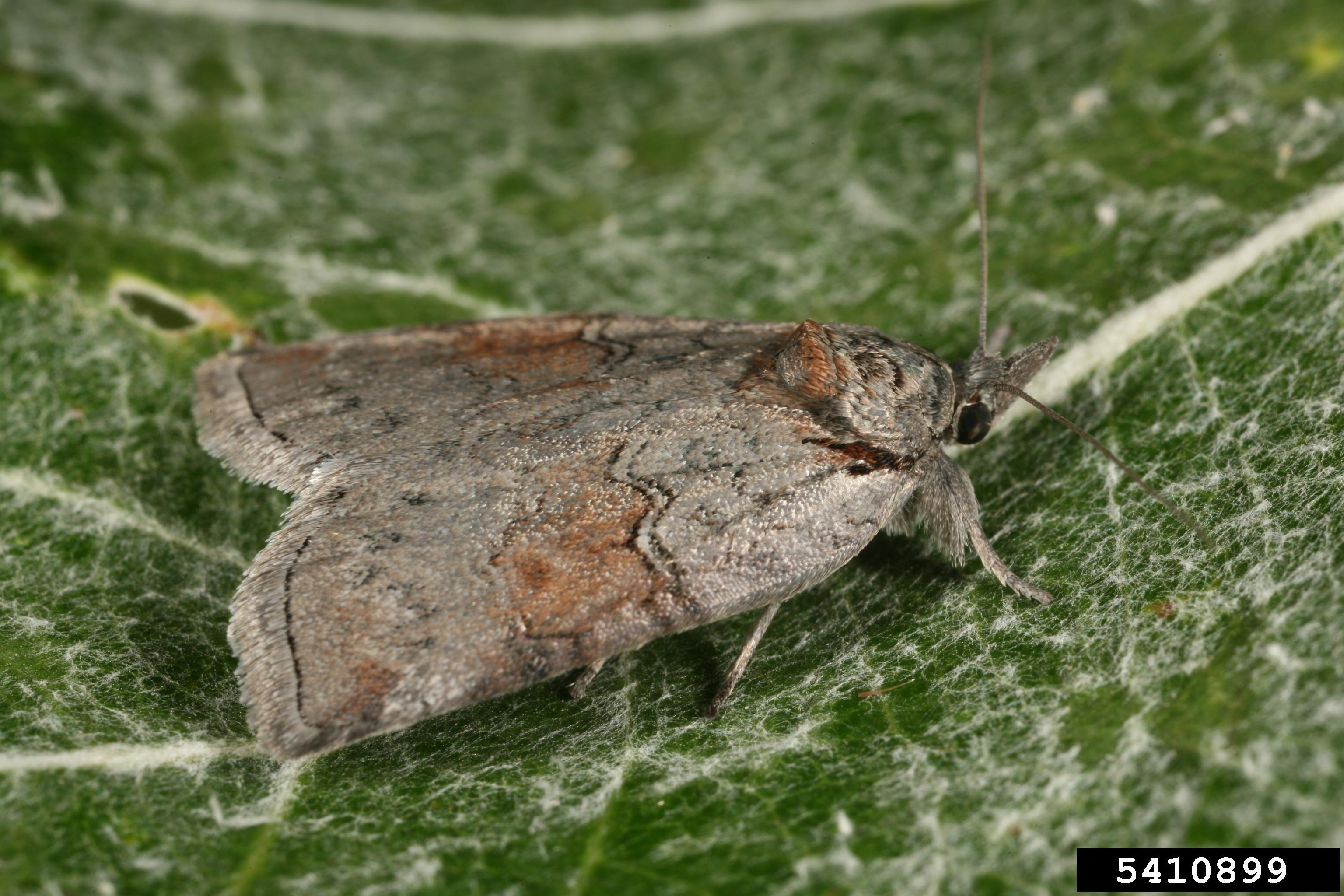

Scientific classification
- Kingdom: Animalia
- Phylum: Arthropoda
- Clade: Pancrustacea
- Class: Insecta
- Order: Lepidoptera
- Superfamily: Noctuoidea
- Family: Nolidae
- Genus: Nycteola
- Species: N. asiatica

Binomial name
- Nycteola asiatica (Krulikovsky, 1904)

Synonyms
- Sarrothripus populana; Sarrothripus hungarica; Nycteola pseudasiatica

= Nycteola asiatica =

Species of moth

Nycteola asiatica, the eastern nycteoline, is a moth of the family Nolidae. The species was first described by Leonid Konstantinovich Krulikovsky in 1904. It is found in most of Europe and east across the Palearctic to Japan.

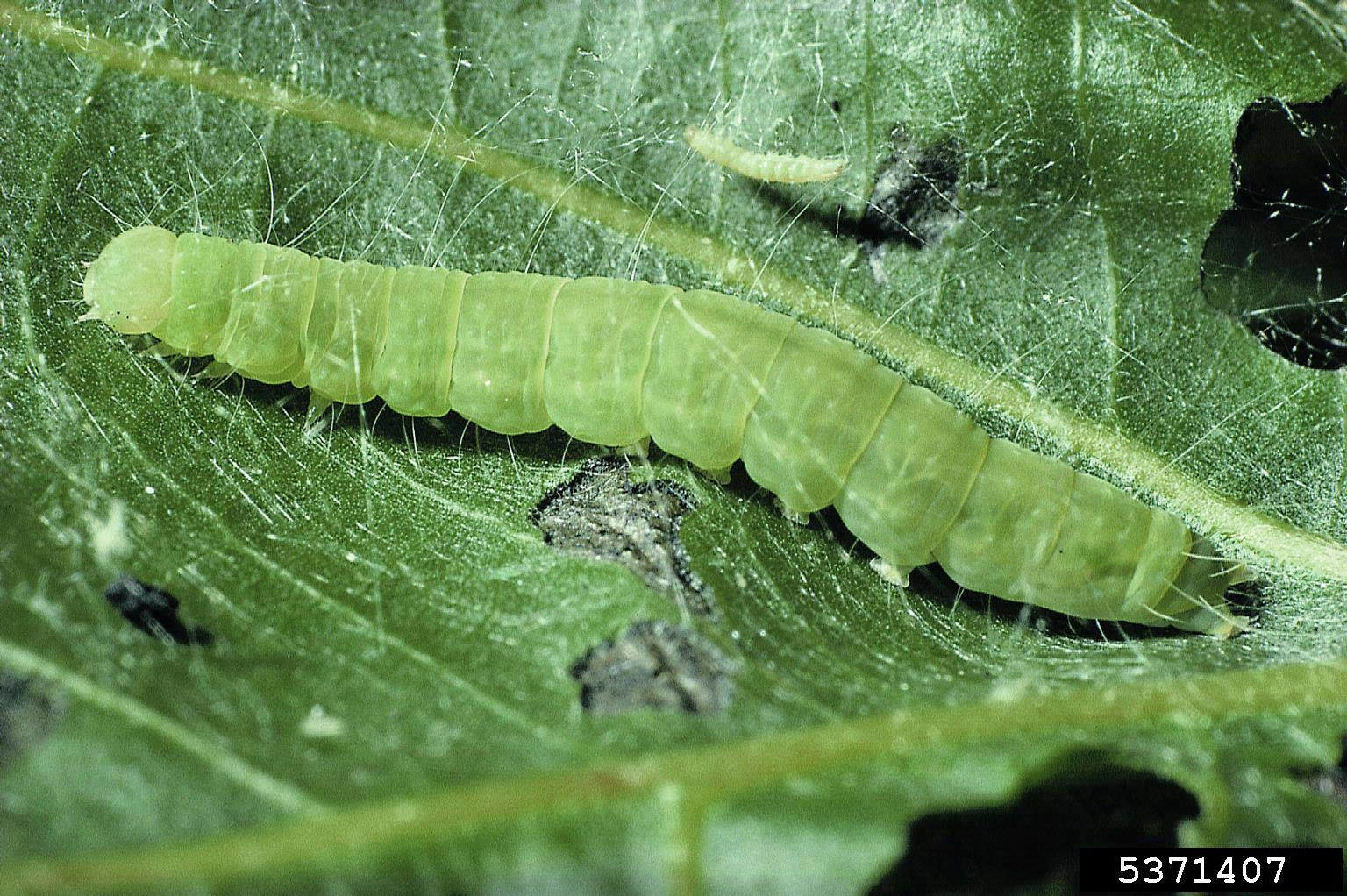
Caterpillar

The wingspan is 22–25 mm. It closely resembles Nycteola revayana and is separable only by genitalic characters. The moth flies in two generations from mid-June to September and from March to April depending on the location.

The larvae feed on Salix and Populus species.
