= Meganola conspicua =

Scientific classification
- Kingdom: Animalia
- Phylum: Arthropoda
- Class: Insecta
- Order: Lepidoptera
- Superfamily: Noctuoidea
- Family: Nolidae
- Genus: Meganola
- Species: M. conspicua

Binomial name
- Meganola conspicua Dyar, 1898

Species of moth

Meganola conspicua, the conspicuous meganola moth, is a species of nolid moth in the family Nolidae. It is found in North America.

The MONA or Hodges number for Meganola conspicua is 8988.
