= Nycteola fletcheri =

Scientific classification
- Kingdom: Animalia
- Phylum: Arthropoda
- Class: Insecta
- Order: Lepidoptera
- Superfamily: Noctuoidea
- Family: Nolidae
- Genus: Nycteola
- Species: N. fletcheri

Binomial name
- Nycteola fletcheri Rindge, 1961

Species of moth

Nycteola fletcheri is a species of nolid moth in the family Nolidae. It is found in North America.

The MONA or Hodges number for Nycteola fletcheri is 8979.
