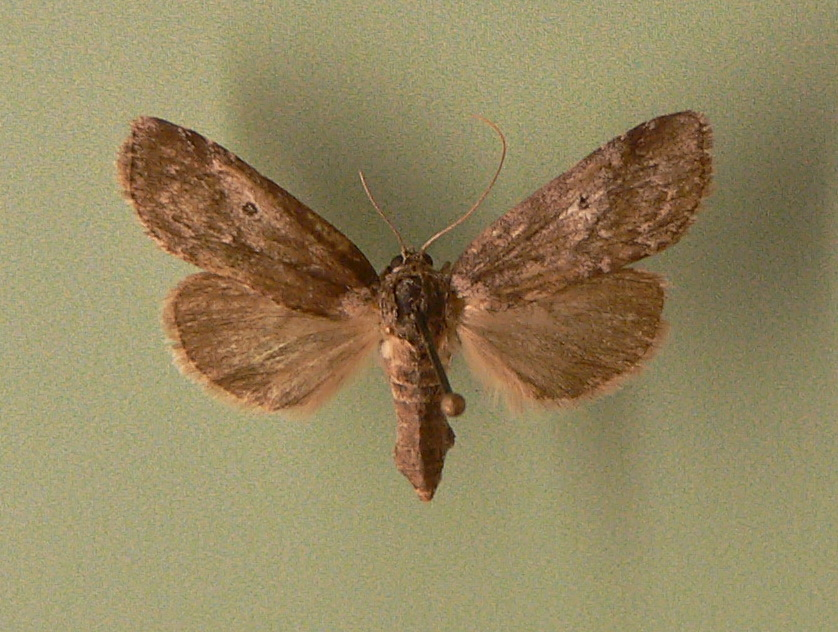
- Baileya ellessyoo

Scientific classification
- Domain: Eukaryota
- Kingdom: Animalia
- Phylum: Arthropoda
- Class: Insecta
- Order: Lepidoptera
- Superfamily: Noctuoidea
- Family: Nolidae
- Subfamily: Risobinae
- Genus: Baileya; Grote, 1895

Synonyms
- Brabantia Dyar, 1913; Leptina Guenée, 1852

= Baileya (moth) =

Genus of moths

Baileya is a genus of moths of the family Nolidae. The genus was erected by Augustus Radcliffe Grote in 1895.

== Species ==
- Baileya acadiana Brou, 2004
- Baileya aphanes Dyar, 1920
- Baileya australis (Grote, 1881)
- Baileya dormitans (Guenée, 1852)
- Baileya doubledayi (Guenée, 1852)
- Baileya ellessyoo Brou, 2004
- Baileya levitans (Smith, 1906)
- Baileya ophthalmica (Guenée, 1852)
- Baileya restitans Dyar, 1913
