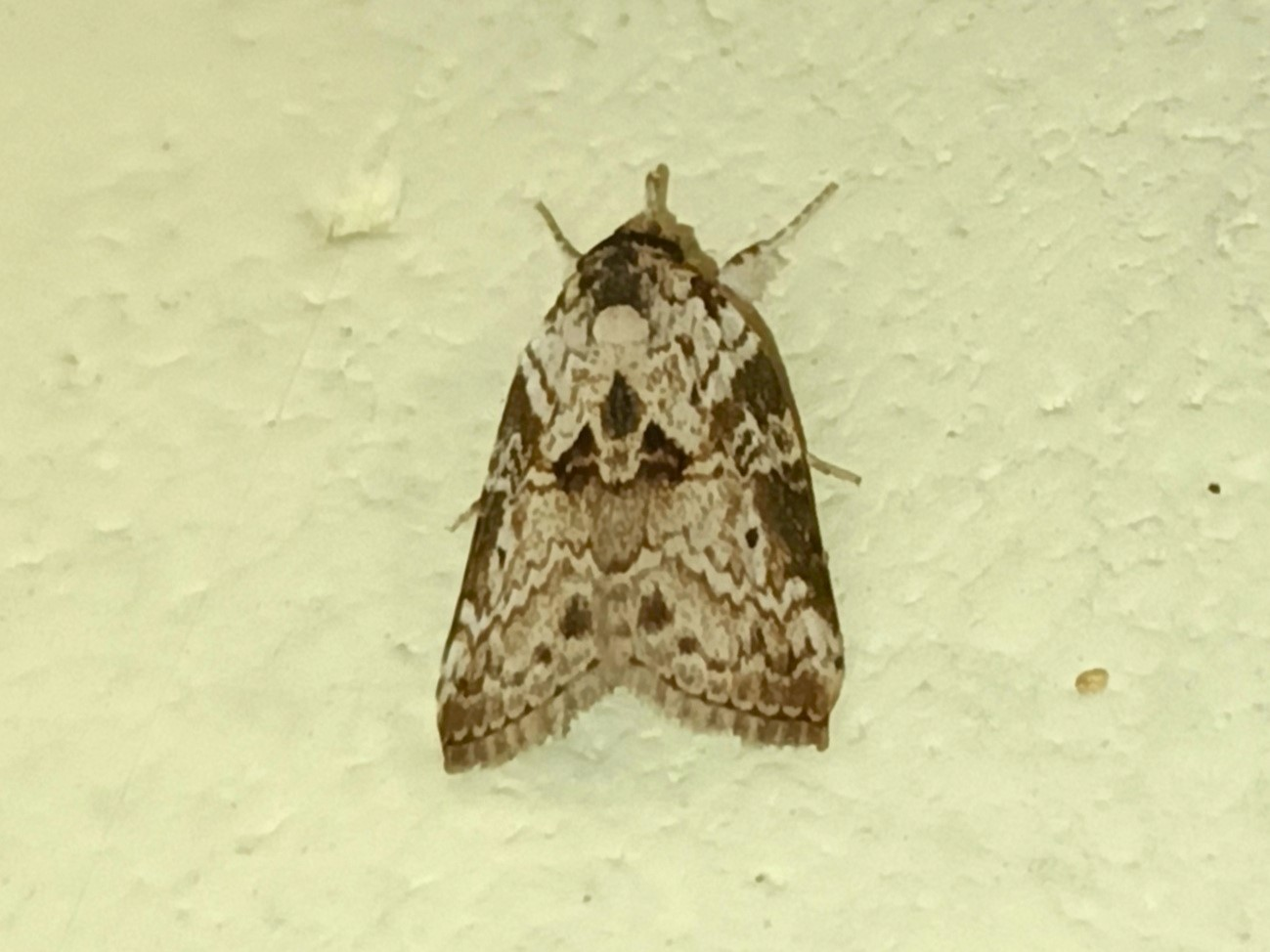

Scientific classification
- Kingdom: Animalia
- Phylum: Arthropoda
- Class: Insecta
- Order: Lepidoptera
- Superfamily: Noctuoidea
- Family: Nolidae
- Genus: Nycteola
- Species: N. indicatana

Binomial name
- Nycteola indicatana (Walker, 1863)

Synonyms
- Tortrix indicatana Walker, 1863; Subrita? parvella Walker, 1866; Gyrtothripa microdonta Hampson, 1912; Symitha indicatana ferrugana Fletcher, 1957

= Nycteola indicatana =

Species of moth

Nycteola indicatana is a moth of the family Nolidae first described by Francis Walker in 1863. It is found in the Indian subregion, Sri Lanka, Singapore, Borneo, Java and the Solomon Islands.

== Description ==
Forewings pale gray with irregular transverse dark gray fasciation. A central triangle and a dark sub-basal bar found in the costa. A submarginal row of darker dots present. Posterior dots are large. The caterpillar has a pale green and yellowish-green body. Whitish primary setae arise from white dots. A pale spiracular line and faint dark dorsal line visible. Pupation occurs in a canoe-shaped pure white silken cocoon.

Larval host plants are Eugenia, Lagerstroemia and Syzygium.

== Subspecies ==
Four subspecies are recognized.

- N. i. indicatana - Indian subregion, Sri Lanka
- N. i. microdonta - Singapore, Borneo
- N. i. parvella - Java
- N. i. ferrugana - Solomon Islands
