= Meganola varia =

Scientific classification
- Domain: Eukaryota
- Kingdom: Animalia
- Phylum: Arthropoda
- Class: Insecta
- Order: Lepidoptera
- Superfamily: Noctuoidea
- Family: Nolidae
- Genus: Meganola
- Species: M. varia

Binomial name
- Meganola varia (Barnes & Lindsey, 1921)

Synonyms
- Roeselia varia Barnes & Lindsey, 1921; Roeselia extusata Dyar, 1923

Species of moth

Meganola varia is a species of moth in the family Nolidae and superfamily Noctuoidea.

The species was first described by William Barnes and Arthur Ward Lindsey in 1921. It is found naturally in North America, where it has been recorded throughout Arizona, New Mexico, and western Texas. While some moths of its species have reportedly been photographed in California, Meganola varia is not found on the California Moth Checklist.

Its wingspan ranges from 26–32 millimeters. Adults typically have dark gray or brownish gray coloration with a white speckling (irroration) that occurs as a result of the white tips on some its scales. Adults have a flight period of June to October.

The MONA (Hodges) number for Meganola varia is 8987.
