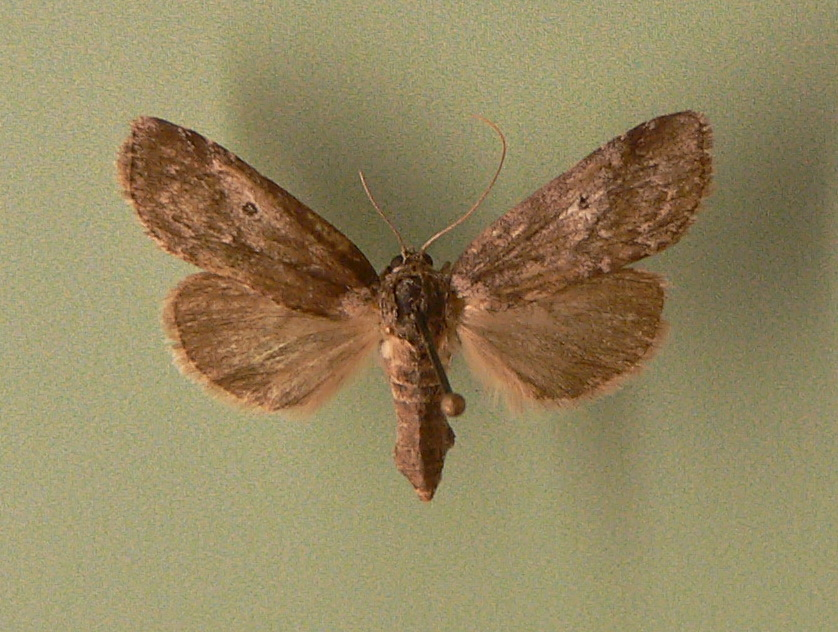

Scientific classification
- Domain: Eukaryota
- Kingdom: Animalia
- Phylum: Arthropoda
- Class: Insecta
- Order: Lepidoptera
- Superfamily: Noctuoidea
- Family: Nolidae
- Genus: Baileya
- Species: B. ellessyoo

Binomial name
- Baileya ellessyoo Brou, 2004

= Baileya ellessyoo =

Species of moth

Baileya ellessyoo is a moth of the family Nolidae first described by Vernon Antoine Brou Jr. in 2004. It is found in the US states of Alabama, Florida, Georgia, Louisiana, Mississippi, Missouri, North Carolina and Texas.

Adults are on wing from March to April in one generation in Louisiana.
