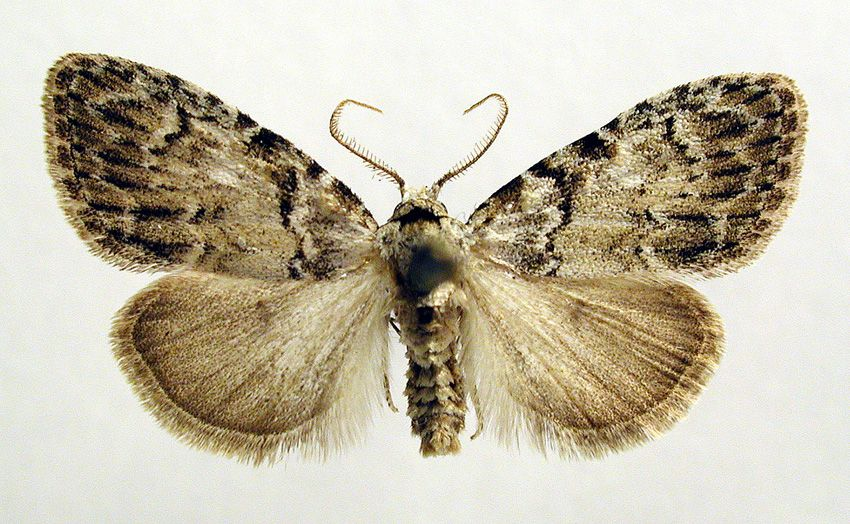

Scientific classification
- Kingdom: Animalia
- Phylum: Arthropoda
- Clade: Pancrustacea
- Class: Insecta
- Order: Lepidoptera
- Superfamily: Noctuoidea
- Family: Nolidae
- Genus: Meganola
- Species: M. strigula

Binomial name
- Meganola strigula (Denis & Schiffermüller, 1775)

Synonyms
- Noctua strigula Denis & Schiffermüller, 1775; Phalaena asperalis Viler, 1789; Pyralis strigularis Hübner, 1796; Phalaena corticosa Vallot, 1802; Pyralis monachalis Haworth, 1811; Nola monachalis (Haworth, 1811); Roeselia strigulana Hübner, [1825]; Nola lineolalis Eversmann, 1844; Roeselia strigula kolbi Daniel, 1935; Roeselia pannonica Kovács, 1947

= Meganola strigula =

Species of moth

Meganola strigula, the small black arches, is a moth of the family Nolidae. The species was first described by Michael Denis and Ignaz Schiffermüller in 1775. It is found in Europe, Russia and Asia Minor.

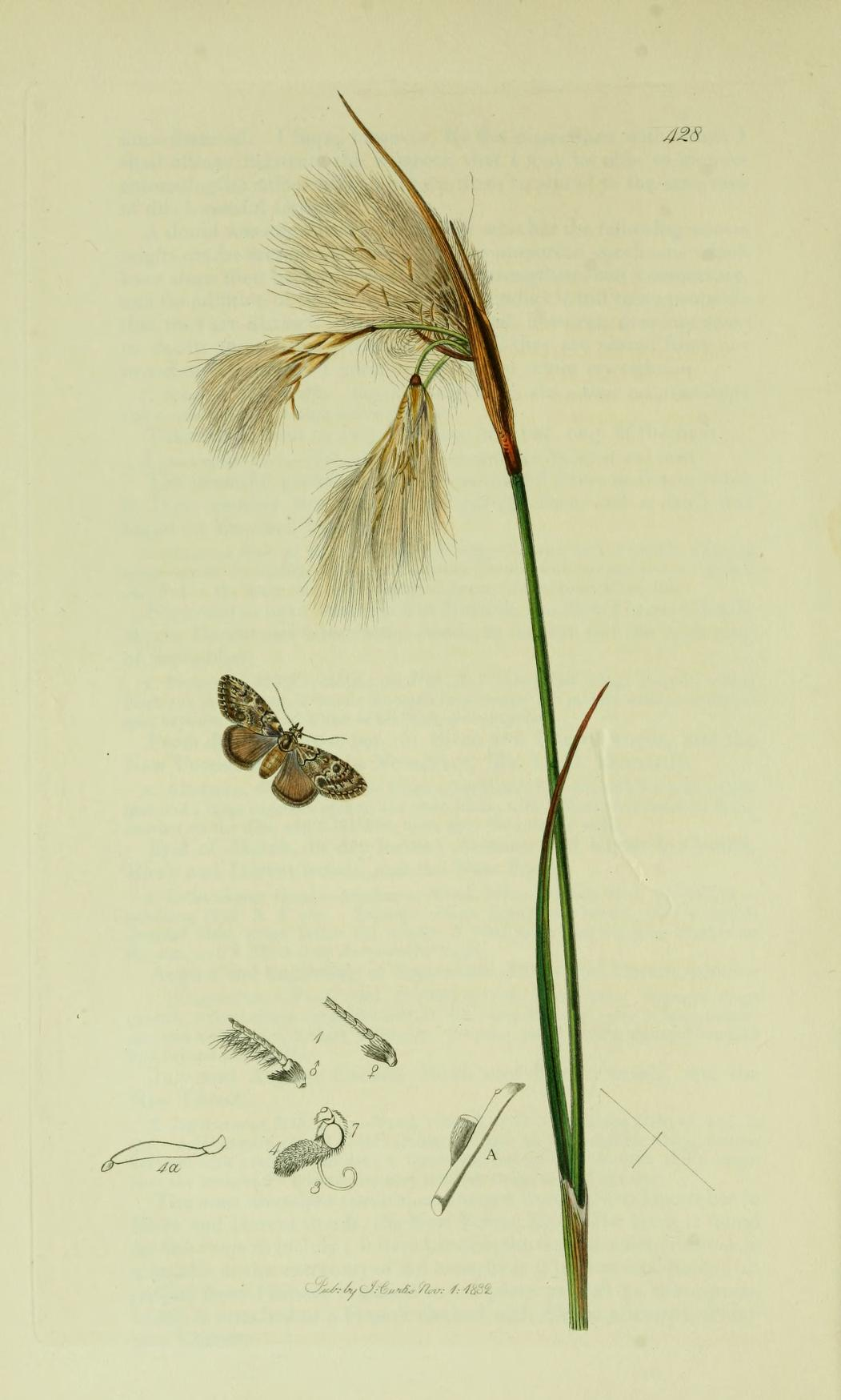
Illustration from John Curtis's British Entomology Volume 6

The wingspan is 18–24 mm. Adults are on wing from June to July and can be attracted to light.

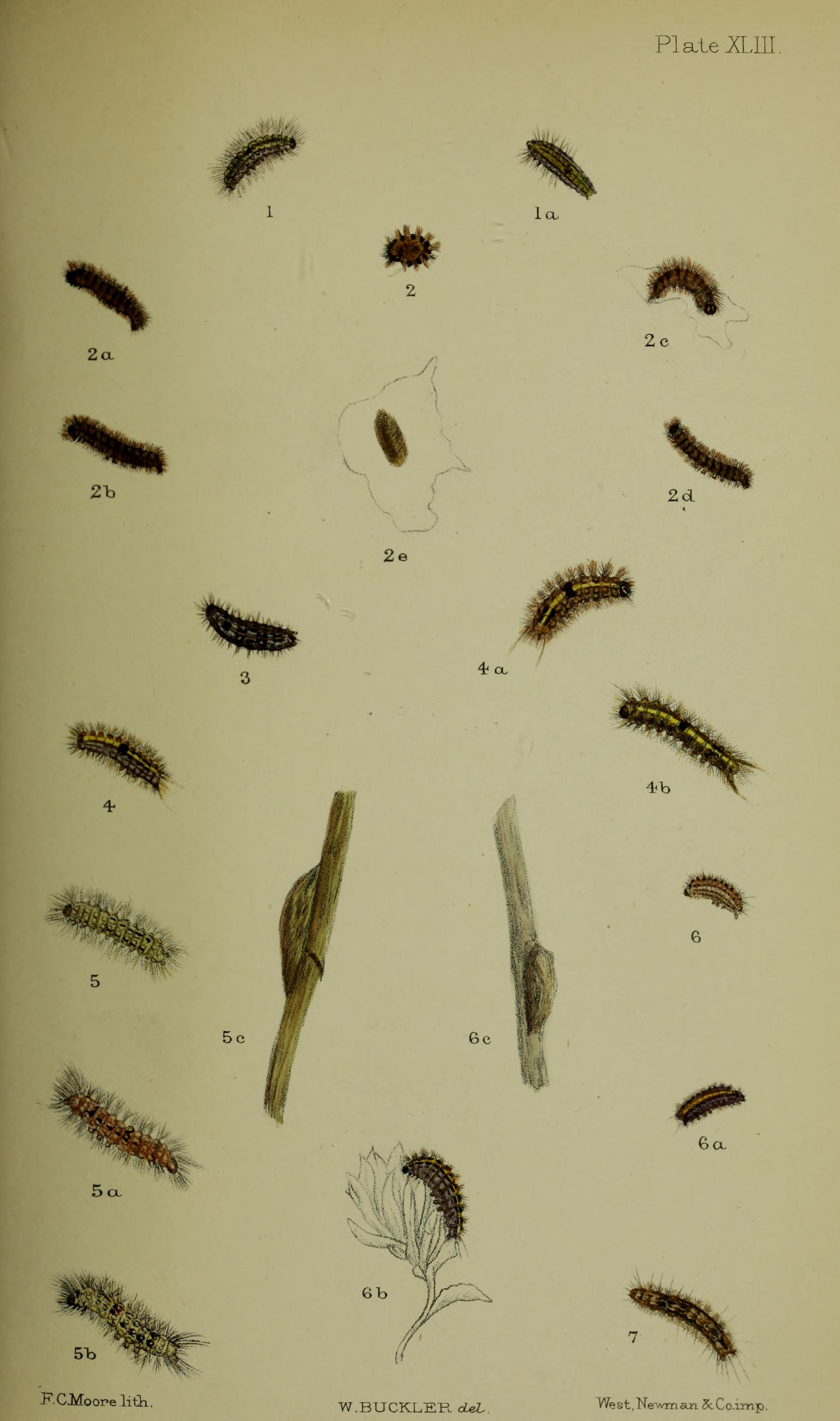
4, 4a, 4b larvae after last moult

The larvae feed on Quercus (including Quercus robur), Fagus, Prunus and Tilia species.

Its habitat includes mature deciduous woodland, where the larvae are believed to feed on oak (Quercus).
