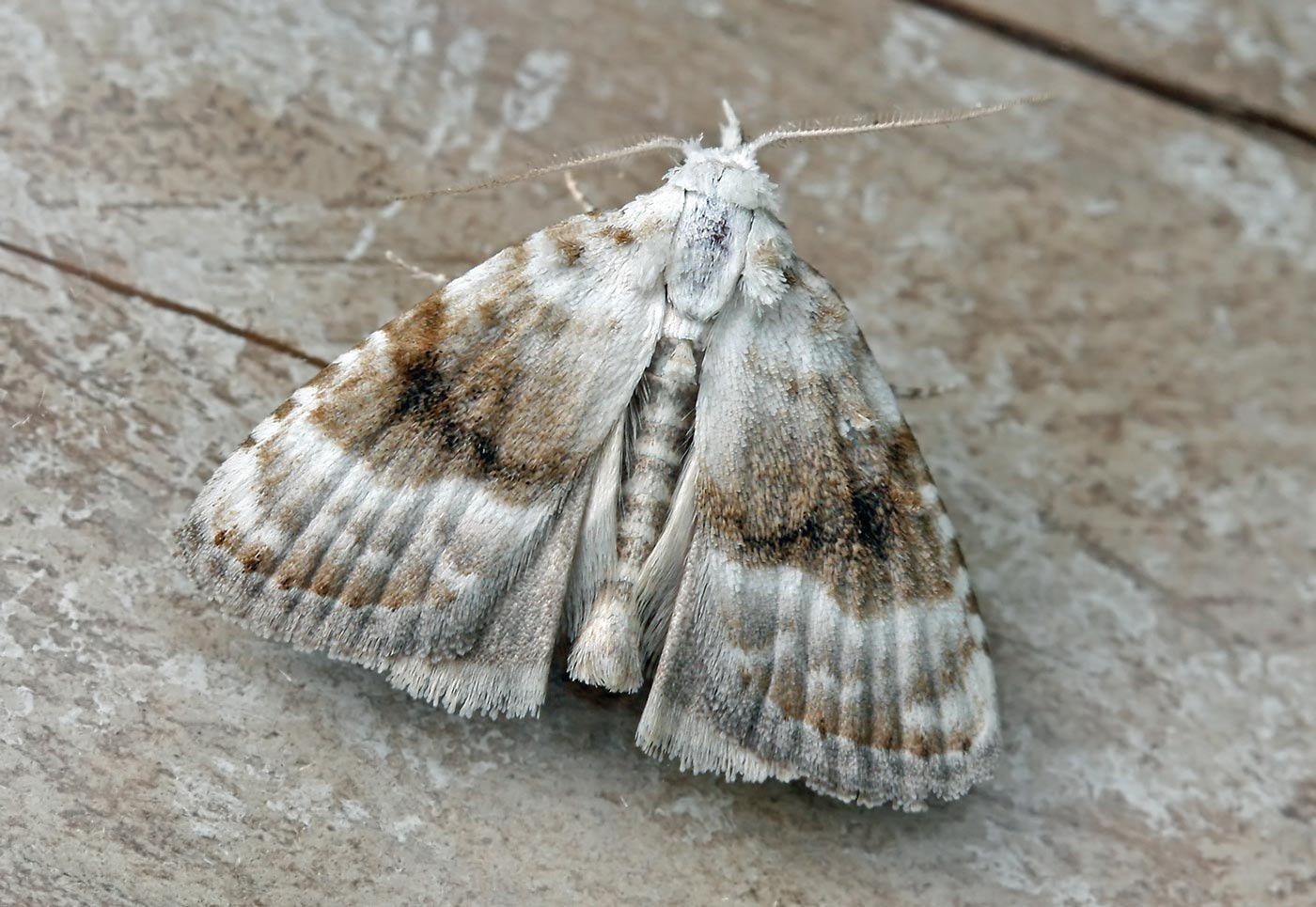

Scientific classification
- Domain: Eukaryota
- Kingdom: Animalia
- Phylum: Arthropoda
- Class: Insecta
- Order: Lepidoptera
- Superfamily: Noctuoidea
- Family: Nolidae
- Genus: Meganola
- Species: M. albula

Binomial name
- Meganola albula (Denis & Schiffermüller, 1775)

= Meganola albula =

Species of moth

Meganola albula, the Kent black arches, is a moth of the family Nolidae. The species was first described by Michael Denis and Ignaz Schiffermüller in 1775. It is found in the Palearctic realm (Europe, Asia Minor, Iran, Caucasus, Russian Far East, Japan).

== Description ==
The wingspan is 18–24 mm. The length of the forewings is 10–11 mm. The wings are short and wide, the forewings whitish or white-grey in ground colour. The midfield usually stands out distinctively dark brown, with a narrow middle band sometimes appearing even darker. The postdiscal region and the marginal area shimmer light brown. Ring, kidney and cone blemishes (orbicular, reniform (kidney shaped), and claviform discal marks) are absent or hardly recognizable. The hind wings are monochromatic white-grey and darkened at the edge. Male moths have combed antennae, while female moths have thread-like antennae. The palps are bright and conspicuously long.

== Biology ==
The moth flies in one generation from mid-June to August.

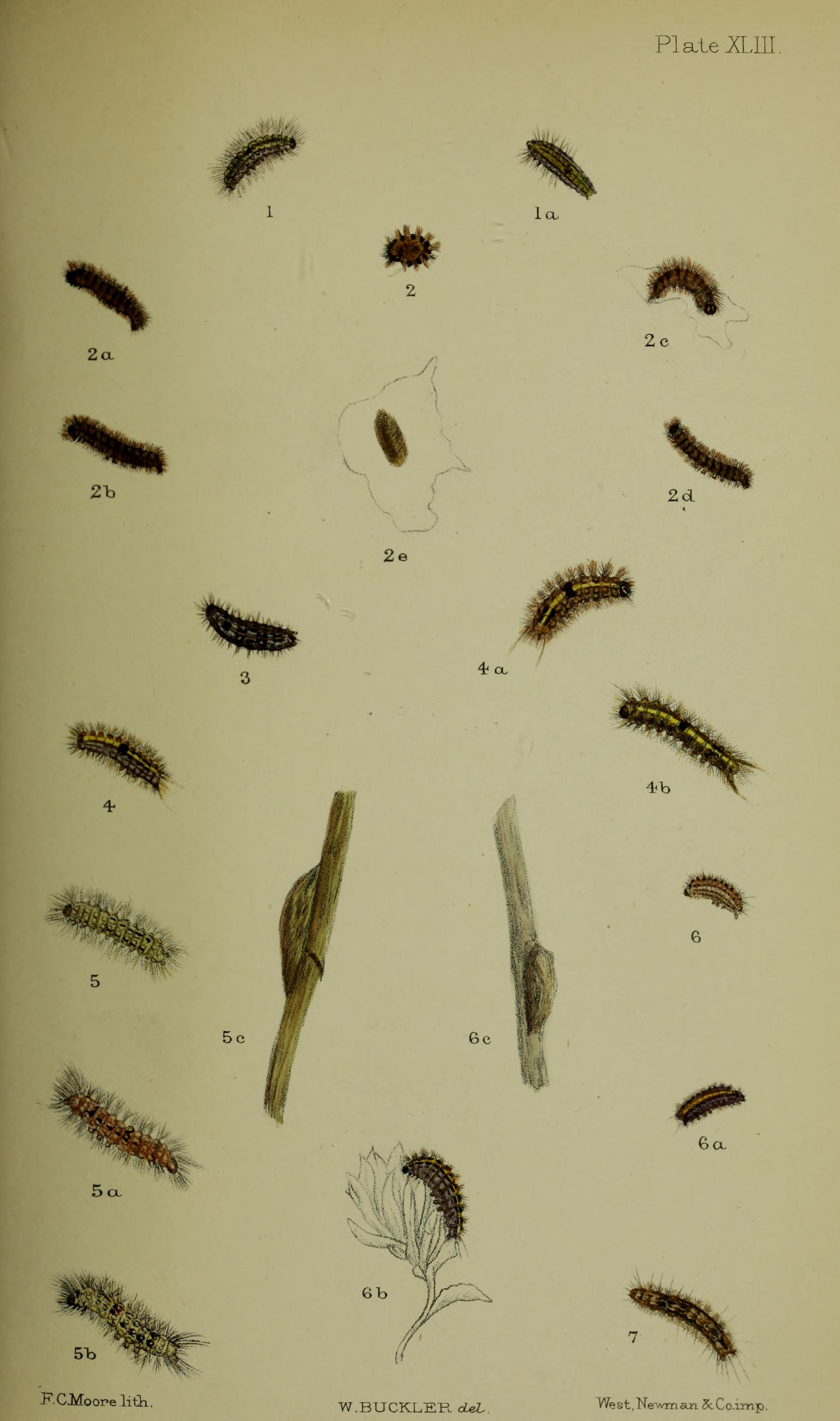
Fig. 5, 5a, 5b larvae after last moult 5c cocoon attached to a stem

The larvae feed on Rubus, Fragaria vesca and Vaccinium species.

Since the 19th-century, it has spread north being first recorded in England in 1859, Denmark 1938, Schleswig-Holstein 1945 and Gotland 1949

== Notes ==
1. The flight season refers to Belgium and the Netherlands. This may vary in other parts of the range.
