= Meganola fuscula =

Scientific classification
- Domain: Eukaryota
- Kingdom: Animalia
- Phylum: Arthropoda
- Class: Insecta
- Order: Lepidoptera
- Superfamily: Noctuoidea
- Family: Nolidae
- Genus: Meganola
- Species: M. fuscula

Binomial name
- Meganola fuscula (Grote, 1881)

Species of moth

Meganola fuscula is a species of nolid moth in the family Nolidae. It is found in North America.

The MONA or Hodges number for Meganola fuscula is 8985.
