= Baileya acadiana =

Scientific classification
- Domain: Eukaryota
- Kingdom: Animalia
- Phylum: Arthropoda
- Class: Insecta
- Order: Lepidoptera
- Superfamily: Noctuoidea
- Family: Nolidae
- Genus: Baileya
- Species: B. acadiana

Binomial name
- Baileya acadiana Brou, 2004

Species of moth

Baileya acadiana is a moth of the family Nolidae. It is found in Alabama, Arkansas, Louisiana, Mississippi and Texas.

Adults are on wing in three generations in Louisiana, with the first brood peaking in the beginning of April and subsequent broods peaking at sixty-day intervals.
