= Meganola minor =

Scientific classification
- Kingdom: Animalia
- Phylum: Arthropoda
- Class: Insecta
- Order: Lepidoptera
- Superfamily: Noctuoidea
- Family: Nolidae
- Genus: Meganola
- Species: M. minor

Binomial name
- Meganola minor Dyar, 1899

Species of moth

Meganola minor is a species of nolid moth in the family Nolidae. It is found in North America.

The MONA or Hodges number for Meganola minor is 8984.
