= Nycteola indica =

Scientific classification
- Domain: Eukaryota
- Kingdom: Animalia
- Phylum: Arthropoda
- Class: Insecta
- Order: Lepidoptera
- Superfamily: Noctuoidea
- Family: Nolidae
- Genus: Nycteola
- Species: N. indica

Binomial name
- Nycteola indica (R. Felder, 1874)

Synonyms
- Sarrothripa indica Felder, 1874; Selepa grisea Hampson, 1891; Clettharra pallescens Hampson, 1893; Giaura strigivenata Hampson, 1905; Sarrothripus indica ab. atrithorax Strand, 1917; Sarrothripus indica atrithorax Gaede, 1937

Species of moth

Nycteola indica is a moth of the family Nolidae first described by Rudolf Felder in 1874. It is found in Sri Lanka, India, Myanmar, Borneo, and Australia.

== Description ==
Forewings grey. Some specimen with a dark triangle in the costal center. A submarginal row of darker dots present. Posterior dots are large.
