= Nycteola svecicus =

Scientific classification
- Kingdom: Animalia
- Phylum: Arthropoda
- Class: Insecta
- Order: Lepidoptera
- Superfamily: Noctuoidea
- Family: Nolidae
- Genus: Nycteola
- Species: N. svecicus

Binomial name
- Nycteola svecicus (Bryk, 1941)

Species of moth

Nycteola svecicus is a moth belonging to the family Nolidae. The species was first described by Felix Bryk in 1941.

It is native to Northern Europe.
