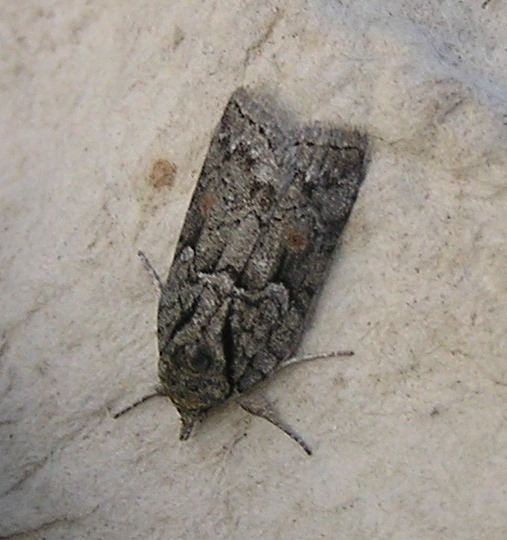
- Nycteola degenerana

Scientific classification
- Kingdom: Animalia
- Phylum: Arthropoda
- Clade: Pancrustacea
- Class: Insecta
- Order: Lepidoptera
- Superfamily: Noctuoidea
- Family: Nolidae
- Tribe: Sarrothripini
- Genus: Nycteola; Hübner, 1822

Species
- See text

Synonyms
- Dufayella

= Nycteola =

Genus of moths

Nycteola is a genus of moths of the family Nolidae.

== Species ==
- Nycteola aroa (Bethune-Baker, 1906)
- Nycteola asiatica (Krulikovsky, 1904)
- Nycteola avola (Bethune-Baker, 1906)
- Nycteola baeopis (Turner, 1906)
- Nycteola brunneicosta (Bethune-Baker, 1906)
- Nycteola cana (Hampson, 1912)
- Nycteola canaphaea Holloway, 2003
- Nycteola canoides Holloway, 1979
- Nycteola cinereana Neumoegen & Dyar, 1893
- Nycteola columbana (Turner, 1925)
- Nycteola columbiana (H. Edwards, 1873)
- Nycteola coreana (Leech, 1900)
- Nycteola costalis Sugi, 1959
- Nycteola degenerana (Hübner, [1799])
- Nycteola dufayi Sugi, 1982
- Nycteola eremostola Dufay, 1961
- Nycteola exophila (Meyrick, 1888)
- Nycteola fasciosa (Moore, 1888)
- Nycteola fletcheri Rindge, 1961
- Nycteola frigidana (Walker, 1863)
- Nycteola gandzhana Obraztsov, 1953
- Nycteola glaucus (Wileman & West, 1929)
- Nycteola indica (Felder, 1874)
- Nycteola indicatana (Walker, 1863)
- Nycteola indicatella (Berio, 1957)
- Nycteola kebea (Bethune-Baker, 1906)
- Nycteola kuldzhana Obraztsov, 1953
- Nycteola malachitis (Hampson, 1912)
- Nycteola mangifera (Tams, 1938)
- Nycteola mauritia (de Joannis, 1906)
- Nycteola mesoplaga (Hampson, 1905)
- Nycteola metaspilella (Walker, 1866) (syn: Nycteola scriptana (Walker, 1863))
- Nycteola minutum (Turner, 1902)
- Nycteola nolalella (Walker, 1866)
- Nycteola oblongata (Mell, 1943)
- Nycteola poliophaea (Hampson, 1907)
- Nycteola polycyma (Turner, 1899)
- Nycteola pseudoindica Holloway, 2003
- Nycteola pseudonilotica Holloway, 1979
- Nycteola revayana (Scopoli, 1772)
- Nycteola siculana (Fuchs, 1899)
- Nycteola sinuosa (Moore, 1888)
- Nycteola svecicus (Bryk, 1941)
- Nycteola symmicta (Turner, 1902)
- Nycteola triangularis Gaede, 1937
- Nycteola underwoodi (Druce, 1901)
- Nycteola virescens (Hampson, 1902)
