= Meganola dentata =

Scientific classification
- Domain: Eukaryota
- Kingdom: Animalia
- Phylum: Arthropoda
- Class: Insecta
- Order: Lepidoptera
- Superfamily: Noctuoidea
- Family: Nolidae
- Genus: Meganola
- Species: M. dentata

Binomial name
- Meganola dentata Dyar, 1899

Species of moth

Meganola dentata (the toothed meganola moth) is a species of nolid moth in the family Nolidae, found in North America.

The MONA or Hodges number for Meganola dentata is 8986.
