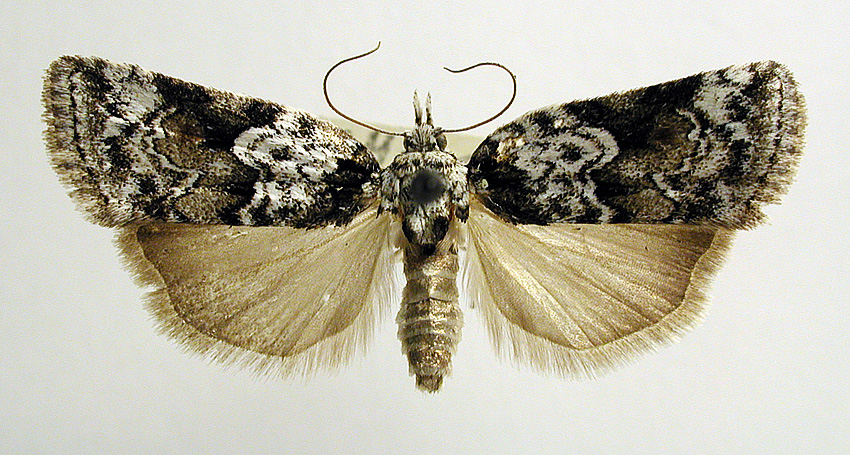

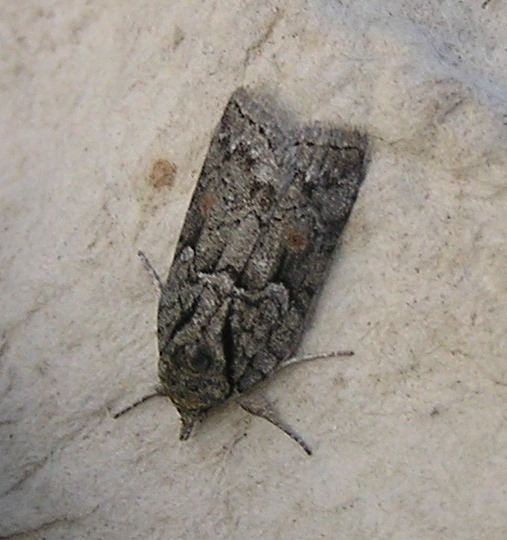

Scientific classification
- Domain: Eukaryota
- Kingdom: Animalia
- Phylum: Arthropoda
- Class: Insecta
- Order: Lepidoptera
- Superfamily: Noctuoidea
- Family: Nolidae
- Genus: Nycteola
- Species: N. degenerana

Binomial name
- Nycteola degenerana (Hübner, 1799)

Synonyms
- Tortrix degenerana Hübner, 1799; Nycteola degenerana hesperica Dufay [1799]; Nyeteola degenerana eurasiatica Dufay, [1799]

= Nycteola degenerana =

Species of moth

Nycteola degenerana, the sallow nycteoline, is a moth of the family Nolidae. The species was first described by Jacob Hübner in 1799. It is found in Europe, from southern Fennoscandia to Spain, Italy and the Balkans. Outside of Europe it is found in China, Japan, the Korean Peninsula, the Russian Far East (Primorye, southern Khabarovsk and the southern Amur region), southern Siberia (Transbaikalia, the Baikal area, Altai and western Siberia), Turkey and the Ural.

The wingspan is 23–28 mm. It is the largest species of the genus.

Adults are on wing from mid-June to the beginning of July and from the end of July (after overwintering) to May. There are two generations per year.

The larvae feed on Salix (including S. caprea, S. aurita, S. cinerea, S. myrsinifolia and S. phylicifolia) and Quercus robur.
