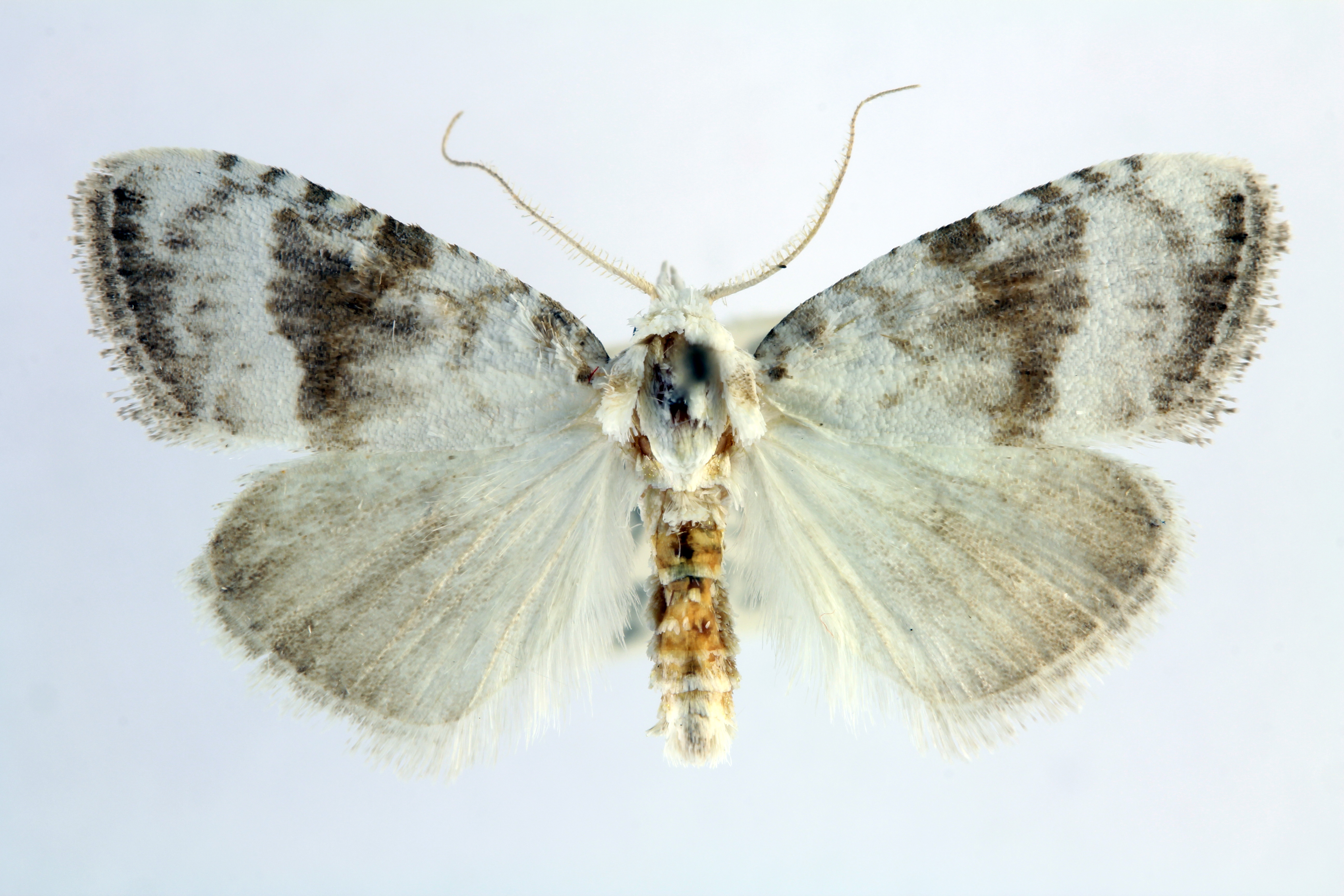
- Meganola albula

Scientific classification
- Kingdom: Animalia
- Phylum: Arthropoda
- Clade: Pancrustacea
- Class: Insecta
- Order: Lepidoptera
- Superfamily: Noctuoidea
- Family: Nolidae
- Subfamily: Nolinae
- Genus: Meganola; Dyar, 1898

= Meganola =

Genus of moths

Meganola is a genus of moths of the family Nolidae. The genus was erected by Harrison Gray Dyar Jr. in 1898. It is sometimes considered a synonym of Roeselia.

== Species ==
- Meganola albula (Denis & Schiffermüller, 1775)
- Meganola alteroscota Toulgoët, 1982
- Meganola apiensis Holloway, 2003
- Meganola arcanalis (Toulgoët, 1961)
- Meganola argentescens (Hampson, 1895)
- Meganola argyraspis (Draudt, 1918)
- Meganola argyria (Hampson, 1894)
- Meganola ascripta (Hampson, 1894)
- Meganola atypica (Dyar, 1914)
- Meganola basalactifera Holloway, 2003
- Meganola basifascia (Inoue, 1958)
- Meganola basifusca (Bethune-Baker, 1904)
- Meganola biangulata (Toulgoët, 1954)
- Meganola biconigera (Draudt, 1918)
- Meganola bifiliferata (Walker, [1863])
- Meganola bifuscalis Toulgoët, 1982
- Meganola bilineata (Reich, 1936)
- Meganola bilineatalis (Toulgoët, 1961)
- Meganola bryophilalis (Staudinger, 1887)
- Meganola bryophiloides (Butler, 1882)
- Meganola canescens (Draudt, 1918)
- Meganola caruscula (Dyar, 1922)
- Meganola castigata (Dognin, 1923)
- Meganola causta (Hampson, 1900)
- Meganola conspicua Dyar, 1898
- Meganola convexalis (Toulgoët, 1961)
- Meganola costalis (Staudinger, 1887)
- Meganola costiplagiata (Hampson, 1918)
- Meganola costisquamosa (Toulgoët, 1954)
- Meganola cramboidalis Toulgoët, 1982
- Meganola cretacea (Hampson, 1914)
- Meganola cuneifera (Walker, 1862)
- Meganola decaryi (Toulgoët, 1955)
- Meganola decepta (Schaus, 1911)
- Meganola deglupta (Draudt, 1918)
- Meganola dentata Dyar, 1899
- Meganola denticulata (Moore, 1888)
- Meganola dilutalis (Toulgoët, 1961)
- Meganola discisignata (Hampson, 1896)
- Meganola divisoides (Schaus, 1905)
- Meganola dognini (Rothschild, 1916)
- Meganola effusa (Draudt, 1918)
- Meganola emissa (Dyar, 1915)
- Meganola erythrinalis (Toulgoët, 1961)
- Meganola excelsior (Draudt, 1918)
- Meganola flavibasis (Hampson, 1900)
- Meganola flaviscapula (Draudt, 1918)
- Meganola flexilineata (Wileman, 1916)
- Meganola fumosa (Butler, 1879)
- Meganola funebralis (Toulgoët, 1961)
- Meganola fuscula (Grote, 1881)
- Meganola gallicola (Wiltshire, 1949)
- Meganola gibeauxi Toulgoët, 1982
- Meganola gigantoides (Inoue, 1961)
- Meganola gigantula (Staudinger, 1879)
- Meganola gigas (Butler, 1884)
- Meganola godalma (Draudt, 1918)
- Meganola grisea (Reuch, 1933)
- Meganola hemizona (Hampson, 1911)
- Meganola heteromorpha Hacker, 2012
- Meganola heteroscota (Toulgoët, 1954)
- Meganola hypopecta (Dyar, 1914)
- Meganola hypenoides (Talbot, 1929)
- Meganola incana (Saalmüller, 1884)
- Meganola incertalis Toulgoët, 1982
- Meganola indistincta (Hampson, 1894)
- Meganola inexpectalis (Toulgoët, 1961)
- Meganola infumatalis Toulgoët, 1982
- Meganola infuscata (Hampson, 1903)
- Meganola infuscatalis (Toulgoët, 1961)
- Meganola inga (Schaus, 1921)
- Meganola insolitalis Toulgoët, 1982
- Meganola integralis Toulgoët, 1982
- Meganola leucogramma (Dognin, 1912)
- Meganola leucomelas (Toulgoët, 1954)
- Meganola leucostola (Hampson, 1900)
- Meganola longiventris (Poujade, 1886)
- Meganola lucia (Son, 1933)
- Meganola maculata (Staudinger, 1887)
- Meganola manoboides Holloway, 2003
- Meganola manula (Wiltshire, 1961)
- Meganola marojejy Toulgoët, 1982
- Meganola medialis (Toulgoët, 1961)
- Meganola mediofascia (Inoue, 1958)
- Meganola mediofracta (Toulgoët, 1954)
- Meganola mediolinealis (Toulgoët, 1961)
- Meganola medioscripta (Schaus, 1899)
- Meganola mediozona (Dognin, 1899)
- Meganola melanosticta (Hampson, 1914)
- Meganola melletes (Dyar, 1914)
- Meganola mesotherma (Hampson, 1914)
- Meganola metaleuca (Hampson, 1900)
- Meganola micans (Hampson, 1900)
- Meganola micropecta (Dyar, 1914)
- Meganola mikabo (Inoue, 1970)
- Meganola millotalis (Toulgoët, 1965)
- Meganola minor Dyar, 1899
- Meganola minuscula (Zeller, 1872)
- Meganola modestalis (Toulgoët, 1961)
- Meganola monticola (Roepke, 1948)
- Meganola nanula (Toulgoët, 1954)
- Meganola nepheloleuca (Hampson, 1914)
- Meganola nigrobasalis (Rothschild, 1916)
- Meganola nigromixtalis (Toulgoët, 1961)
- Meganola nitida (Hampson, 1894)
- Meganola nitidoides Holloway, 2003
- Meganola niveicosta (Schaus, 1905)
- Meganola nivitalis (Toulgoët, 1965)
- Meganola nudalis (Toulgoët, 1961)
- Meganola oblita (Wileman & West, 1929)
- Meganola pallidiceps (Hampson, 1907)
- Meganola palpalis (Toulgoët, 1961)
- Meganola paulianalis (Toulgoët, 1961)
- Meganola pecta (Dyar, 1914)
- Meganola perangulata (Hampson, 1900)
- Meganola pernitens (Schaus, 1911)
- Meganola phylla (Dyar, 1898)
- Meganola pictalis Toulgoët, 1982
- Meganola placens (Schaus, 1911)
- Meganola plumatella (Druce, 1885)
- Meganola polydonta (Schaus, 1905)
- Meganola protigagas (Inoue, 1970)
- Meganola pseudermana (Dyar, 1918)
- Meganola pseudomajor (Toulgoët, 1965)
- Meganola pulverata (Wileman & West, 1929)
- Meganola pulverea (Dognin, 1912)
- Meganola punctilinea (Draudt, 1918)
- Meganola pygmaea (Hampson, 1900)
- Meganola pyralidoides (Reich, 1933)
- Meganola recurvata (Dognin, 1914)
- Meganola rubiginealis (Toulgoët, 1961)
- Meganola rufescens (Dognin, 1899)
- Meganola rufomixtalis (Toulgoët, 1961)
- Meganola saalmuelleri (Toulgoët, 1961)
- Meganola sabulosa (Schaus, 1911)
- Meganola satoi (Inoue, 1970)
- Meganola scripta (Moore, 1888)
- Meganola scriptoides Holloway, 2003
- Meganola scriptrix (Eecke, 1926)
- Meganola semicrema (Draudt, 1918)
- Meganola semirufa (Hampson, 1894)
- Meganola shimekii (Inoue, 1970)
- Meganola sogalis (Toulgoët, 1965)
- Meganola spodia Franclemont, 1985
- Meganola stictigramma (Dognin, 1912)
- Meganola stigmatica (Reich, 1936)
- Meganola stilbina (Draudt, 1918)
- Meganola strigivena (Hampson, 1894)
- Meganola strigula (Denis & Schiffermüller, 1775)
- Meganola subalbalis (Zeller, 1852)
- Meganola subgigas Inoue, 1982
- Meganola taurica (Daniel, 1935)
- Meganola tessellalis Toulgoët, 1982
- Meganola togatulalis (Hübner, 1796)
- Meganola triangulalis (Leech, 1888)
- Meganola trianguloquelinea (Eecke, 1920)
- Meganola trias (Schaus, 1921)
- Meganola unilinea (Schaus, 1911)
- Meganola varia (Barnes & Lindsey, 1921)
- Meganola venosalis (Toulgoët, 1954)
- Meganola venusta (Brandt, 1938)
- Meganola venustula (Toulgoët, 1954)
- Meganola versicolora (Dognin, 1907)
- Meganola viettealis Toulgoët, 1982
- Meganola vieui (Toulgoët, 1961)
