= Meganola hypenoides =

Scientific classification
- Domain: Eukaryota
- Kingdom: Animalia
- Phylum: Arthropoda
- Class: Insecta
- Order: Lepidoptera
- Superfamily: Noctuoidea
- Family: Nolidae
- Genus: Meganola
- Species: M. hypenoides

Binomial name
- Meganola hypenoides (Talbot, 1929)

Synonyms
- Nola hypenoides Talbot, 1929

Species of moth

Meganola hypenoides is a species of moth of the family Nolidae. It occurs on São Tomé Island, an island off the western equatorial coast of Central Africa. The species was described by George Talbot in 1929 as Nola hypenoides based on specimens collected in 1925 by T.A. Barns. In 2012, it was placed in the genus Meganola.

== Description ==
The moth has dark brown, almost caramel-colored forewings, which have wavy lines on the edge of the wing and spots on the inner section, and khaki-colored hindwings, which have darker-colored lines running the long way across them. The forewings are definitely larger than the bottom wings, and both the top and bottom wings are somewhat pear shaped. The species also has two antennas.
