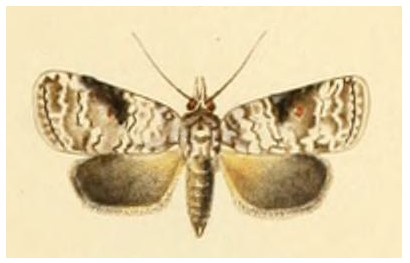

Scientific classification
- Domain: Eukaryota
- Kingdom: Animalia
- Phylum: Arthropoda
- Class: Insecta
- Order: Lepidoptera
- Superfamily: Noctuoidea
- Family: Nolidae
- Genus: Nycteola
- Species: N. mauritia

Binomial name
- Nycteola mauritia (de Joannis, 1906)

Synonyms
- Sarrothripa mauritia de Joannis, 1906

= Nycteola mauritia =

Species of moth

Nycteola mauritia is a species of moth in the family Nolidae. It occurs only on some islands in the Indian Ocean, as Madagascar, Seychelles (Mahé, Praslin), Mauritius and Réunion.

Their larvae feed on Myrtaceae species, like Syzygium cumini., guava (Psidium pomiferum) and Eucalyptus robusta.
