= Nycteola poliophaea =

Scientific classification
- Kingdom: Animalia
- Phylum: Arthropoda
- Class: Insecta
- Order: Lepidoptera
- Superfamily: Noctuoidea
- Family: Nolidae
- Genus: Nycteola
- Species: N. poliophaea

Binomial name
- Nycteola poliophaea (Hampson, 1907)

Species of moth

Nycteola poliophaea is a moth of the family Nolidae first described by George Hampson in 1907. It is found in Sri Lanka and India.

== Description ==
Its forewings are pale gray with zigzag, antemedial and postmedial fasciae. There is a dark tooth visible from the sub-basal which extends to the antemedial. Its larval food plant is Eugenia.
