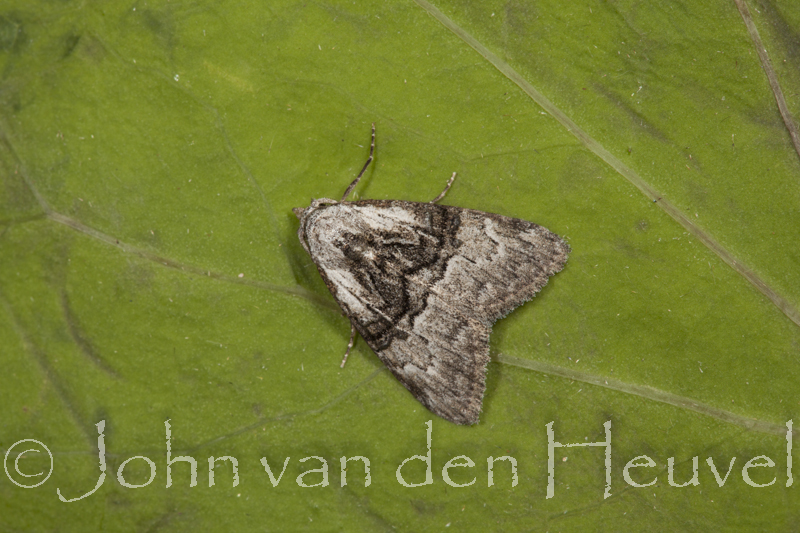
- Meganola togatulalis

Scientific classification
- Kingdom: Animalia
- Phylum: Arthropoda
- Class: Insecta
- Order: Lepidoptera
- Superfamily: Noctuoidea
- Family: Nolidae
- Genus: Meganola
- Species: M. togatulalis

Binomial name
- Meganola togatulalis Hubner, 1796

= Meganola togatulalis =

Species of moth

Meganola togatulalis is a species of moth belonging to the family Nolidae.

It is native to Europe.
