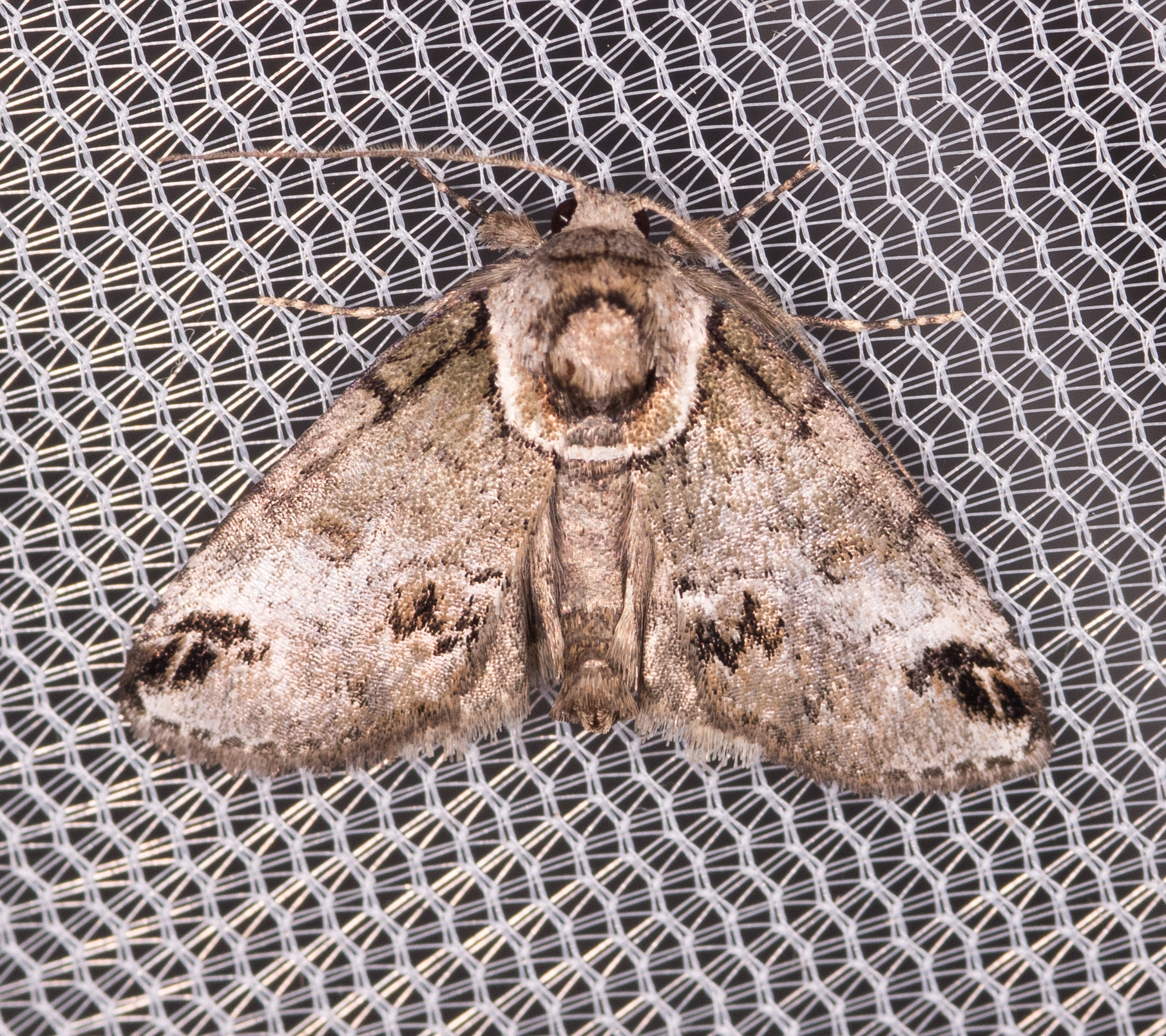

Scientific classification
- Domain: Eukaryota
- Kingdom: Animalia
- Phylum: Arthropoda
- Class: Insecta
- Order: Lepidoptera
- Superfamily: Noctuoidea
- Family: Nolidae
- Genus: Baileya
- Species: B. australis

Binomial name
- Baileya australis (Grote, 1881)

Synonyms
- Leptina opththalmica var. australis Grote, 1881

= Baileya australis =

Species of moth

Baileya australis, the small baileya moth, is a moth of the family Nolidae. The species was first described by Augustus Radcliffe Grote in 1881. It is found in North America, where it has been recorded from Quebec and New York to Florida, west to Texas, north to North Dakota and Ontario.

The wingspan is 21–28 mm. Adults are on wing from April to September in up to three generations per year in the south.
