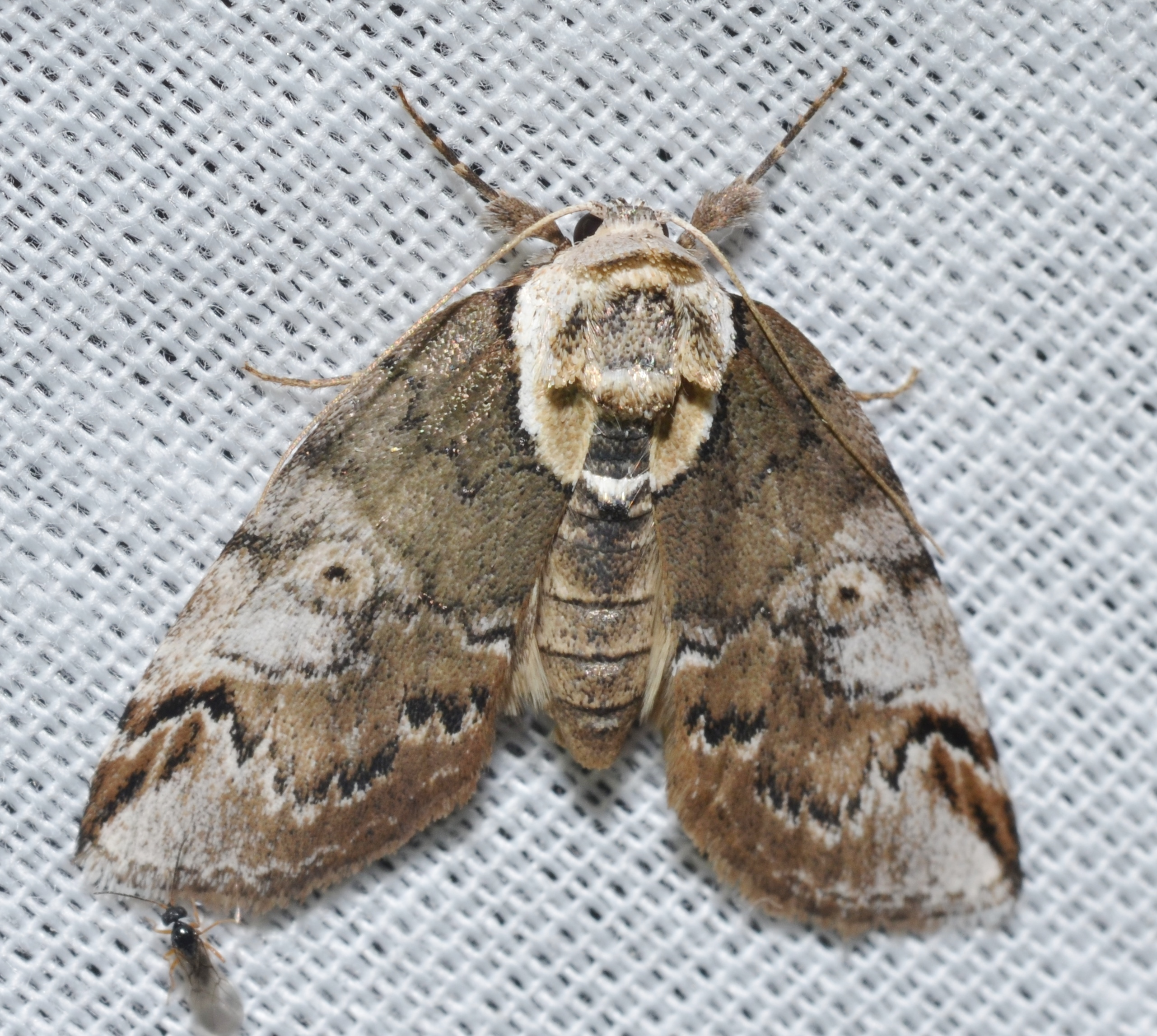

Scientific classification
- Kingdom: Animalia
- Phylum: Arthropoda
- Clade: Pancrustacea
- Class: Insecta
- Order: Lepidoptera
- Superfamily: Noctuoidea
- Family: Nolidae
- Genus: Baileya
- Species: B. ophthalmica

Binomial name
- Baileya ophthalmica (Guenée, 1852)

= Baileya ophthalmica =

Species of moth

Baileya ophthalmica, the eyed baileya, is a species of nolid moth (family Nolidae). The species was first described by Achille Guenée in 1852. It is found in North America.
