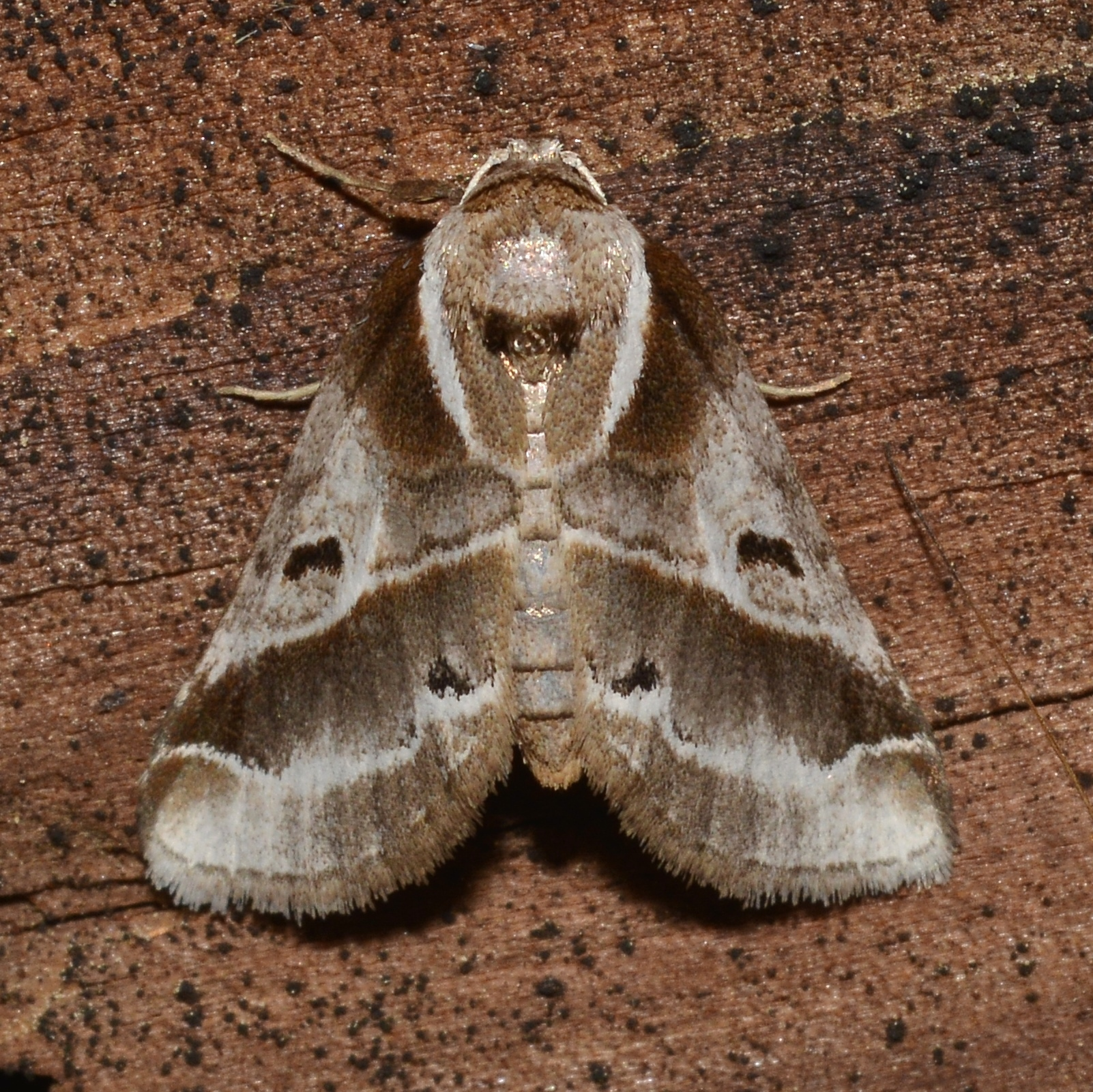

Scientific classification
- Kingdom: Animalia
- Phylum: Arthropoda
- Clade: Pancrustacea
- Class: Insecta
- Order: Lepidoptera
- Superfamily: Noctuoidea
- Family: Nolidae
- Genus: Baileya
- Species: B. doubledayi

Binomial name
- Baileya doubledayi (Guenee, 1852)

= Baileya doubledayi =

Species of moth

Baileya doubledayi, or Doubleday's baileya, is a nolid moth (family Nolidae). The species was first described by Achille Guenée in 1852. It is found in North America.
