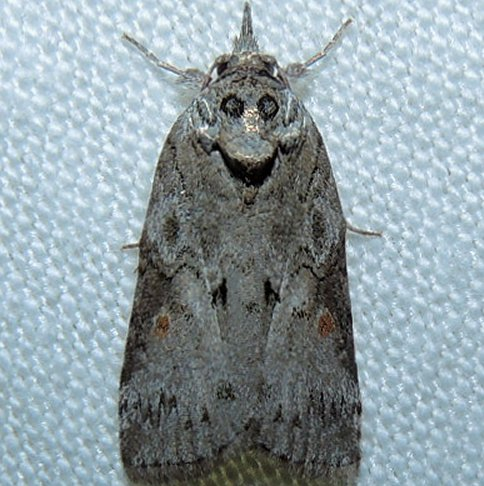

Scientific classification
- Kingdom: Animalia
- Phylum: Arthropoda
- Class: Insecta
- Order: Lepidoptera
- Superfamily: Noctuoidea
- Family: Nolidae
- Genus: Nycteola
- Species: N. metaspilella

Binomial name
- Nycteola metaspilella (Walker, 1866)

= Nycteola metaspilella =

Species of moth

Nycteola metaspilella, the forgotten frigid owlet, is a nolid moth (family Nolidae). The species was first described by Francis Walker in 1866. It is found in North America.

The MONA or Hodges number for Nycteola metaspilella is 8978.
