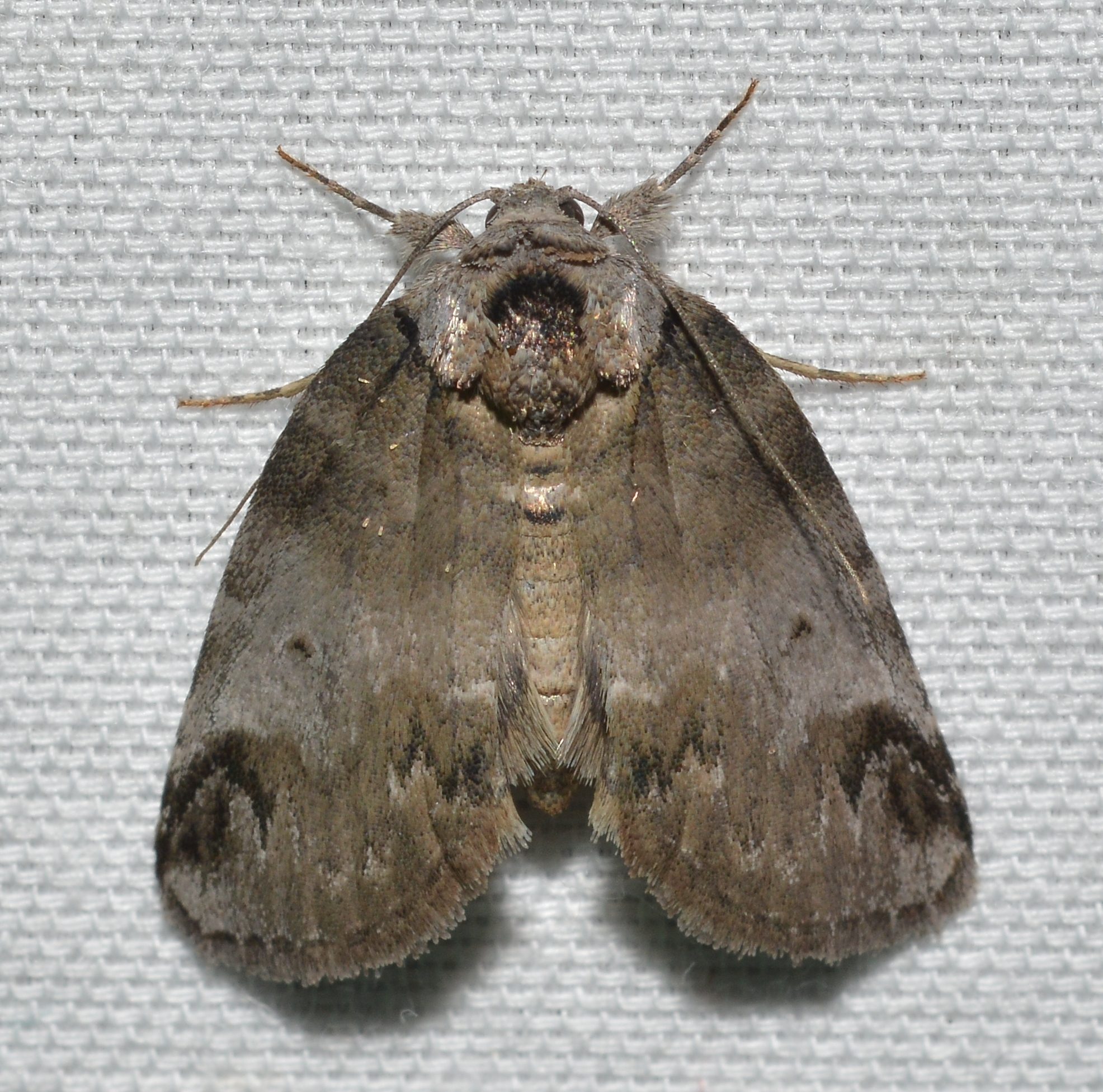

Scientific classification
- Kingdom: Animalia
- Phylum: Arthropoda
- Class: Insecta
- Order: Lepidoptera
- Superfamily: Noctuoidea
- Family: Nolidae
- Genus: Baileya
- Species: B. dormitans

Binomial name
- Baileya dormitans (Guenée, 1852)

= Baileya dormitans =

Species of moth

Baileya dormitans, the sleeping baileya, is a nolid moth (family Nolidae). The species was first described by Achille Guenée in 1852. It is found in North America.

The MONA or Hodges number for Baileya dormitans is 8971.
