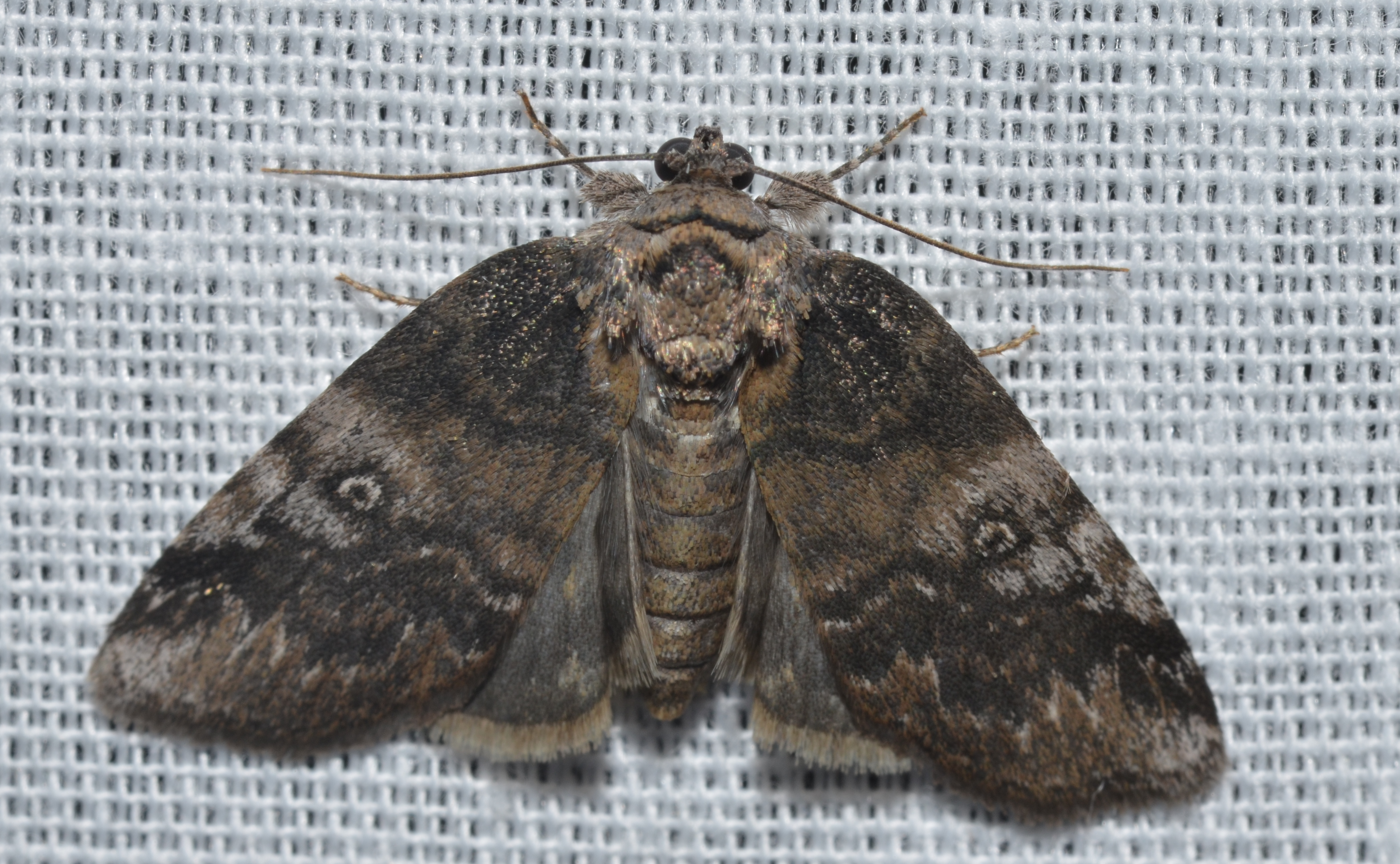

Scientific classification
- Kingdom: Animalia
- Phylum: Arthropoda
- Clade: Pancrustacea
- Class: Insecta
- Order: Lepidoptera
- Superfamily: Noctuoidea
- Family: Nolidae
- Genus: Baileya
- Species: B. levitans

Binomial name
- Baileya levitans (Smith, 1906)

= Baileya levitans =

Species of moth

Baileya levitans, the pale baileya, is a species of nolid moth in the family Nolidae. It was described by Smith in 1906 and is found in North America.

The MONA or Hodges number for Baileya levitans is 8972.
