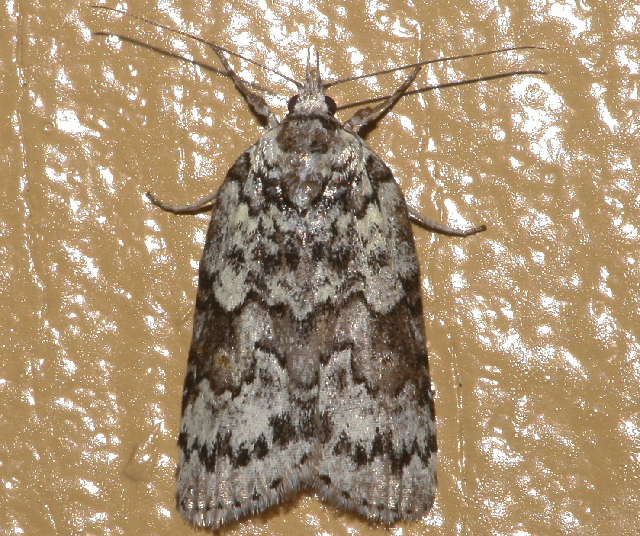

Scientific classification
- Domain: Eukaryota
- Kingdom: Animalia
- Phylum: Arthropoda
- Class: Insecta
- Order: Lepidoptera
- Superfamily: Noctuoidea
- Family: Nolidae
- Genus: Nycteola
- Species: N. columbiana

Binomial name
- Nycteola columbiana (H. Edwards, 1873)

= Nycteola columbiana =

Species of moth

Nycteola columbiana is a species of nolid moth in the family Nolidae. It is found in North America.

The MONA or Hodges number for Nycteola columbiana is 8976.
