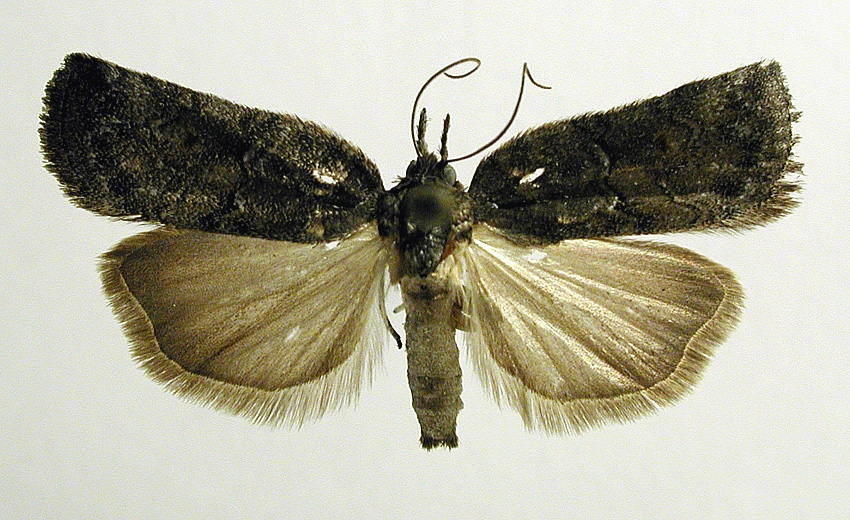

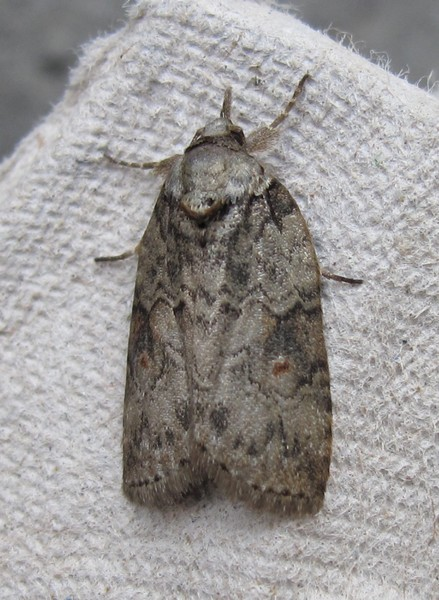

Scientific classification
- Domain: Eukaryota
- Kingdom: Animalia
- Phylum: Arthropoda
- Class: Insecta
- Order: Lepidoptera
- Superfamily: Noctuoidea
- Family: Nolidae
- Genus: Nycteola
- Species: N. revayana

Binomial name
- Nycteola revayana (Scopoli, 1772)

Synonyms
- Phalaena revayana Scopoli, 1772; Pyralis duplana Fabricius, 1777; Pyralis ilicana Fabricius, 1781; Phalaena lathamiana Swederus, 1787; Phalaena afzeliana Swederus, 1787; Pyralis riuagana Fabricius, 1787; Tortrix punctana Hübner, [1799]; Tortrix undulana Hübner, [1799] (preocc.); Tortrix ramosana Hübner, [1799]; Phalaena bifasciana Donovan, 1801; Sarrothripus stonius Curtis, 1829; Sarrothripa russiana Duponchel, [1845]; Subrita bilineatella Walker, 1866; Sarrothripa fusculana Schmid, 1886; Plotheia diplographa Hampson, 1905

= Nycteola revayana =

Species of moth

Nycteola revayana, the oak nycteoline, is a moth of the family Nolidae. The species was first described by Giovanni Antonio Scopoli in 1772. It is found from Europe and east across the Palearctic to Japan and India.

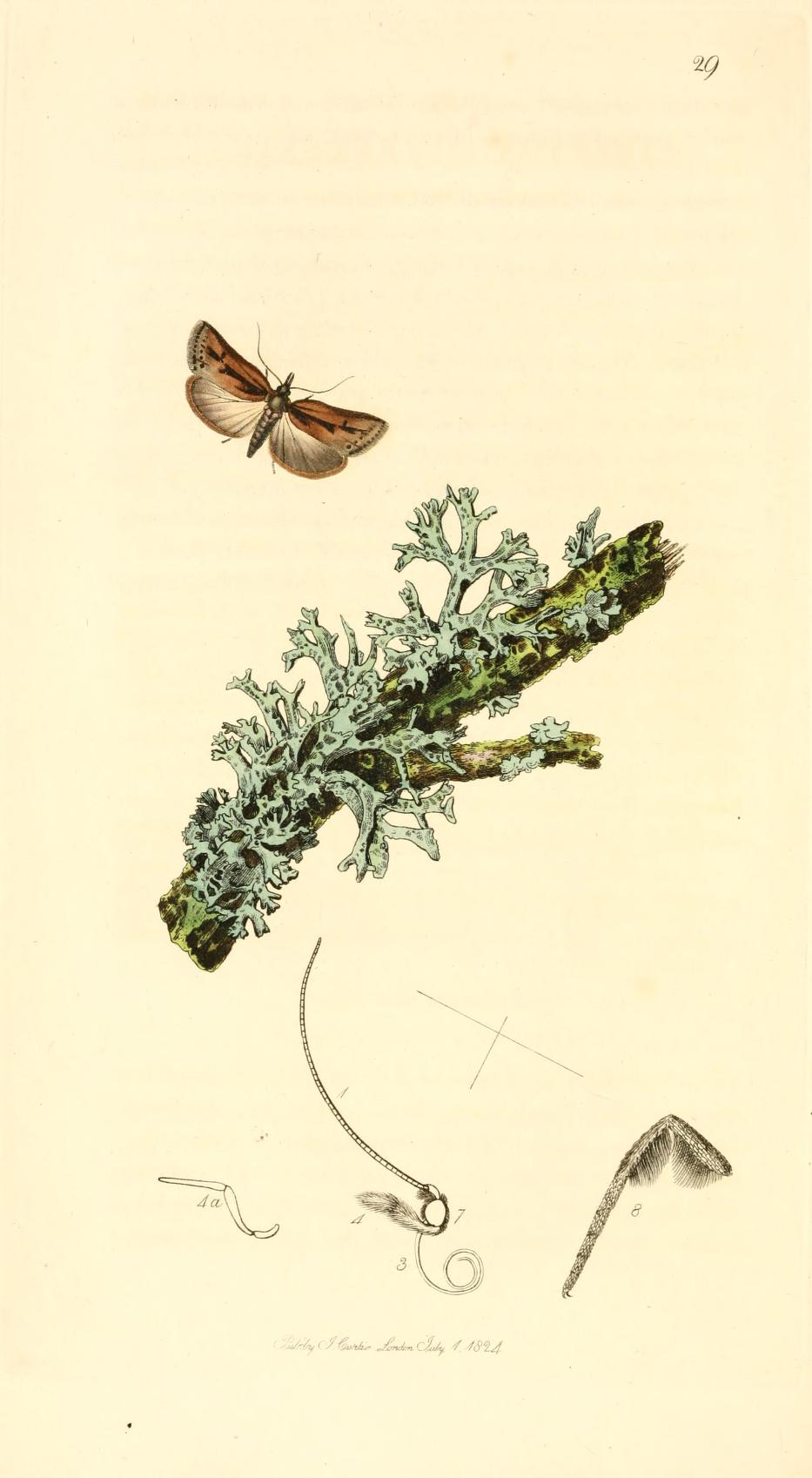
Illustration from John Curtis's British Entomology Volume 1

It is a small species and somewhat resembles the Tortricidae. It used to be thought to be related to that family, and was known as the large marbled tortrix.

== Technical description and variation ==
S. revayana Scop. Forewing ashy grey, dusted with darker, especially in costal half of median area; lines darker, double, but indistinct;the inner outcurved above and below middle, and angled outwards below vein 1; the outer irregularly waved and strongly indented on submedian fold; some faint dark spots indicate the submarginal line; hindwing pale greyish fuscous; — in the ab. fusculana Schmid the ground colour is dull dark brownish fuscous, with the black lines visible and a ferruginous spot representing the reniform stigma; from the middle of base an oblique black streak runs to lower end of the inner line; the submarginal spots are visible, and a row of small black marginal lunules; — ab. dilutana Hbn. has the ground colour dull grey or whitish grey, the median area brownish grey, more purely brown towards costa; the reniform diffuse, rufous; the pale basal area with grey spots between the veins between subbasal and inner lines; the submarginal spots darker grey and the pale submarginal line beyond them more clearly marked; — ab. degenerana Hbn. is bright greenish white; the median area purplish grey and brown, blacker towards costa, the reniform purple red; the lines filled up with white and the cloudy spots in basal and marginal areas black; a black spot at apex; fringe whitish; intermediate forms occur between this and dilutana; the ab. obscura ab. nov. has the whole forewing olive brown, the markings as in degenerana; — ab. glaucana Lampa has the forewing obscurely glaucescent, with a triangular dark fuscous blotch; — ab. ilicana F. (= punctana Hbn.) is pale fawn grey, sprinkled with whitish scales; the lines much finer; the cell spot, a spot on each side of the median vein before inner line, and the two lowest spots of the submarginal line black; — in ab. ramosana Hbn. (= ramulanus Curt.) the ground colour is brownish grey, with fuscous shading, and a deep black streak from below base of cell to below reniform stigma, shortly branched towards inner margin beyond subbasal and inner lines; the submarginal spots darker; — ab. russiana Dup. has the forewing grey green, with a large dark median blotch. Larva green with the segmental incisions yellowish, the tubercles with long white. The wingspan is 20–25 millimetres (0.79–0.98 in).

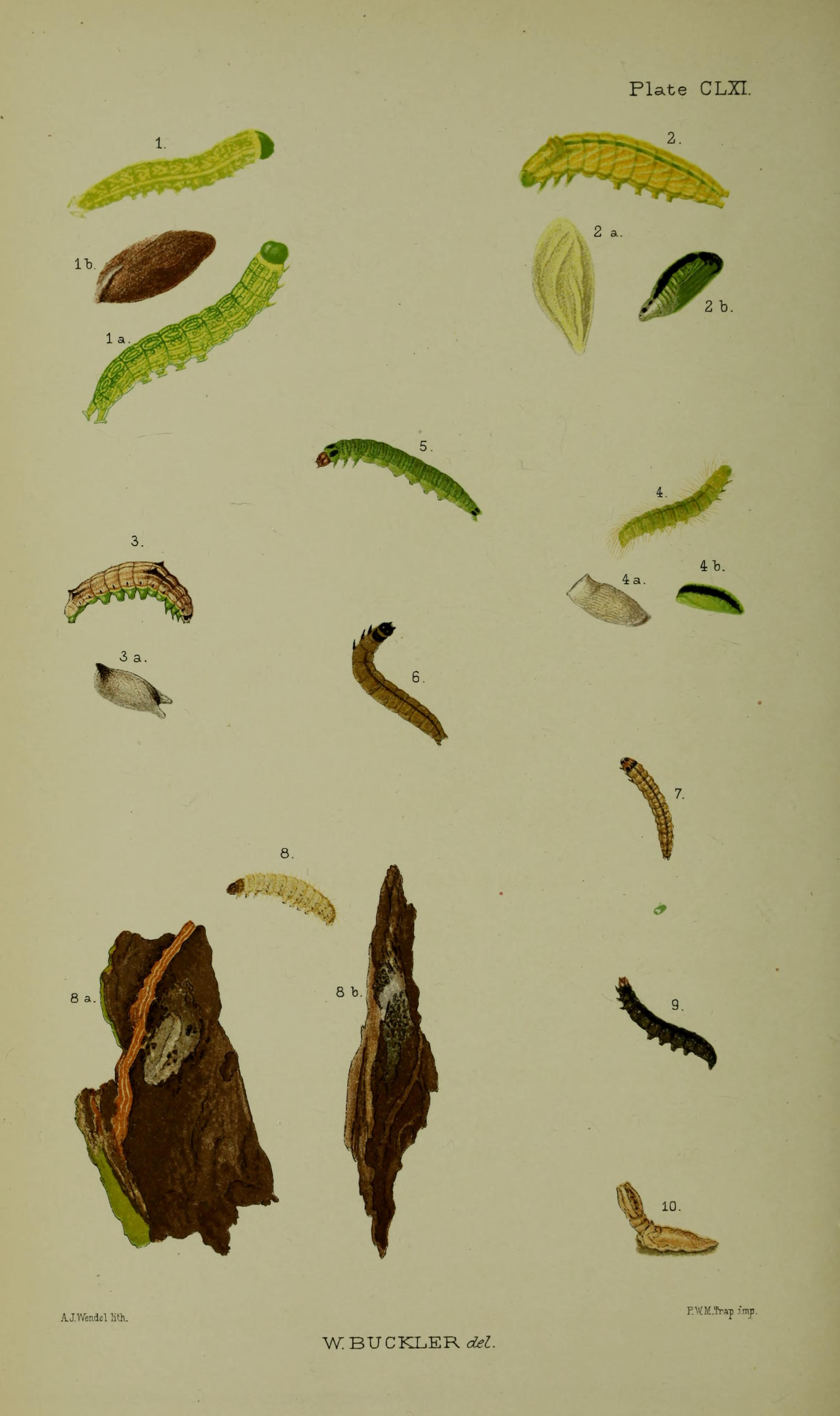
Figs. 4 larva after final moult, 4a cocoon, 4b pupa

== Biology ==
Adults are on wing adults in late autumn, overwintering and appearing again in early spring.

The larvae mainly feed on Quercus species, including Quercus robur, but have also been recorded on Populus and Salix species. They rest curled up between the leaves of their host, and pupate in yellow, boat-shaped cocoons.
