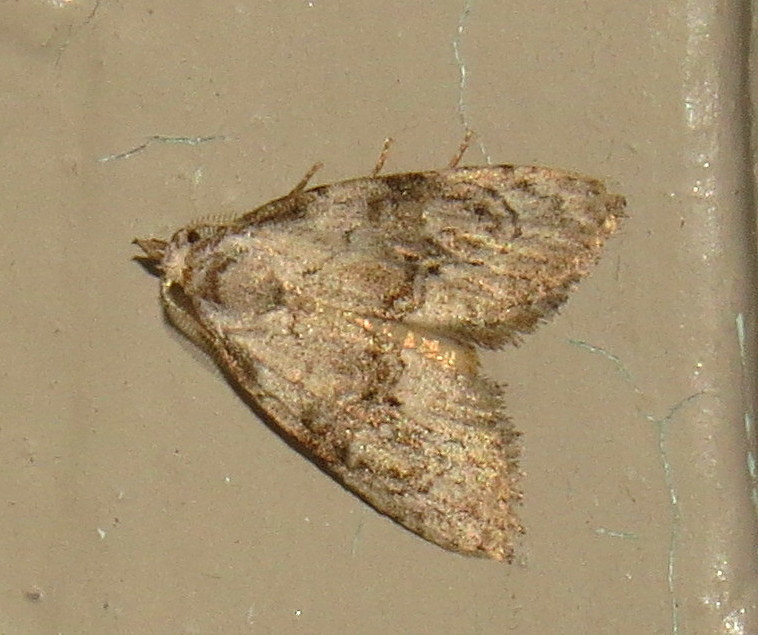

Scientific classification
- Domain: Eukaryota
- Kingdom: Animalia
- Phylum: Arthropoda
- Class: Insecta
- Order: Lepidoptera
- Superfamily: Noctuoidea
- Family: Nolidae
- Genus: Meganola
- Species: M. spodia

Binomial name
- Meganola spodia Franclemont, 1985

= Meganola spodia =

Species of moth

Meganola spodia, commonly known as the ashy meganola or Franclemont's meganola moth, is a species of nolid moth in the family Nolidae. It is found in North America.

The MONA or Hodges number for Meganola spodia is 8983.2.
