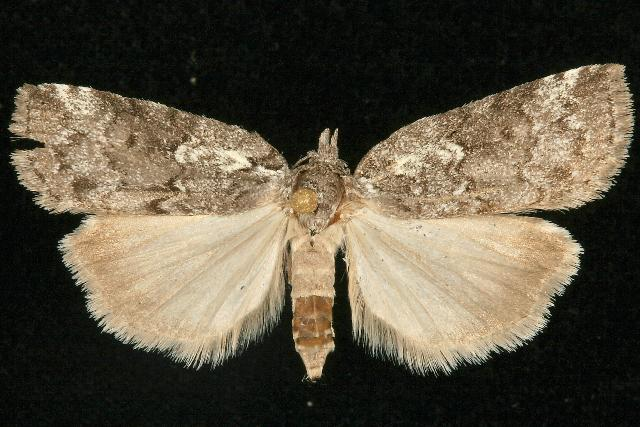

Scientific classification
- Kingdom: Animalia
- Phylum: Arthropoda
- Class: Insecta
- Order: Lepidoptera
- Superfamily: Noctuoidea
- Family: Nolidae
- Genus: Nycteola
- Species: N. frigidana

Binomial name
- Nycteola frigidana (Walker, 1863)

= Nycteola frigidana =

Species of moth

Nycteola frigidana, known generally as the frigid owlet or frigid midget, is a species of nolid moth in the family Nolidae. It is found in North America.

The MONA or Hodges number for Nycteola frigidana is 8975.
