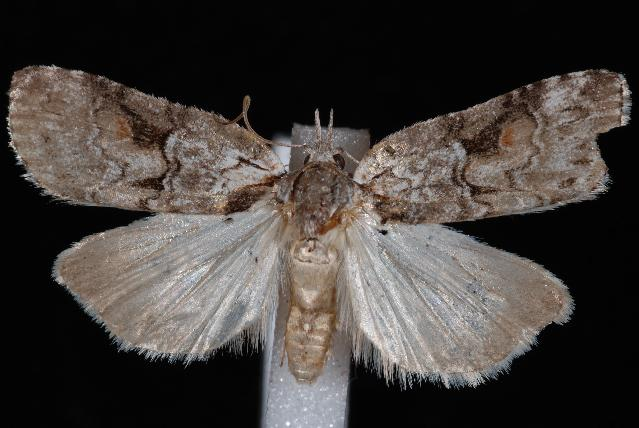

Scientific classification
- Kingdom: Animalia
- Phylum: Arthropoda
- Clade: Pancrustacea
- Class: Insecta
- Order: Lepidoptera
- Superfamily: Noctuoidea
- Family: Nolidae
- Genus: Nycteola
- Species: N. cinereana

Binomial name
- Nycteola cinereana Neumoegen & Dyar, 1893

= Nycteola cinereana =

Species of moth

Nycteola cinereana, the grey midget or ash-colored owlet moth, is a species of moth in the family Nolidae. It was first described by Berthold Neumoegen and Harrison Gray Dyar Jr. in 1893. It is found in North America.
