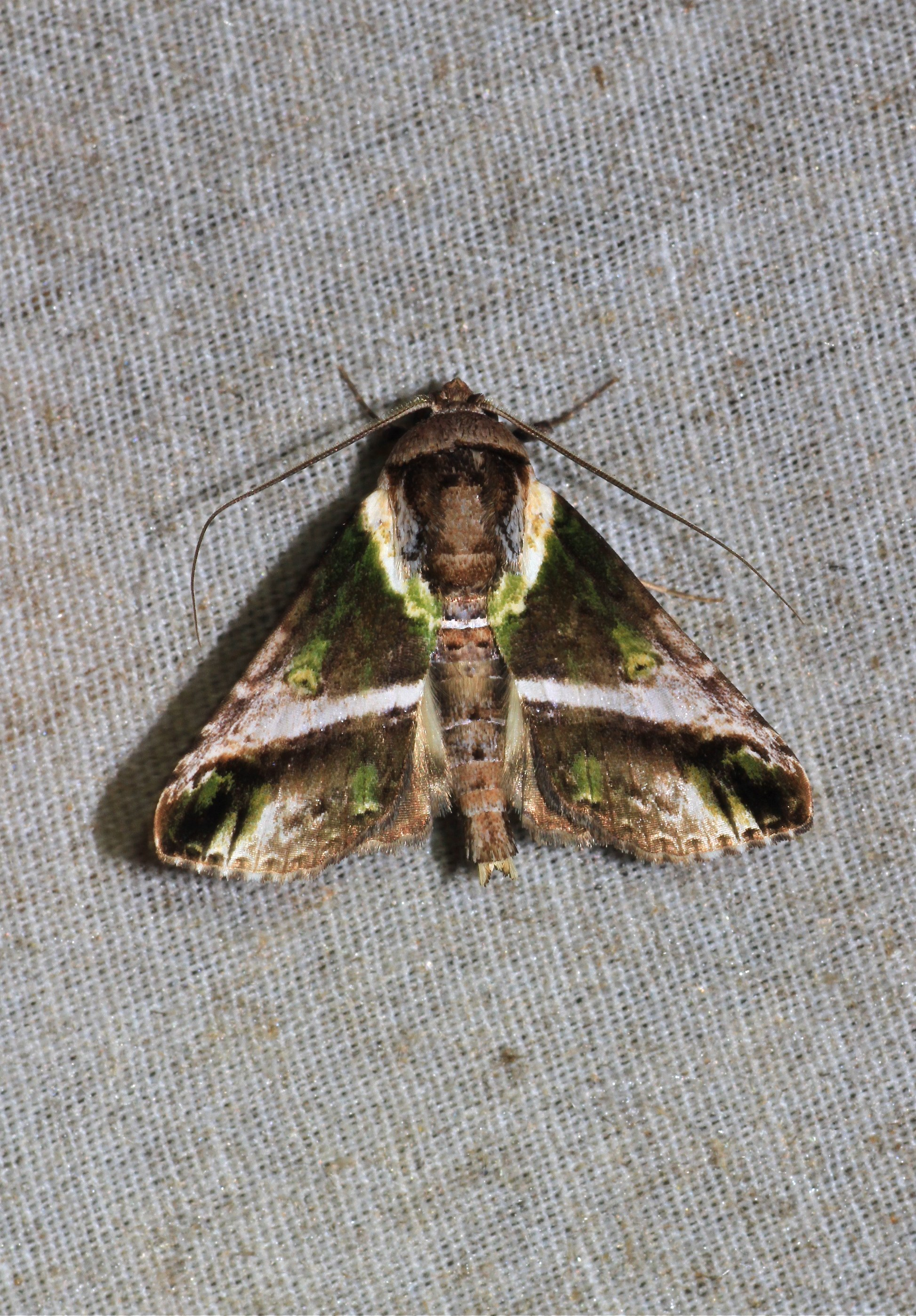
- Risoba obscurivialis

Scientific classification
- Kingdom: Animalia
- Phylum: Arthropoda
- Clade: Pancrustacea
- Class: Insecta
- Order: Lepidoptera
- Superfamily: Noctuoidea
- Family: Nolidae
- Subfamily: Risobinae; Mell, 1943

= Risobinae =

Subfamily of moths

Risobinae is a subfamily of the moth family Nolidae.

== Genera ==
- Baileya Grote, 1895
- Elaeognatha Hampson, 1905
- Gigantoceras Holland, 1893
- Risoba Moore, 1881
