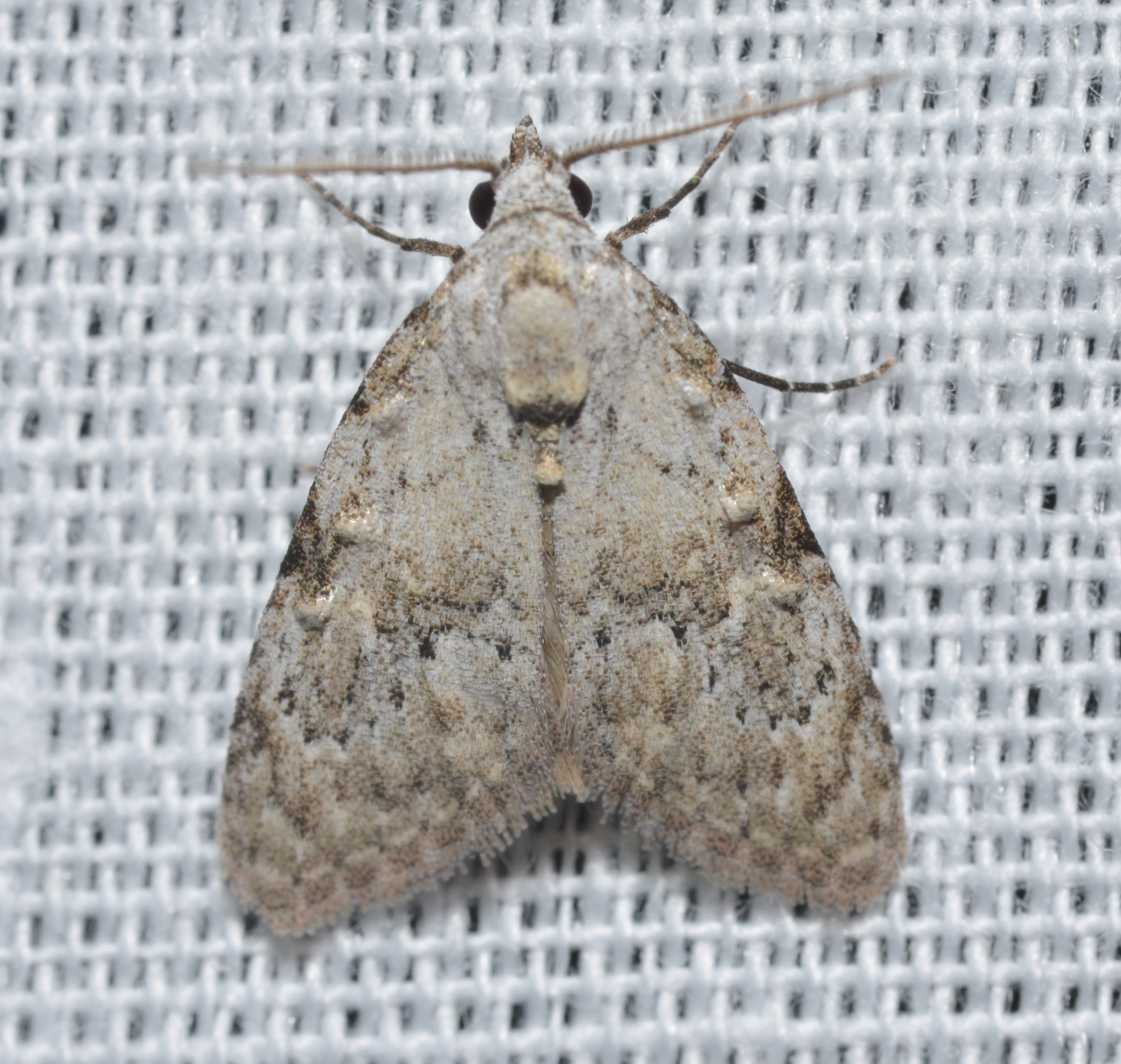

Scientific classification
- Kingdom: Animalia
- Phylum: Arthropoda
- Clade: Pancrustacea
- Class: Insecta
- Order: Lepidoptera
- Superfamily: Noctuoidea
- Family: Nolidae
- Genus: Meganola
- Species: M. minuscula

Binomial name
- Meganola minuscula (Zeller, 1872)

= Meganola minuscula =

Species of moth

Meganola minuscula, the confused meganola, is a nolid moth (family Nolidae). The species was first described by Philipp Christoph Zeller in 1872. It is found in North America.

The MONA or Hodges number for Meganola minuscula is 8983.

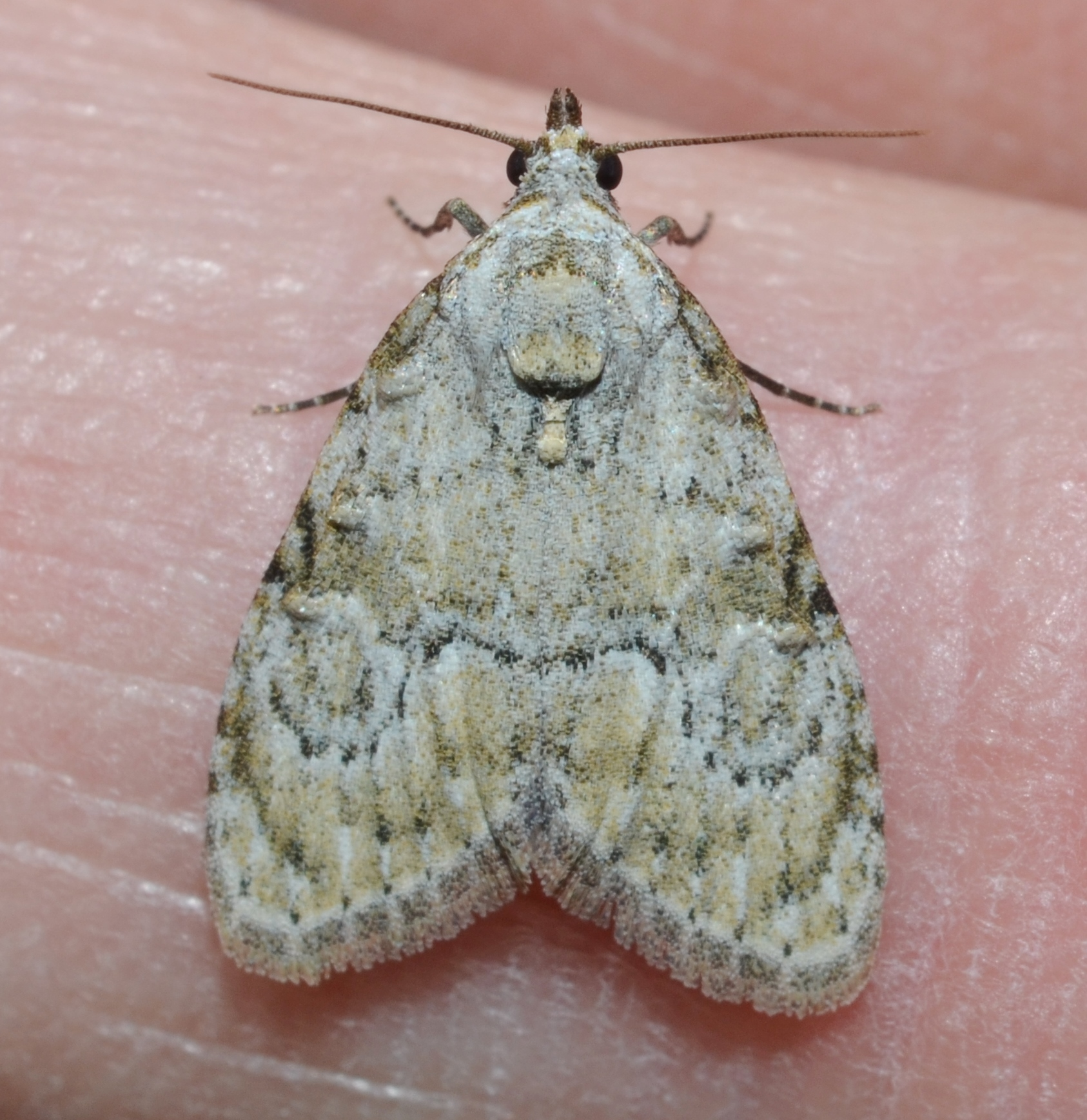
