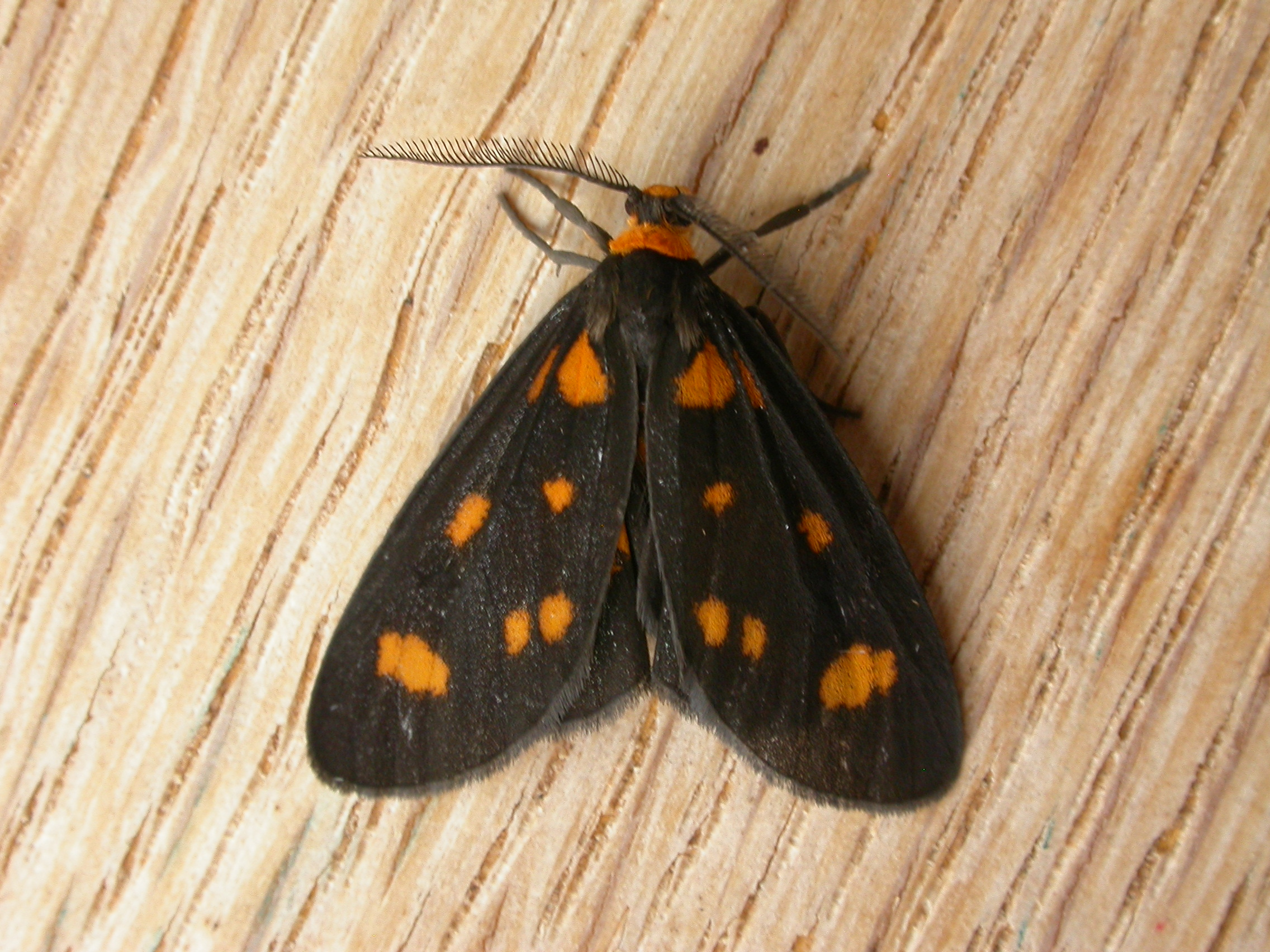
- Asura cervicalis

Scientific classification
- Kingdom: Animalia
- Phylum: Arthropoda
- Class: Insecta
- Order: Lepidoptera
- Superfamily: Noctuoidea
- Family: Erebidae
- Subfamily: Arctiinae
- Tribe: Lithosiini
- Subtribe: Nudariina
- Genus: Asura; Walker, 1854

Synonyms
- Tumicla Wallengren, 1863; Stonia Walker, [1865]

= Asura (moth) =

Genus of moths

Asura is a genus of moths in the subfamily Arctiinae, and subtribe Nudariina erected by Francis Walker in 1854. It is also curiously the centre-most genus in the App, OneZoom.

== Species ==
- Asura albidorsalis Wileman, 1914
- Asura albigrisea (Rothschild, 1913)
- Asura alikangiae (Strand, 1917)
- Asura amabilis Rothschild & Jordan, 1901
- Asura andamana (Moore, 1877)
- Asura anomala (Elwes, 1890)
- Asura arcuata (Moore, 1882)
- Asura arenaria Rothschild, 1913
- Asura asaphes Hampson, 1900
- Asura atritermina Hampson, 1900
- Asura aurantiaca (Moore, 1878)
- Asura aureata Rothschild, 1913
- Asura aureorosea (Rothschild, 1913)
- Asura aurora (Hampson, 1891)
- Asura avernalis (Butler, 1887)
- Asura bipars (Walker, 1865)
- Asura bipartita Rothschild, 1916
- Asura biplagiata (Rothschild, 1913)
- Asura biseriata Hampson, 1900
- Asura bizonoides (Walker, 1862)
- Asura brunneofasciata Bethune-Baker, 1904
- Asura calamaria (Moore, 1888)
- Asura camerunensis Strand, 1912
- Asura carnea (Poujade, 1886)
- Asura catameces Turner, 1940
- Asura cervicalis Walker, 1854
- Asura chrysomela Hampson, 1905
- Asura coccineoflammens Rothschild, 1913
- Asura coccinocosma Turner, 1940
- Asura compsodes Turner, 1940
- Asura confina Hampson, 1900
- Asura congerens (Felder, 1874)
- Asura congoensis Kühne, 2007
- Asura conjunctana (Walker, 1866)
- Asura connexa (Wileman, 1910)
- Asura creatina (Snellen, 1879)
- Asura crocopepla Turner, 1940
- Asura crocoptera Turner, 1940
- Asura crocota Hampson, 1900
- Asura cruciata Matsumura, 1927
- Asura cuneifera (Walker, 1862)
- Asura cuneigera (Walker, 1862)
- Asura cylletona (Swinhoe, 1893)
- Asura dasara (Moore, 1859)
- Asura dentifera Hampson, 1900
- Asura dharma (Moore, 1879)
- Asura diluta Draeseke, 1926
- Asura dinawa Bethune-Baker, 1904
- Asura discisigna (Moore, 1878)
- Asura disticha (Meyrick, 1894)
- Asura distyi Kühne, 2007
- Asura doa Kühne, 2007
- Asura eala Kühne, 2007
- Asura ecmelaena Hampson, 1900
- Asura eichhorni Rothschild, 1936
- Asura elegans Reich, 1937
- Asura eos Hampson, 1900
- Asura erythrias (Holland, 1893)
- Asura esmia (Swinhoe, 1894)
- Asura euprepioides (Walker, 1862)
- Asura flavagraphia van Eecke, 1929
- Asura flaveola Bethune-Baker, 1904
- Asura flavida (Butler, 1887)
- Asura flavivenosa (Moore, 1878)
- Asura floccosa (Walker, 1864)
- Asura friederikeae Kühne, 2007
- Asura frigida (Walker, 1854)
- Asura fulvimarginata Hampson, 1904
- Asura furcata Reich, 1936
- Asura fuscalis (Hampson, 1891)
- Asura gigantea Kühne, 2007
- Asura griseata (Leech, 1899)
- Asura haemachroa Hampson, 1905
- Asura hemixantha Hampson, 1900
- Asura hermanni Kühne, 2007
- Asura hilaris (Walker, 1854)
- Asura hopkinsi Tams, 1935
- Asura horishanella Matsumura, 1927
- Asura humilis (Walker, 1854)
- Asura ila (Moore, 1859)
- Asura inconspicua (Moore, 1878)
- Asura infumata (Felder, 1874)
- Asura insularis Rothschild, 1913
- Asura intermedia Marumo, 1923
- Asura irregularis (Rothschild, 1913)
- Asura latimargo Roepke, 1946
- Asura likiangensis Daniel, 1952
- Asura liparidia Rothschild, 1913
- Asura lutara (Moore, [1860])
- Asura lutarella Kalis, 1934
- Asura lutea Bethune-Baker, 1908
- Asura luzonica Wileman & South, 1919
- Asura lydia Donovan, 1805
- Asura magica Strand, 1917
- Asura manusi Rothschild, 1916
- Asura marginata (Walker, 1864)
- Asura marginatana Strand, 1922
- Asura mediofascia Rothschild, 1913
- Asura megala Hampson, 1900
- Asura melanoleuca (Hampson, 1894)
- Asura melanopyga Hampson, 1918
- Asura melanoxantha Hampson, 1914
- Asura metahyala Hampson, 1918
- Asura metamelas (Hampson, 1893)
- Asura metascota Hampson, 1905
- Asura miltochristina Rothschild, 1913
- Asura mimetica Rothschild, 1913
- Asura modesta (Leech, 1899)
- Asura monospila Turner, 1940
- Asura mutabilis Kühne, 2007
- Asura nebulosa (Moore, 1878)
- Asura nigriciliata Hampson, 1900
- Asura nigripuncta Wileman
- Asura nigrivena (Leech, 1899)
- Asura nubifascia (Walker, 1864)
- Asura nubilalis (Hampson, 1894)
- Asura obliquilinea (Swinhoe, 1901)
- Asura obscurodiscalis Rothschild, 1936
- Asura obsoleta (Moore, 1878)
- Asura ocellata Wileman
- Asura ochreomaculata Bethune-Baker, 1904
- Asura ocnerioides Rothschild, 1913
- Asura octiger van Eecke, 1929
- Asura orsova Swinhoe, 1903
- Asura owgarra Bethune-Baker, 1908
- Asura parallelina (Hampson, 1894)
- Asura parallina (Hampson, 1894)
- Asura peloa (Swinhoe, 1904)
- Asura percurrens Hampson, 1914
- Asura perihaemia Hampson, 1900
- Asura phaeobasis Hampson, 1900
- Asura phaeoplagia Hampson, 1900
- Asura phaeosticta Kiriakoff, 1958
- Asura phantasma Hampson, 1907
- Asura pinkurata Kühne, 2007
- Asura platyrhabda Tams, 1935
- Asura polyspila Turner, 1940
- Asura postbicolor Rothschild, 1913
- Asura pseudojosiodes Rothschild, 1913
- Asura pudibunda Hampson, 1900
- Asura punctilineata Wileman & South, 1919
- Asura pyropa Tams, 1935
- Asura pyrostrota Hampson, 1914
- Asura quadrilineata (Pagenstecher, 1886)
- Asura reversa Rothschild, 1916
- Asura rhabdota Rothschild, 1920
- Asura rosacea Bethune-Baker, 1904
- Asura roseogrisea Rothschild, 1913
- Asura rubricosa (Moore, 1878)
- Asura rubrimargo (Hampson, 1894)
- Asura ruenca (Swinhoe, 1892)
- Asura ruptifascia (Hampson, 1893)
- Asura russula Kiriakoff, 1963
- Asura sagittaria Bethune-Baker, 1904
- Asura semifascia (Walker, 1854)
- Asura semivitrea (Rothschild, 1913)
- Asura septemmaculata (Heylaerts, 1891)
- Asura serratilinea (Turner, 1940)
- Asura sexpuncta (Hampson, 1894)
- Asura simillima Rothschild, 1936
- Asura simplifascia (Elwes, 1890)
- Asura snelleni Roepke, 1943
- Asura solita (Walker, 1854)
- Asura spinata Kühne, 2007
- Asura striata Wileman, 1910
- Asura strigatula Rothschild, 1913
- Asura strigibasis de Joannis, 1930
- Asura strigipennis (Herrich-Schaffer, 1914)
- Asura subcruciata Rothschild, 1913
- Asura synestramena Hampson, 1900
- Asura temperata (Holland, 1893)
- Asura thomensis Rothschild, 1913
- Asura toxodes Hampson, 1907
- Asura tricolor (Wileman, 1910)
- Asura trifasciata Roepke, 1946
- Asura tripuncta (Reich, 1935)
- Asura trizonata Rothschild, 1913
- Asura truncata (Rothschild, 1913)
- Asura umbrifera Hampson, 1900
- Asura umbrosa (Hampson, 1896)
- Asura undulosa (Walker, 1854)
- Asura unicolora Bethune-Baker, 1904
- Asura uniformeola Hampson, 1900
- Asura uniformis (Hampson, 1893)
- Asura unilinea Wileman
- Asura unipuncta (Leech, 1890)
- Asura varians (Hampson, 1893)
- Asura versicolor Kühne, 2007
- Asura vivida (Walker, [1865])
- Asura wandammensis Joicey & Talbot, 1916
- Asura xanthophaea Toulgoët, 1977
- Asura zebrina (Hampson, 1914)

== Former species ==
The following species were previously associated with Asura. Species formerly placed in this genus are now in genera Lyclene, Afrasura, Gymnasura, Cyme, Ghoria, Barsine, other genera, or resolved as synonyms of other Asura species.

- Asura acteola
- Asura aegrota
- Asura agraphia
- Asura anaemica
- Asura analogus
- Asura anila
- Asura antemedialis
- Asura aroa
- Asura assamica
- Asura asuroides
- Asura atricraspeda
- Asura atrifusa
- Asura basitessellata
- Asura bella
- Asura biagi
- Asura birivula
- Asura bougainvillei
- Asura bougainvillicola
- Asura butleri
- Asura callinoma
- Asura cancellata
- Asura celidopa
- Asura celipodoa
- Asura chromatica
- Asura chypsilon
- Asura circumdata
- Asura citrinopuncta
- Asura citronopuncta
- Asura clara
- Asura clavula
- Asura coccineoflammea
- Asura conflua
- Asura confluens
- Asura craigi
- Asura crenulata
- Asura crustata
- Asura curvifascia
- Asura cyclota
- Asura dampierensis
- Asura decisigna
- Asura decurrens
- Asura dentiferoides
- Asura depuncta
- Asura diffusa
- Asura dirhabdus
- Asura discistriga
- Asura discocellularis
- Asura discoidalis
- Asura dividata
- Asura duplicata
- Asura effulgens
- Asura eschara
- Asura evora
- Asura excurrens
- Asura fasciolata
- Asura feminina
- Asura flagrans
- Asura flavescens
- Asura floridensis
- Asura formosicola
- Asura fruhstorferi
- Asura fulguritis
- Asura fulvia
- Asura fusca
- Asura fuscifera
- Asura fuscifusa
- Asura gabunica
- Asura gaudens
- Asura geminata
- Asura geodetis
- Asura griseotincta
- Asura grisescens
- Asura guntheri
- Asura habrotis
- Asura hieroglyphica
- Asura hilara
- Asura homogena
- Asura hyporhoda
- Asura ichorina
- Asura inclusa
- Asura incompleta
- Asura indecisa
- Asura inornata
- Asura intensa
- Asura interserta
- Asura intrita
- Asura isabelina
- Asura javanica
- Asura kangrana
- Asura ktimuna
- Asura lacteoflava
- Asura limbata
- Asura mediastina
- Asura mediopuncta
- Asura melitaula
- Asura mienshanica
- Asura miltochristaemorpha
- Asura moluccensis
- Asura mylea
- Asura natalensis
- Asura neavi
- Asura numida
- Asura obliqua
- Asura obliquata
- Asura obliterans
- Asura obliterata
- Asura obsolescens
- Asura ochracea
- Asura ochrostraminea
- Asura pallida
- Asura pectinata
- Asura pectinella
- Asura peripherica
- Asura perpusilla
- Asura phryctopa
- Asura phryctops
- Asura placens
- Asura porphyrea
- Asura postfasciatus
- Asura postfusca
- Asura postica
- Asura pseudaurora
- Asura punctata
- Asura punctifascia
- Asura punctilinea
- Asura pyraula
- Asura pyrauloides
- Asura quadrifasciata
- Asura reducta
- Asura reticulata
- Asura rhodina
- Asura rivulosa
- Asura rosea
- Asura rubricans
- Asura rufostria
- Asura rufotincta
- Asura sagenaria
- Asura samboanganus
- Asura scripta
- Asura semicirculata
- Asura senara
- Asura sexualis
- Asura signata
- Asura simplicifascia
- Asura simulans
- Asura sinica
- Asura spurrelli
- Asura straminea
- Asura strigata
- Asura strigulata
- Asura suavis
- Asura subcervina
- Asura subfulvia
- Asura submarmorata
- Asura suffusa
- Asura sullia
- Asura szetschwanica
- Asura tabida
- Asura terminata
- Asura tessellata
- Asura tibada
- Asura triangularis
- Asura undulata
- Asura unifascia
- Asura variabilis
- Asura violacea
- Asura wandammenensae
- Asura xantha
- Asura xantherythra
