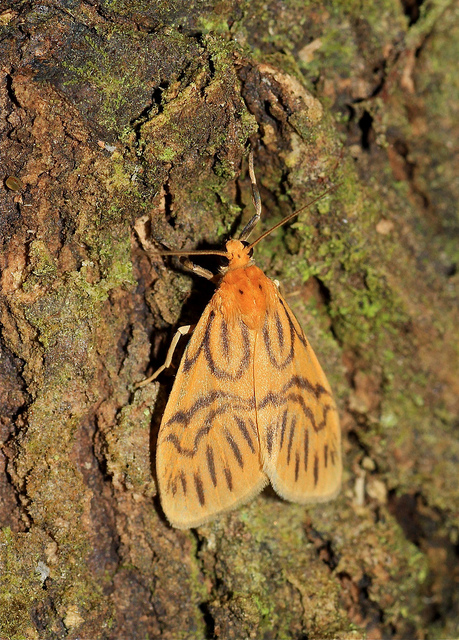

Scientific classification
- Kingdom: Animalia
- Phylum: Arthropoda
- Class: Insecta
- Order: Lepidoptera
- Superfamily: Noctuoidea
- Family: Erebidae
- Subfamily: Arctiinae
- Genus: Asura
- Species: A. fulguritis

Binomial name
- Asura fulguritis Hampson, 1900

Synonyms
- Asura birivula Hampson, 1900

= Asura fulguritis =

Species of moth

Asura fulguritis is a lichen moth of the family Erebidae, subfamily Arctiinae. The species was first described by George Hampson in 1900. It is found on Bali, Java, Sumatra, Pulo Laut, Borneo and Peninsular Malaysia. The habitat consists of lowland and lower montane forests.

== Subspecies ==
- Asura fulguritis fulguritis (Bali, Java, Sumatra, Pulo Laut)
- Asura fulguritis birivula Hampson, 1900 (Borneo, Peninsular Malaysia)
