= Asura cylletona =

Scientific classification
- Domain: Eukaryota
- Kingdom: Animalia
- Phylum: Arthropoda
- Class: Insecta
- Order: Lepidoptera
- Superfamily: Noctuoidea
- Family: Erebidae
- Subfamily: Arctiinae
- Genus: Asura
- Species: A. cylletona

Binomial name
- Asura cylletona (C. Swinhoe, 1893)

Synonyms
- Setinochroa cylletona C. Swinhoe, 1893; Miltochrista geodetis Meyrick, 1894

Species of moth

Asura cylletona is a moth of the family Erebidae first described by Charles Swinhoe in 1893. It is found in Myanmar.
