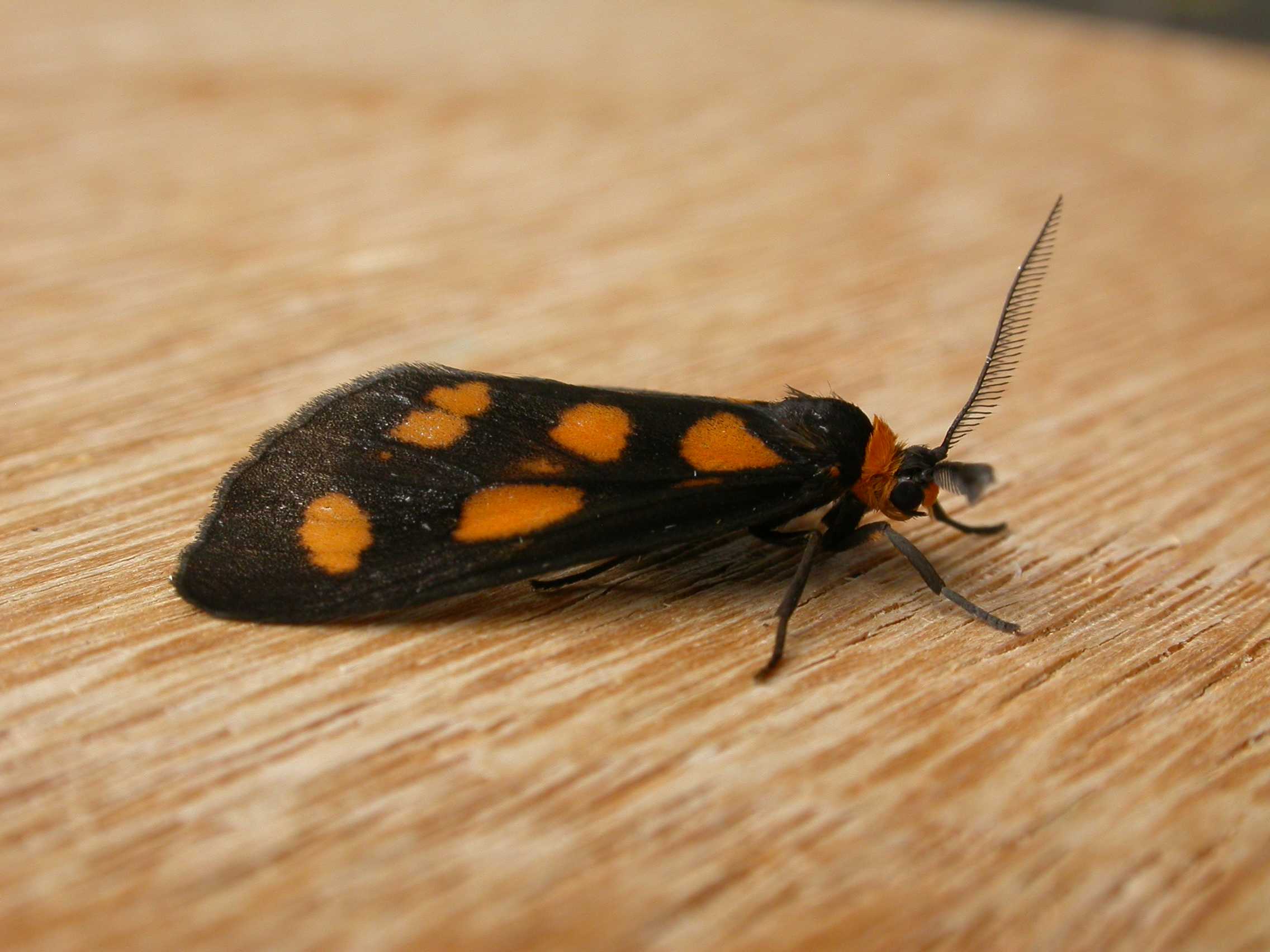

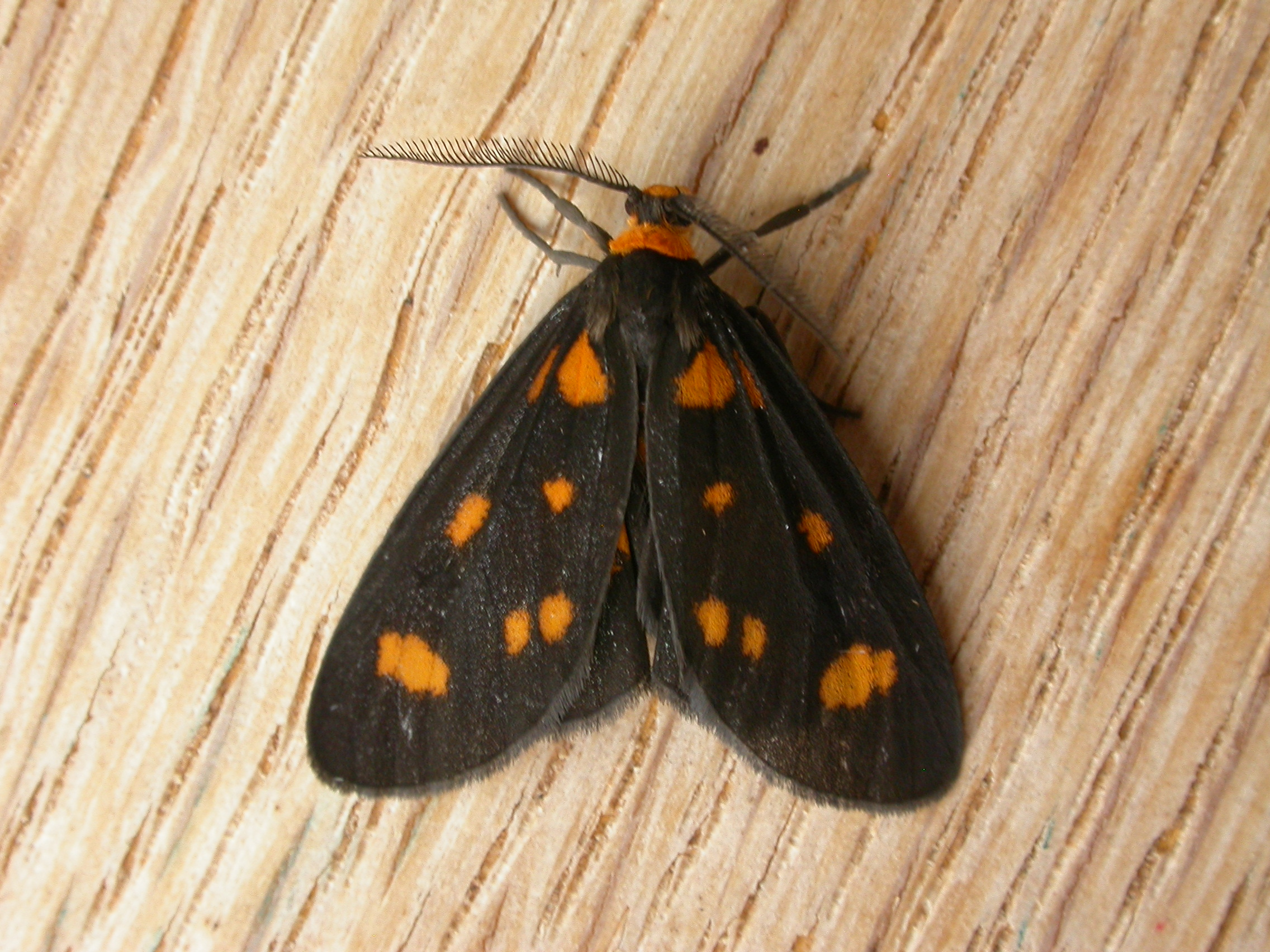

Scientific classification
- Kingdom: Animalia
- Phylum: Arthropoda
- Class: Insecta
- Order: Lepidoptera
- Superfamily: Noctuoidea
- Family: Erebidae
- Subfamily: Arctiinae
- Genus: Asura
- Species: A. cervicalis

Binomial name
- Asura cervicalis Walker, 1854

Synonyms
- Asura obliterans Draudt, 1914

= Asura cervicalis =

Species of moth

Asura cervicalis is a species of moth of the family Erebidae. It is known from the non-tropical parts of eastern Australia, including areas of New South Wales, Queensland and Victoria. The wingspan is about 15 mm (0.59 in).

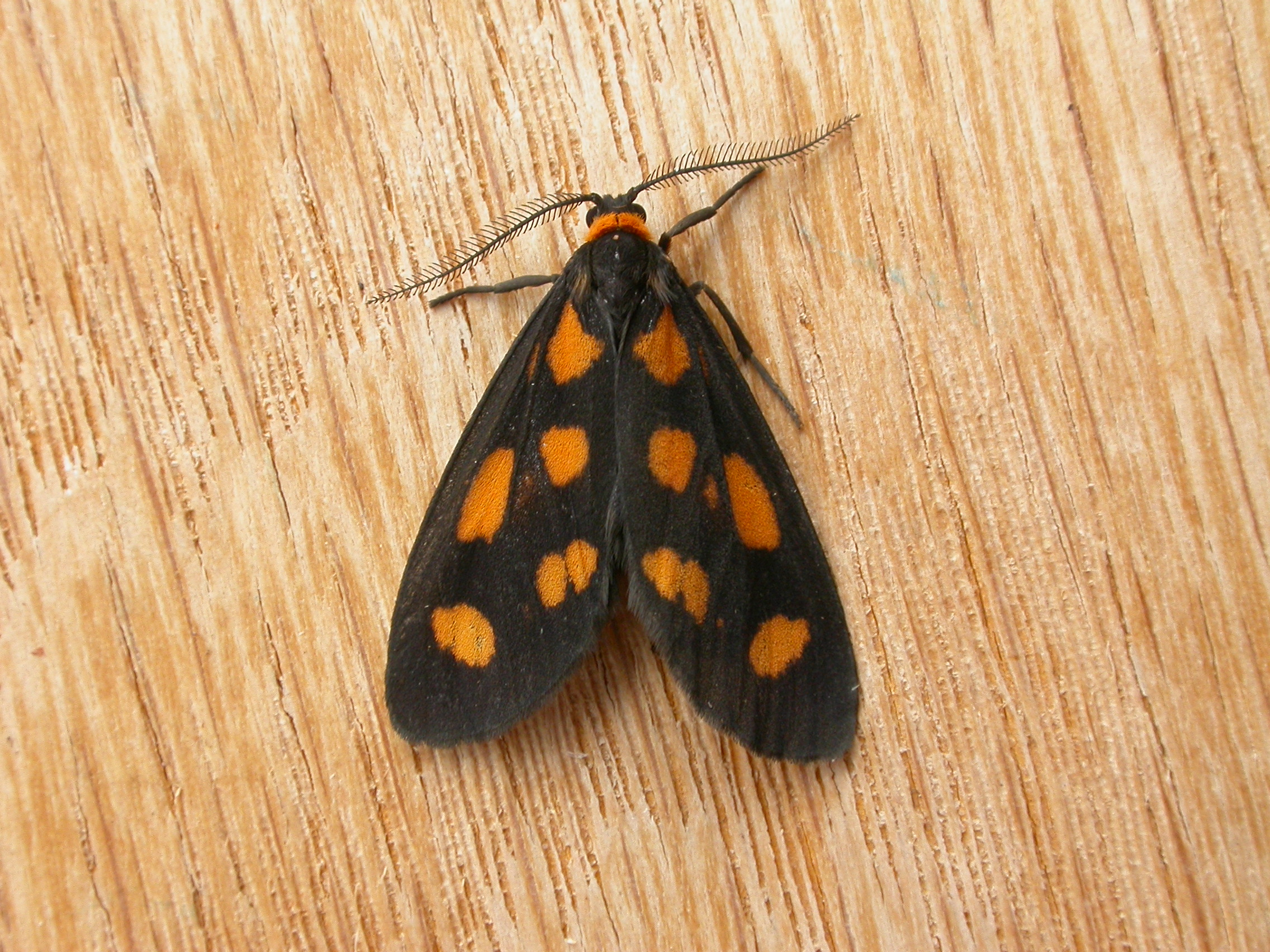
Asura cervicalis
