= Asura russula =

Scientific classification
- Kingdom: Animalia
- Phylum: Arthropoda
- Class: Insecta
- Order: Lepidoptera
- Superfamily: Noctuoidea
- Family: Erebidae
- Subfamily: Arctiinae
- Genus: Asura
- Species: A. russula

Binomial name
- Asura russula Kiriakoff, 1963

Species of moth

Asura russula is a moth of the family Erebidae. It was described by Sergius G. Kiriakoff in 1963. It is found in the Democratic Republic of the Congo.
