= Asura flaveola =

Scientific classification
- Domain: Eukaryota
- Kingdom: Animalia
- Phylum: Arthropoda
- Class: Insecta
- Order: Lepidoptera
- Superfamily: Noctuoidea
- Family: Erebidae
- Subfamily: Arctiinae
- Genus: Asura
- Species: A. flaveola

Binomial name
- Asura flaveola Bethune-Baker, 1904

Species of moth

Asura flaveola is a moth of the family Erebidae. It is found in New Guinea.
