= Asura obliquilinea =

Scientific classification
- Domain: Eukaryota
- Kingdom: Animalia
- Phylum: Arthropoda
- Class: Insecta
- Order: Lepidoptera
- Superfamily: Noctuoidea
- Family: Erebidae
- Subfamily: Arctiinae
- Genus: Asura
- Species: A. obliquilinea

Binomial name
- Asura obliquilinea (C. Swinhoe, 1901)

Synonyms
- Lyclene obliquilinea C. Swinhoe, 1901

Species of moth

Asura obliquilinea is a moth of the family Erebidae first described by Charles Swinhoe in 1901. It is found in India.
