= Asura pyrostrota =

Scientific classification
- Kingdom: Animalia
- Phylum: Arthropoda
- Class: Insecta
- Order: Lepidoptera
- Superfamily: Noctuoidea
- Family: Erebidae
- Subfamily: Arctiinae
- Genus: Asura
- Species: A. pyrostrota

Binomial name
- Asura pyrostrota Hampson, 1914

Species of moth

Asura pyrostrota is a moth of the family Erebidae. It is found on the Solomon Islands.
