= Asura ruenca =

Scientific classification
- Domain: Eukaryota
- Kingdom: Animalia
- Phylum: Arthropoda
- Class: Insecta
- Order: Lepidoptera
- Superfamily: Noctuoidea
- Family: Erebidae
- Subfamily: Arctiinae
- Genus: Asura
- Species: A. ruenca

Binomial name
- Asura ruenca (C. Swinhoe, 1892)

Synonyms
- Lyclene ruenca C. Swinhoe, 1892

Species of moth

Asura ruenca is a moth of the family Erebidae first described by Charles Swinhoe in 1892. It is found on the Sula Islands of Indonesia.
