= Asura confina =

Scientific classification
- Kingdom: Animalia
- Phylum: Arthropoda
- Class: Insecta
- Order: Lepidoptera
- Superfamily: Noctuoidea
- Family: Erebidae
- Subfamily: Arctiinae
- Genus: Asura
- Species: A. confina

Binomial name
- Asura confina Hampson, 1900

Synonyms
- Asura conflua Hampson, 1914

Species of moth

Asura confina is a moth of the family Erebidae. It is found in New Guinea.
