= Asura septemmaculata =

Scientific classification
- Domain: Eukaryota
- Kingdom: Animalia
- Phylum: Arthropoda
- Class: Insecta
- Order: Lepidoptera
- Superfamily: Noctuoidea
- Family: Erebidae
- Subfamily: Arctiinae
- Genus: Asura
- Species: A. septemmaculata

Binomial name
- Asura septemmaculata (Heylaerts, 1891)

Synonyms
- Hypocrita septemmaculata Heylaerts, 1891; Asura agraphia Hampson

Species of moth

Asura septemmaculata is a moth of the family Erebidae. It is found on Java.
