= Asura undulosa =

Scientific classification
- Kingdom: Animalia
- Phylum: Arthropoda
- Class: Insecta
- Order: Lepidoptera
- Superfamily: Noctuoidea
- Family: Erebidae
- Subfamily: Arctiinae
- Genus: Asura
- Species: A. undulosa

Binomial name
- Asura undulosa (Walker, 1854)

Synonyms
- Cylene undulosa Walker, 1854; Sesapa decurrens Walker, 1864; Sesapa excurrens Walker, 1864; Asura kangrana Strand, 1922; Miltochrista straminea Walker, 1856; Lyclene undulosa (Walker, 1854)

Species of moth

Asura undulosa is a moth of the family Erebidae first described by Francis Walker in 1854. It is found in the north-western Himalayas, Sikkim, Bhutan and Myanmar.
