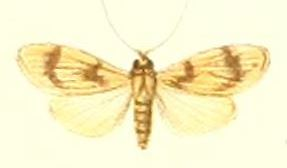
- Asura geminata

Scientific classification
- Domain: Eukaryota
- Kingdom: Animalia
- Phylum: Arthropoda
- Class: Insecta
- Order: Lepidoptera
- Superfamily: Noctuoidea
- Family: Erebidae
- Subfamily: Arctiinae
- Genus: Asura
- Species: A. geminata

Binomial name
- Asura geminata (Pagenstecher, 1900)

Synonyms
- Miltochrista geminata Pagenstecher, 1900

= Asura geminata =

Species of moth

Asura geminata is a moth of the subfamily Arctiinae. It is found in New Pomerania (Papua New Guinea);.
