= Asura modesta =

Scientific classification
- Domain: Eukaryota
- Kingdom: Animalia
- Phylum: Arthropoda
- Class: Insecta
- Order: Lepidoptera
- Superfamily: Noctuoidea
- Family: Erebidae
- Subfamily: Arctiinae
- Genus: Asura
- Species: A. modesta

Binomial name
- Asura modesta (Leech, 1899)

Synonyms
- Setina modesta Leech, 1899

Species of moth

Asura modesta is a moth of the family Erebidae. It is found in China.
