= Asura orsova =

Scientific classification
- Domain: Eukaryota
- Kingdom: Animalia
- Phylum: Arthropoda
- Class: Insecta
- Order: Lepidoptera
- Superfamily: Noctuoidea
- Family: Erebidae
- Subfamily: Arctiinae
- Genus: Asura
- Species: A. orsova

Binomial name
- Asura orsova C. Swinhoe, 1903

Species of moth

Asura orsova is a moth of the family Erebidae first described by Charles Swinhoe in 1903. It is found in Thailand.
