= Asura likiangensis =

Scientific classification
- Domain: Eukaryota
- Kingdom: Animalia
- Phylum: Arthropoda
- Class: Insecta
- Order: Lepidoptera
- Superfamily: Noctuoidea
- Family: Erebidae
- Subfamily: Arctiinae
- Genus: Asura
- Species: A. likiangensis

Binomial name
- Asura likiangensis Daniel, 1952

Species of moth

Asura likiangensis is a moth of the family Erebidae. It is found in China.

== Subspecies ==
- Asura likiangensis likiangensis
- Asura likiangensis grisescens Daniel, 1952 (Yunnan)
