= Asura atritermina =

Scientific classification
- Kingdom: Animalia
- Phylum: Arthropoda
- Class: Insecta
- Order: Lepidoptera
- Superfamily: Noctuoidea
- Family: Erebidae
- Subfamily: Arctiinae
- Genus: Asura
- Species: A. atritermina

Binomial name
- Asura atritermina Hampson, 1900

Species of moth

Asura atritermina is a moth of the family Erebidae. It is found on Sumatra.
