= Asura dasara =

Scientific classification
- Domain: Eukaryota
- Kingdom: Animalia
- Phylum: Arthropoda
- Class: Insecta
- Order: Lepidoptera
- Superfamily: Noctuoidea
- Family: Erebidae
- Subfamily: Arctiinae
- Genus: Asura
- Species: A. dasara

Binomial name
- Asura dasara (Moore, 1859)

Synonyms
- Setina dasara Moore, 1859; Barsine chromatica Swinhoe, 1891; Asura undulata Swinhoe, 1903

Species of moth

Asura dasara is a moth of the family Erebidae. It is found in the north-western Himalayas.
