= Asura albigrisea =

Scientific classification
- Domain: Eukaryota
- Kingdom: Animalia
- Phylum: Arthropoda
- Class: Insecta
- Order: Lepidoptera
- Superfamily: Noctuoidea
- Family: Erebidae
- Subfamily: Arctiinae
- Genus: Asura
- Species: A. albigrisea

Binomial name
- Asura albigrisea (Rothschild, 1913)

Synonyms
- Zygaenosia albigrisea Rothschild, 1913

Species of moth

Asura albigrisea is a moth of the family Erebidae. It is found in New Guinea.
