= Asura bipartita =

Scientific classification
- Kingdom: Animalia
- Phylum: Arthropoda
- Clade: Pancrustacea
- Class: Insecta
- Order: Lepidoptera
- Superfamily: Noctuoidea
- Family: Erebidae
- Subfamily: Arctiinae
- Genus: Asura
- Species: A. bipartita

Binomial name
- Asura bipartita Rothschild, 1916

Species of moth

Asura bipartita is a moth of the family Erebidae. It is found on the Dampier Archipelago.
