= Asura catameces =

Scientific classification
- Domain: Eukaryota
- Kingdom: Animalia
- Phylum: Arthropoda
- Class: Insecta
- Order: Lepidoptera
- Superfamily: Noctuoidea
- Family: Erebidae
- Subfamily: Arctiinae
- Genus: Asura
- Species: A. catameces

Binomial name
- Asura catameces Turner, 1940

Species of moth

Asura catameces is a moth of the family Erebidae. It is found in Australia.
