= Asura serratilinea =

Scientific classification
- Domain: Eukaryota
- Kingdom: Animalia
- Phylum: Arthropoda
- Class: Insecta
- Order: Lepidoptera
- Superfamily: Noctuoidea
- Family: Erebidae
- Subfamily: Arctiinae
- Genus: Asura
- Species: A. serratilinea

Binomial name
- Asura serratilinea (Turner, 1940)

Synonyms
- Pallene serratilinea Turner, 1940; Lyclene serratilinea Turner, 1940

Species of moth

Asura serratilinea is a moth of the family Erebidae. It is found in Australia.
