= Asura uniformis =

Scientific classification
- Kingdom: Animalia
- Phylum: Arthropoda
- Class: Insecta
- Order: Lepidoptera
- Superfamily: Noctuoidea
- Family: Erebidae
- Subfamily: Arctiinae
- Genus: Asura
- Species: A. uniformis

Binomial name
- Asura uniformis (Hampson, 1893)

Synonyms
- Tricholepis uniformis Hampson, 1893

Species of moth

Asura uniformis is a moth of the family Erebidae. It is found in Sri Lanka.

== Description ==
The wingspan is about 24 mm (0.94 in). Hind tibia present two spur pairs. Female is pale brownish fuscous. The vertex of head yellowish and anal tuft is ochreous. Wings semi-hyaline. Forewings have a yellowish tinge.
