= Asura lutara =

Scientific classification
- Domain: Eukaryota
- Kingdom: Animalia
- Phylum: Arthropoda
- Class: Insecta
- Order: Lepidoptera
- Superfamily: Noctuoidea
- Family: Erebidae
- Subfamily: Arctiinae
- Genus: Asura
- Species: A. lutara

Binomial name
- Asura lutara (Moore, [1860])

Synonyms
- Lyclene lutara Moore, [1860]; Setina dividata Snellen, 1880

Species of moth

Asura lutara is a moth of the family Erebidae first described by Frederic Moore in 1860. It is found in Myanmar, Perak, Borneo, Sumatra and Java.
