= Asura parallelina =

Scientific classification
- Kingdom: Animalia
- Phylum: Arthropoda
- Class: Insecta
- Order: Lepidoptera
- Superfamily: Noctuoidea
- Family: Erebidae
- Subfamily: Arctiinae
- Genus: Asura
- Species: A. parallelina

Binomial name
- Asura parallelina (Hampson, 1894)

Synonyms
- Miltochrista parallelina Hampson, 1894; Lyclene parallelina

Species of moth

Asura parallelina is a moth of the family Erebidae. It is found in Myanmar and Thailand.
