= Asura magica =

Scientific classification
- Domain: Eukaryota
- Kingdom: Animalia
- Phylum: Arthropoda
- Class: Insecta
- Order: Lepidoptera
- Superfamily: Noctuoidea
- Family: Erebidae
- Subfamily: Arctiinae
- Genus: Asura
- Species: A. magica

Binomial name
- Asura magica Strand, 1917

Species of moth

Asura magica is a moth of the family Erebidae. It is found in Taiwan.
