= Asura andamana =

Scientific classification
- Domain: Eukaryota
- Kingdom: Animalia
- Phylum: Arthropoda
- Class: Insecta
- Order: Lepidoptera
- Superfamily: Noctuoidea
- Family: Erebidae
- Subfamily: Arctiinae
- Genus: Asura
- Species: A. andamana

Binomial name
- Asura andamana (Moore, 1877)

Synonyms
- Sesapa andamana Moore, 1877

Species of moth

Asura andamana is a moth of the family Erebidae. It is found on the Andamans.
