= Asura creatina =

Scientific classification
- Kingdom: Animalia
- Phylum: Arthropoda
- Class: Insecta
- Order: Lepidoptera
- Superfamily: Noctuoidea
- Family: Erebidae
- Subfamily: Arctiinae
- Genus: Asura
- Species: A. creatina

Binomial name
- Asura creatina (Snellen, 1879)

Synonyms
- Paidia creatina Snellen, 1879; Asura javanica van Eecke, 1920

Species of moth

Asura creatina is a moth of the family Erebidae. It is found on Sulawesi and Java.
