= Asura strigibasis =

Scientific classification
- Domain: Eukaryota
- Kingdom: Animalia
- Phylum: Arthropoda
- Class: Insecta
- Order: Lepidoptera
- Superfamily: Noctuoidea
- Family: Erebidae
- Subfamily: Arctiinae
- Genus: Asura
- Species: A. strigibasis

Binomial name
- Asura strigibasis de Joannis, 1930

Synonyms
- Agrisius strigibasis de Joannis, 1930

Species of moth

Asura strigibasis is a moth of the family Erebidae. It is found in Vietnam.
