= Asura umbrifera =

Scientific classification
- Kingdom: Animalia
- Phylum: Arthropoda
- Class: Insecta
- Order: Lepidoptera
- Superfamily: Noctuoidea
- Family: Erebidae
- Subfamily: Arctiinae
- Genus: Asura
- Species: A. umbrifera

Binomial name
- Asura umbrifera Hampson, 1900

Synonyms
- Barsura umbrifera (Hampson, 1900)

Species of moth

Asura umbrifera is a moth of the family Erebidae first described by George Hampson in 1900. It is found in Tibet.
