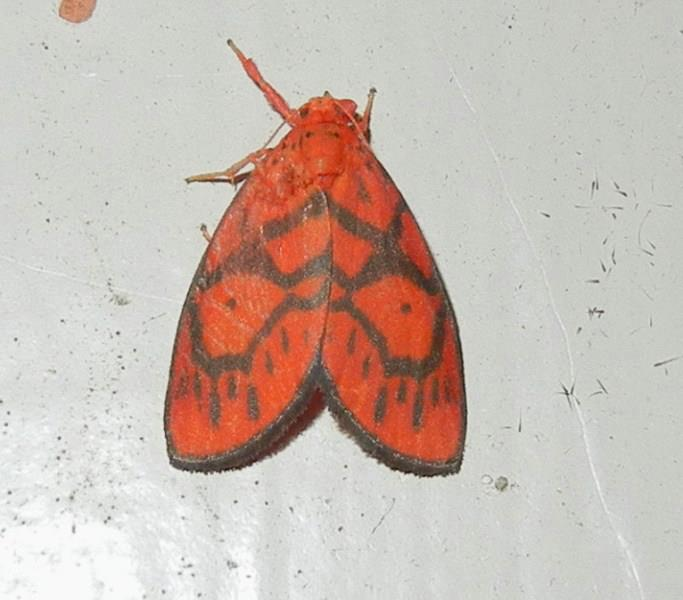

Scientific classification
- Kingdom: Animalia
- Phylum: Arthropoda
- Clade: Pancrustacea
- Class: Insecta
- Order: Lepidoptera
- Superfamily: Noctuoidea
- Family: Erebidae
- Subfamily: Arctiinae
- Genus: Asura
- Species: A. cruciata

Binomial name
- Asura cruciata Matsumura, 1927

Synonyms
- Ammatho convexa, Conicornuta convexa, Miltochristo convexa

= Asura cruciata =

Species of moth

Asura cruciata is a moth of the family Erebidae. It is found in Taiwan.
