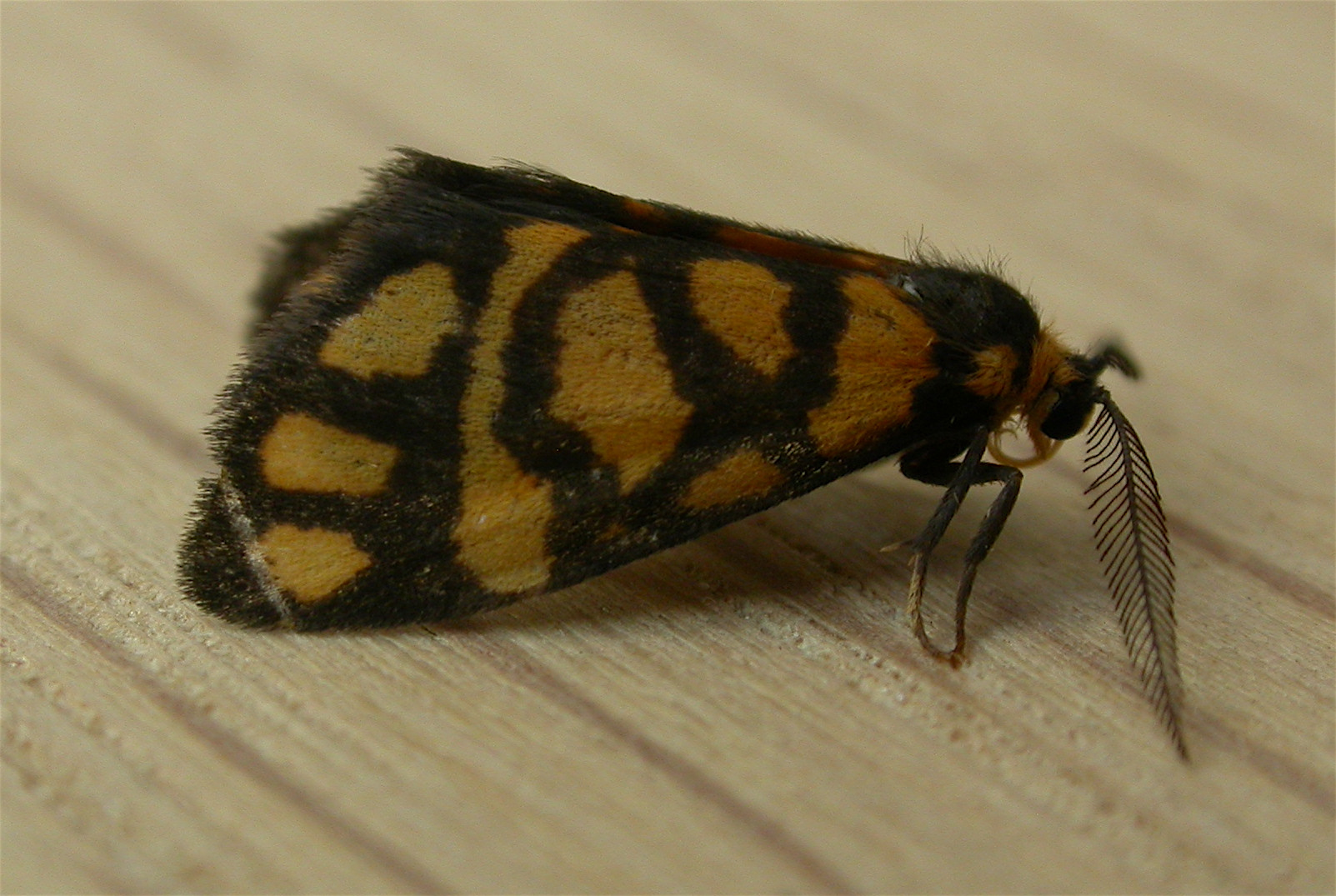

Scientific classification
- Domain: Eukaryota
- Kingdom: Animalia
- Phylum: Arthropoda
- Class: Insecta
- Order: Lepidoptera
- Superfamily: Noctuoidea
- Family: Erebidae
- Subfamily: Arctiinae
- Genus: Asura
- Species: A. lydia

Binomial name
- Asura lydia (Donovan, 1805)

Synonyms
- Bombyx lydia Donovan, 1805; Asura lydia ab. confluens Draudt, 1914; Asura gaudens Walker, 1854; Asura incompleta Draudt, 1914; Dysauxes mediastina Hübner, 1825; Setina pectinata Wallengren, 1860

= Asura lydia =

Lydia lichen moth

Species of moth

Asura lydia, the lydia lichen moth is a moth of the family Erebidae. It is found in Queensland, New South Wales, the Australian Capital Territory and Victoria.

The wingspan is about 15 mm. Adults are black and yellow.
