= Asura striata =

Scientific classification
- Domain: Eukaryota
- Kingdom: Animalia
- Phylum: Arthropoda
- Class: Insecta
- Order: Lepidoptera
- Superfamily: Noctuoidea
- Family: Erebidae
- Subfamily: Arctiinae
- Genus: Asura
- Species: A. striata

Binomial name
- Asura striata Wileman, 1910

Species of moth

Asura striata is a moth of the family Erebidae. It was described by Alfred Ernest Wileman in 1910. It is found in Taiwan.
