= Asura snelleni =

Scientific classification
- Domain: Eukaryota
- Kingdom: Animalia
- Phylum: Arthropoda
- Class: Insecta
- Order: Lepidoptera
- Superfamily: Noctuoidea
- Family: Erebidae
- Subfamily: Arctiinae
- Genus: Asura
- Species: A. snelleni

Binomial name
- Asura snelleni Roepke, 1943

Synonyms
- Asura duplicata Niewenhs., 1948

Species of moth

Asura snelleni is a moth of the family Erebidae. It is found on Java.

== Subspecies ==
- Asura snelleni snelleni
- Asura snelleni duplicata Niewenhs., 1948 (Bangzaai Archipelago)
