= Asura vivida =

Scientific classification
- Kingdom: Animalia
- Phylum: Arthropoda
- Class: Insecta
- Order: Lepidoptera
- Superfamily: Noctuoidea
- Family: Erebidae
- Subfamily: Arctiinae
- Genus: Asura
- Species: A. vivida

Binomial name
- Asura vivida (Walker, [1865])

Synonyms
- Barsine vivida Walker, [1865]

Species of moth

Asura vivida is a moth of the family Erebidae first described by Francis Walker in 1865. It is found on Sulawesi and the Bacan Islands in Indonesia.
