= Asura unipuncta =

Scientific classification
- Domain: Eukaryota
- Kingdom: Animalia
- Phylum: Arthropoda
- Class: Insecta
- Order: Lepidoptera
- Superfamily: Noctuoidea
- Family: Erebidae
- Subfamily: Arctiinae
- Genus: Asura
- Species: A. unipuncta

Binomial name
- Asura unipuncta (Leech, 1890)

Synonyms
- Setina unipuncta Leech, 1890; Lyclene szetschwanica Daniel, 1952

Species of moth

Asura unipuncta is a moth of the family Erebidae. It is found in China.

== Subspecies ==
- Asura unipuncta unipuncta
- Asura unipuncta mienshanica Daniel, 1952 (Shensi)
- Asura unipuncta szetschwanica (Daniel, 1952)
