= Asura aurora =

Scientific classification
- Kingdom: Animalia
- Phylum: Arthropoda
- Class: Insecta
- Order: Lepidoptera
- Superfamily: Noctuoidea
- Family: Erebidae
- Subfamily: Arctiinae
- Genus: Asura
- Species: A. aurora

Binomial name
- Asura aurora (Hampson, 1891)

Synonyms
- Lyclene aurora Hampson, 1891

Species of moth

Asura aurora is a moth of the family Erebidae. It is found in India.
