= Asura semivitrea =

Scientific classification
- Domain: Eukaryota
- Kingdom: Animalia
- Phylum: Arthropoda
- Class: Insecta
- Order: Lepidoptera
- Superfamily: Noctuoidea
- Family: Erebidae
- Subfamily: Arctiinae
- Genus: Asura
- Species: A. semivitrea

Binomial name
- Asura semivitrea (Rothschild, 1913)

Synonyms
- Eutane semivitrea Rothschild, 1913

Species of moth

Asura semivitrea is a moth of the family Erebidae. It is found in Australia (Queensland).
