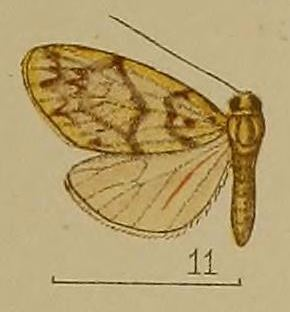

Scientific classification
- Kingdom: Animalia
- Phylum: Arthropoda
- Class: Insecta
- Order: Lepidoptera
- Superfamily: Noctuoidea
- Family: Erebidae
- Subfamily: Arctiinae
- Genus: Asura
- Species: A. toxodes

Binomial name
- Asura toxodes Hampson, 1907

= Asura toxodes =

Species of moth

Asura toxodes is a moth of the family Erebidae. It is found on the Andamans.
