= Asura tripuncta =

Scientific classification
- Domain: Eukaryota
- Kingdom: Animalia
- Phylum: Arthropoda
- Class: Insecta
- Order: Lepidoptera
- Superfamily: Noctuoidea
- Family: Erebidae
- Subfamily: Arctiinae
- Genus: Asura
- Species: A. tripuncta

Binomial name
- Asura tripuncta (Reich, 1935)

Synonyms
- Lyclene tripuncta Reich, 1935

Species of moth

Asura tripuncta is a moth of the family Erebidae. It is found in India.
