= Asura distyi =

Scientific classification
- Kingdom: Animalia
- Phylum: Arthropoda
- Clade: Pancrustacea
- Class: Insecta
- Order: Lepidoptera
- Superfamily: Noctuoidea
- Family: Erebidae
- Subfamily: Arctiinae
- Genus: Asura
- Species: A. distyi

Binomial name
- Asura distyi Kühne, 2007

Synonyms
- Tumicla distyi (Kühne, 2007)

Species of moth

Asura distyi is a moth of the family Erebidae. It was described by Lars Kühne in 2007. It is found in Ghana.
