= Asura hilaris =

Scientific classification
- Kingdom: Animalia
- Phylum: Arthropoda
- Class: Insecta
- Order: Lepidoptera
- Superfamily: Noctuoidea
- Family: Erebidae
- Subfamily: Arctiinae
- Genus: Asura
- Species: A. hilaris

Binomial name
- Asura hilaris (Walker, 1854)

Synonyms
- Doliche hilaris Walker, 1854

Species of moth

Asura hilaris is a moth of the family Erebidae. It is found in Sri Lanka and on Java.
