= Asura frigida =

Scientific classification
- Kingdom: Animalia
- Phylum: Arthropoda
- Class: Insecta
- Order: Lepidoptera
- Superfamily: Noctuoidea
- Family: Erebidae
- Subfamily: Arctiinae
- Genus: Asura
- Species: A. frigida

Binomial name
- Asura frigida (Walker, 1854)

Synonyms
- Doliche frigida Walker, 1854; Lyclene diffusa Walker, 1862; Asura griseotincta Rothschild, 1913; Adites frigida Walker, 1854

Species of moth

Asura frigida is a moth of the family Erebidae. It is found in India.
