= Asura bipars =

Scientific classification
- Kingdom: Animalia
- Phylum: Arthropoda
- Class: Insecta
- Order: Lepidoptera
- Superfamily: Noctuoidea
- Family: Erebidae
- Subfamily: Arctiinae
- Genus: Asura
- Species: A. bipars

Binomial name
- Asura bipars (Walker, 1865)

Synonyms
- Stonia bipars Walker, 1865; Asura habrotis Meyrick, 1886

Species of moth

Asura bipars is a moth of the family Erebidae. It is found in Queensland and New South Wales.

The wingspan is about 20 mm. Adults are black with yellow spots.
