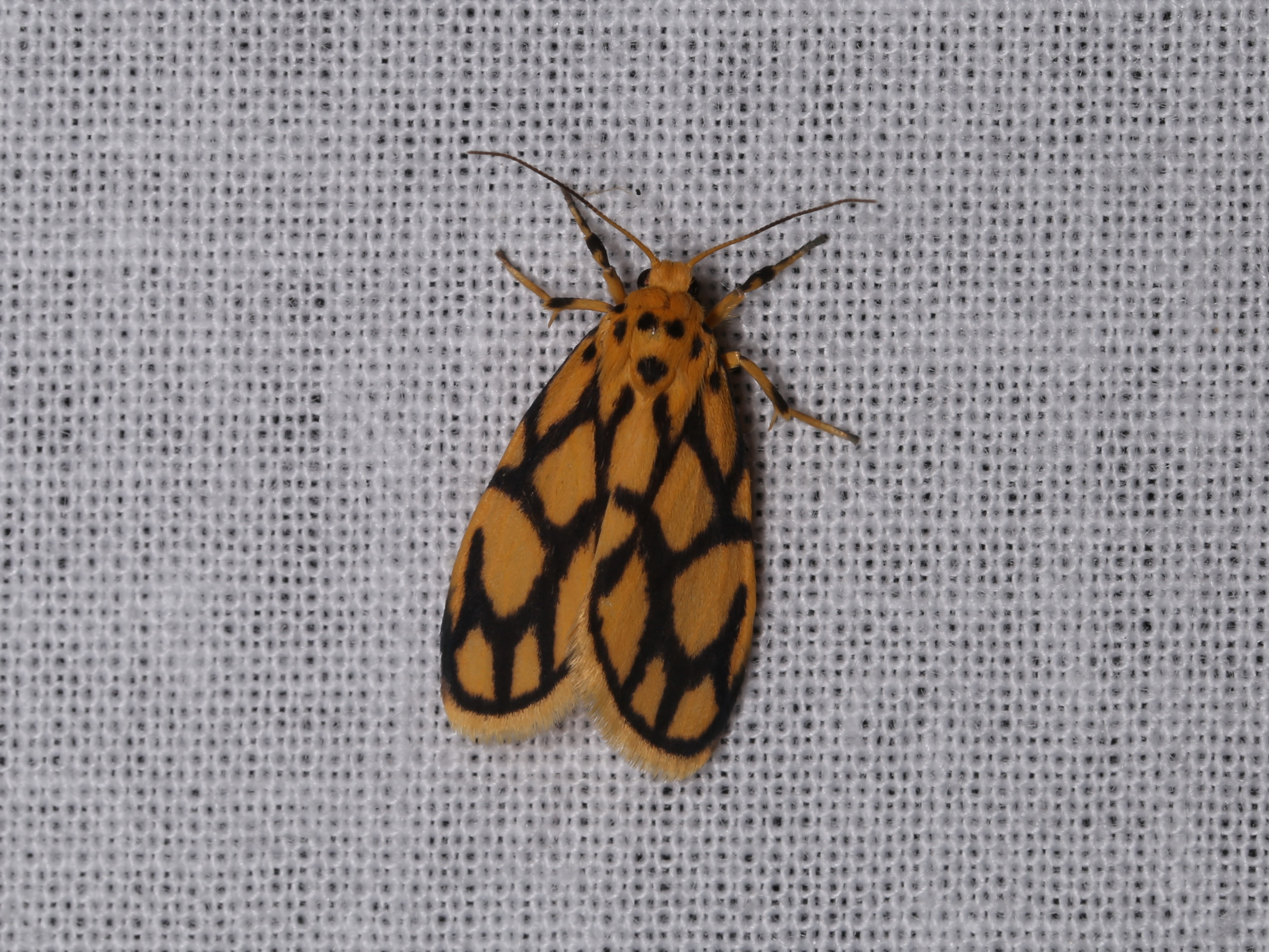

Scientific classification
- Kingdom: Animalia
- Phylum: Arthropoda
- Class: Insecta
- Order: Lepidoptera
- Superfamily: Noctuoidea
- Family: Erebidae
- Subfamily: Arctiinae
- Genus: Asura
- Species: A. conjunctana

Binomial name
- Asura conjunctana (Walker, 1866)

Synonyms
- Conchylis conjunctana Walker, 1866; Barsine eschara Swinhoe, 1894; Miltochrista tessellata Butler, 1881

= Asura conjunctana =

Species of moth

Asura conjunctana is a moth of the family Erebidae. It is found in India.
