= Asura nubilalis =

Scientific classification
- Kingdom: Animalia
- Phylum: Arthropoda
- Class: Insecta
- Order: Lepidoptera
- Superfamily: Noctuoidea
- Family: Erebidae
- Subfamily: Arctiinae
- Genus: Asura
- Species: A. nubilalis

Binomial name
- Asura nubilalis (Hampson, 1894)

Synonyms
- Miltochrista nubilalis Hampson, 1894

Species of moth

Asura nubilalis is a moth of the family Erebidae. It is found on Java.
