= Asura biseriata =

Scientific classification
- Kingdom: Animalia
- Phylum: Arthropoda
- Class: Insecta
- Order: Lepidoptera
- Superfamily: Noctuoidea
- Family: Erebidae
- Subfamily: Arctiinae
- Genus: Asura
- Species: A. biseriata

Binomial name
- Asura biseriata Hampson, 1900

Synonyms
- Lyclene biseriata

Species of moth

Asura biseriata is a moth of the family Erebidae. It is found on Borneo. The habitat consists of lowland areas.
