= Asura luzonica =

Scientific classification
- Domain: Eukaryota
- Kingdom: Animalia
- Phylum: Arthropoda
- Class: Insecta
- Order: Lepidoptera
- Superfamily: Noctuoidea
- Family: Erebidae
- Subfamily: Arctiinae
- Genus: Asura
- Species: A. luzonica

Binomial name
- Asura luzonica Wileman & South, 1919

Synonyms
- Lyclene luzonica

Species of moth

Asura luzonica is a moth of the family Erebidae. It is found on the Philippines (Luzon).
