= Asura lutarella =

Scientific classification
- Domain: Eukaryota
- Kingdom: Animalia
- Phylum: Arthropoda
- Class: Insecta
- Order: Lepidoptera
- Superfamily: Noctuoidea
- Family: Erebidae
- Subfamily: Arctiinae
- Genus: Asura
- Species: A. lutarella

Binomial name
- Asura lutarella Kalis, 1934

Species of moth

Asura lutarella is a moth of the family Erebidae. It is found on Java.
