= Asura disticha =

Scientific classification
- Kingdom: Animalia
- Phylum: Arthropoda
- Class: Insecta
- Order: Lepidoptera
- Superfamily: Noctuoidea
- Family: Erebidae
- Subfamily: Arctiinae
- Genus: Asura
- Species: A. disticha

Binomial name
- Asura disticha (Meyrick, 1894)

Synonyms
- Ammatho disticha Meyrick, 1894; Stigmatophora disticha (Meyrick, 1894

Species of moth

Asura disticha is a moth of the family Erebidae first described by Edward Meyrick in 1894. It is found in Myanmar.
