= Asura esmia =

Scientific classification
- Domain: Eukaryota
- Kingdom: Animalia
- Phylum: Arthropoda
- Class: Insecta
- Order: Lepidoptera
- Superfamily: Noctuoidea
- Family: Erebidae
- Subfamily: Arctiinae
- Genus: Asura
- Species: A. esmia

Binomial name
- Asura esmia (C. Swinhoe, 1894)

Synonyms
- Miltochrista callinoma Meyrick, 1894; Miltochrista esmia C. Swinhoe, 1894

Species of moth

Asura esmia is a moth of the family Erebidae first described by Charles Swinhoe in 1894. It is found in Myanmar.
