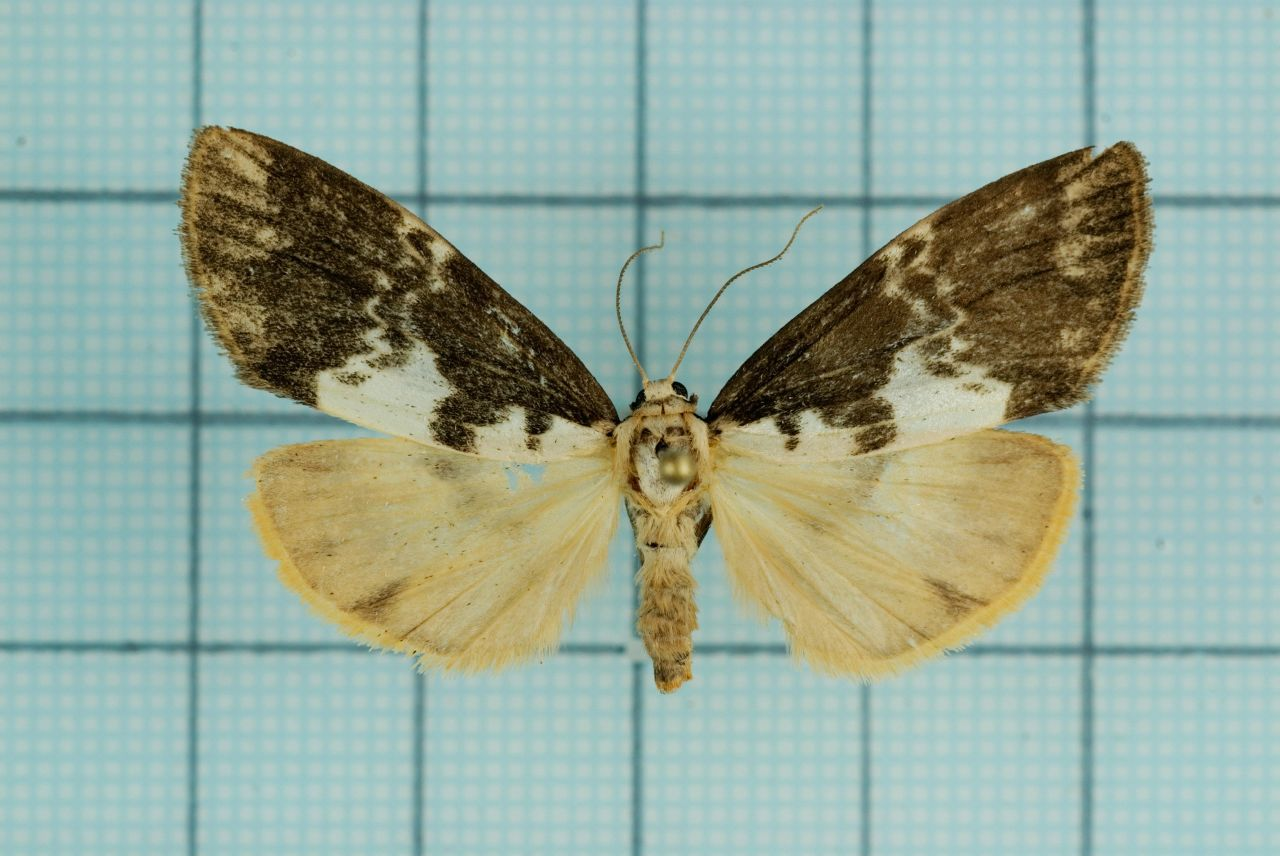

Scientific classification
- Kingdom: Animalia
- Phylum: Arthropoda
- Class: Insecta
- Order: Lepidoptera
- Superfamily: Noctuoidea
- Family: Erebidae
- Subfamily: Arctiinae
- Genus: Asura
- Species: A. albidorsalis

Binomial name
- Asura albidorsalis Wileman, 1914

Synonyms
- Barsine albidorsalis (Wileman, 1914)

= Asura albidorsalis =

Species of moth

Asura albidorsalis is a moth of the subfamily Arctiinae. The species was first described by Alfred Ernest Wileman in 1914. It is endemic to Taiwan.

The wingspan is about 35 mm.
