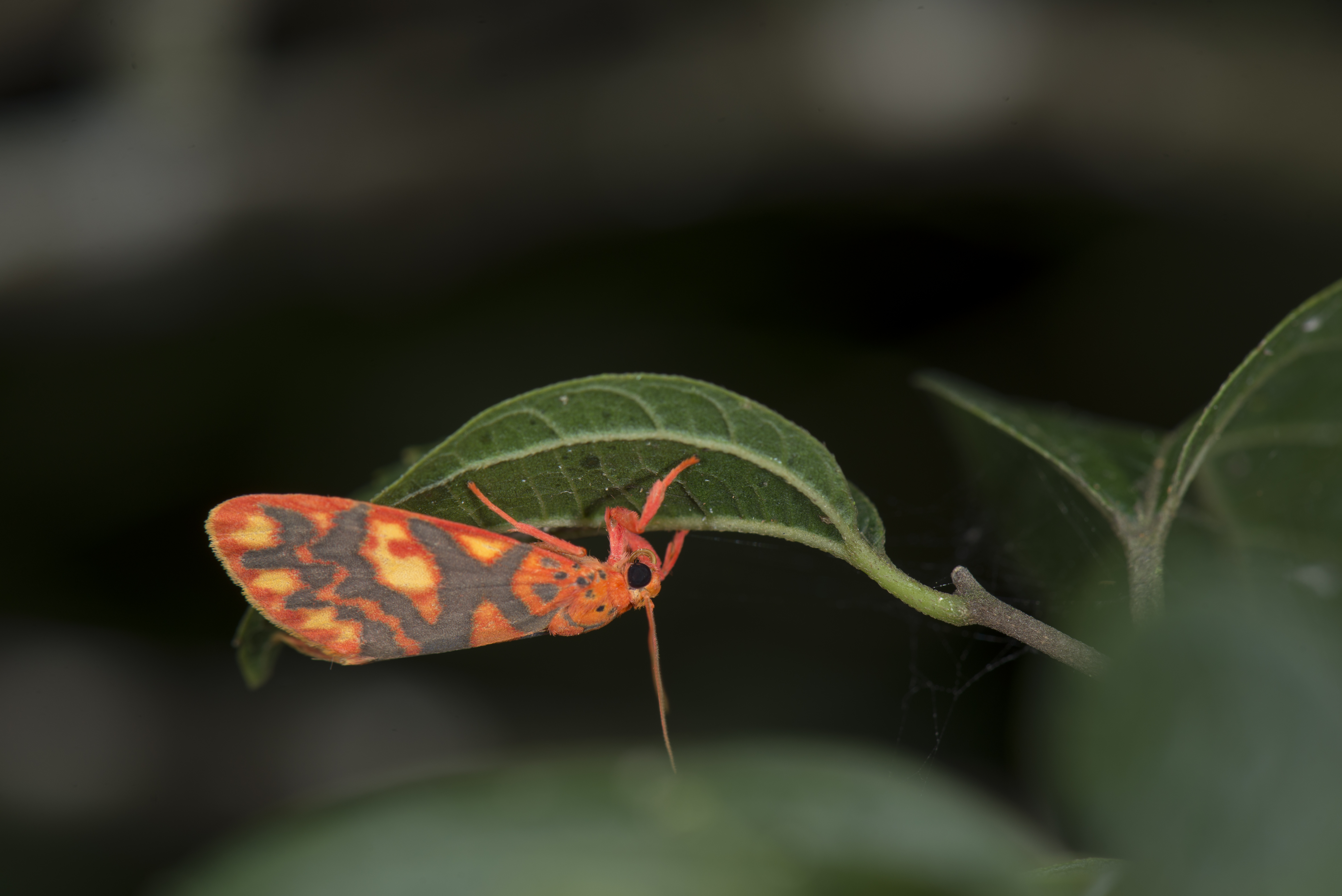

Scientific classification
- Domain: Eukaryota
- Kingdom: Animalia
- Phylum: Arthropoda
- Class: Insecta
- Order: Lepidoptera
- Superfamily: Noctuoidea
- Family: Erebidae
- Subfamily: Arctiinae
- Genus: Asura
- Species: A. tricolor

Binomial name
- Asura tricolor (Wileman, 1910)

Synonyms
- Miltochrista tricolor Wileman, 1910

= Asura tricolor =

Species of moth

Asura tricolor is a moth of the family Erebidae. It was described by Wileman in 1910. It is found in Taiwan and China.
