= Asura pinkurata =

Scientific classification
- Kingdom: Animalia
- Phylum: Arthropoda
- Class: Insecta
- Order: Lepidoptera
- Superfamily: Noctuoidea
- Family: Erebidae
- Subfamily: Arctiinae
- Genus: Asura
- Species: A. pinkurata

Binomial name
- Asura pinkurata Kühne, 2007

Species of moth

Asura pinkurata is a moth of the family Erebidae. It was described by Lars Kühne in 2007. It is found in Uganda.
