= Asura crocota =

Scientific classification
- Kingdom: Animalia
- Phylum: Arthropoda
- Class: Insecta
- Order: Lepidoptera
- Superfamily: Noctuoidea
- Family: Erebidae
- Subfamily: Arctiinae
- Genus: Asura
- Species: A. crocota

Binomial name
- Asura crocota Hampson, 1900

Synonyms
- Calligenia melitaula Meyrick, 1899

Species of moth

Asura crocota is a moth of the family Erebidae. It is found on the Louisiade Archipelago.
