= Asura bizonoides =

Scientific classification
- Kingdom: Animalia
- Phylum: Arthropoda
- Class: Insecta
- Order: Lepidoptera
- Superfamily: Noctuoidea
- Family: Erebidae
- Subfamily: Arctiinae
- Genus: Asura
- Species: A. bizonoides

Binomial name
- Asura bizonoides (Walker, 1862)

Synonyms
- Lyclene bizonoides Walker, 1862; Setina tabida Snellen, 1880; Asura tibada Hampson, 1900

Species of moth

Asura bizonoides is a moth of the family Erebidae. It is found on Sumatra.
