= Asura metamelas =

Scientific classification
- Kingdom: Animalia
- Phylum: Arthropoda
- Class: Insecta
- Order: Lepidoptera
- Superfamily: Noctuoidea
- Family: Erebidae
- Subfamily: Arctiinae
- Genus: Asura
- Species: A. metamelas

Binomial name
- Asura metamelas (Hampson, 1893)

Synonyms
- Lyclene metamelas Hampson, 1893; Asura postfusca Draudt, 1914

Species of moth

Asura metamelas is a moth of the family Erebidae. It is found in Sri Lanka.
