= Asura avernalis =

Scientific classification
- Domain: Eukaryota
- Kingdom: Animalia
- Phylum: Arthropoda
- Class: Insecta
- Order: Lepidoptera
- Superfamily: Noctuoidea
- Family: Erebidae
- Subfamily: Arctiinae
- Genus: Asura
- Species: A. avernalis

Binomial name
- Asura avernalis (Butler, 1887)

Synonyms
- Miltochrista avernalis Butler, 1887; Asura bougainvillei Rothschild, 1913; Asura floridensis Rothschild, 1913; Asura isabelina Rothschild, 1913

Species of moth

Asura avernalis is a moth of the family Erebidae. It is found on the Solomon Islands and Bougainville Island.
