= Asura discisigna =

Scientific classification
- Domain: Eukaryota
- Kingdom: Animalia
- Phylum: Arthropoda
- Class: Insecta
- Order: Lepidoptera
- Superfamily: Noctuoidea
- Family: Erebidae
- Subfamily: Arctiinae
- Genus: Asura
- Species: A. discisigna

Binomial name
- Asura discisigna (Moore, 1878)

Synonyms
- Setina discisigna Moore, 1878; Miltochrista fuscifusa Hampson, 1894; Barsine fuscifera Swinhoe, 1894; Miltochrista decisigna Hampson, 1894; Asura depuncta Draudt

Species of moth

Asura discisigna is a moth of the family Erebidae. It is found in India and on Borneo.
