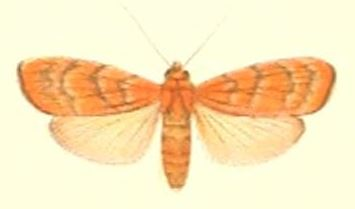
- Asura effulgens

Scientific classification
- Domain: Eukaryota
- Kingdom: Animalia
- Phylum: Arthropoda
- Class: Insecta
- Order: Lepidoptera
- Superfamily: Noctuoidea
- Family: Erebidae
- Subfamily: Arctiinae
- Genus: Asura
- Species: A. effulgens

Binomial name
- Asura effulgens (Pagenstecher, 1900)

Synonyms
- Miltochrista effulgens Pagenstecher, 1900

= Asura effulgens =

Species of moth

Asura effulgens is a moth of the subfamily Arctiinae. It is found in Papua New Guinea.
