= Asura mimetica =

Scientific classification
- Domain: Eukaryota
- Kingdom: Animalia
- Phylum: Arthropoda
- Class: Insecta
- Order: Lepidoptera
- Superfamily: Noctuoidea
- Family: Erebidae
- Subfamily: Arctiinae
- Genus: Asura
- Species: A. mimetica

Binomial name
- Asura mimetica Rothschild, 1913

Species of moth

Asura mimetica is a moth of the family Erebidae. It was described by Walter Rothschild 1913 and is found on the Solomon Islands.

== Subspecies ==
- Asura mimetica mimetica (Solomon Islands)
- Asura mimetica flagrans D. S. Fletcher, 1957 (Renell Island)
