= Asura metascota =

Scientific classification
- Kingdom: Animalia
- Phylum: Arthropoda
- Class: Insecta
- Order: Lepidoptera
- Superfamily: Noctuoidea
- Family: Erebidae
- Subfamily: Arctiinae
- Genus: Asura
- Species: A. metascota

Binomial name
- Asura metascota Hampson, 1905

Synonyms
- Asura analogus Rothschild, 1913; Asura bougainvillicola Strand, 1922; Asura feminina Rothschild, 1913; Asura suffusa Draudt, 1914

Species of moth

Asura metascota is a moth of the family Erebidae first described by George Hampson in 1905. It is found on the Solomon Islands.
