= Asura latimargo =

Scientific classification
- Domain: Eukaryota
- Kingdom: Animalia
- Phylum: Arthropoda
- Class: Insecta
- Order: Lepidoptera
- Superfamily: Noctuoidea
- Family: Erebidae
- Subfamily: Arctiinae
- Genus: Asura
- Species: A. latimargo

Binomial name
- Asura latimargo Roepke, 1946

Species of moth

Asura latimargo is a moth of the family Erebidae. It is found on Sulawesi.
