= Asura chrysomela =

Scientific classification
- Kingdom: Animalia
- Phylum: Arthropoda
- Class: Insecta
- Order: Lepidoptera
- Superfamily: Noctuoidea
- Family: Erebidae
- Subfamily: Arctiinae
- Genus: Asura
- Species: A. chrysomela

Binomial name
- Asura chrysomela Hampson, 1905

Synonyms
- Asura reducta Rothschild, 1913

Species of moth

Asura chrysomela is a moth of the family Erebidae first described by George Hampson in 1905. It is found on the Solomon Islands.
