= Asura cuneigera =

Scientific classification
- Kingdom: Animalia
- Phylum: Arthropoda
- Class: Insecta
- Order: Lepidoptera
- Superfamily: Noctuoidea
- Family: Erebidae
- Subfamily: Arctiinae
- Genus: Asura
- Species: A. cuneigera

Binomial name
- Asura cuneigera (Walker, 1862)

Synonyms
- Lyclene cuneigera Walker, 1862; Asura lutaroides van Eecke, 1926

Species of moth

Asura cuneigera is a moth of the family Erebidae. It is found on Borneo, Peninsular Malaysia, Sumatra and Bali.
