= Asura flavida =

Scientific classification
- Domain: Eukaryota
- Kingdom: Animalia
- Phylum: Arthropoda
- Class: Insecta
- Order: Lepidoptera
- Superfamily: Noctuoidea
- Family: Erebidae
- Subfamily: Arctiinae
- Genus: Asura
- Species: A. flavida

Binomial name
- Asura flavida (Butler, 1887)

Synonyms
- Miltochrista flavida Butler, 1887

Species of moth

Asura flavida is a moth of the family Erebidae. It is found on the Solomon Islands.
