= Asura ila =

Scientific classification
- Domain: Eukaryota
- Kingdom: Animalia
- Phylum: Arthropoda
- Class: Insecta
- Order: Lepidoptera
- Superfamily: Noctuoidea
- Family: Erebidae
- Subfamily: Arctiinae
- Genus: Asura
- Species: A. ila

Binomial name
- Asura ila (Moore, 1859)

Synonyms
- Lyclene ila Moore, 1859; Asura unifascia Rothschild, 1913

Species of moth

Asura ila is a moth of the family Erebidae. It is found in India and Sri Lanka.

== Description ==
Its wingspan is about 22 mm. Antennae of male ciliated. Sub-basal and postmedial bands of the forewings are reduced to a series of specks. Medial band is broad, regular and nearly erect. The marginal series of specks present.
