= Asura nubifascia =

Scientific classification
- Kingdom: Animalia
- Phylum: Arthropoda
- Class: Insecta
- Order: Lepidoptera
- Superfamily: Noctuoidea
- Family: Erebidae
- Subfamily: Arctiinae
- Genus: Asura
- Species: A. nubifascia

Binomial name
- Asura nubifascia (Walker, 1864)

Synonyms
- Barsine nubifascia Walker, 1864; Barsine punctifascia Walker, 1869

Species of moth

Asura nubifascia is a moth of the family Erebidae. It is found in the north-western Himalayas.
