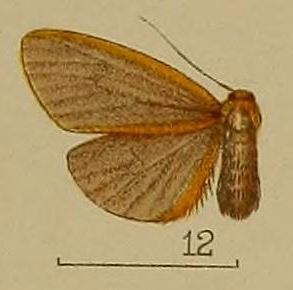

Scientific classification
- Kingdom: Animalia
- Phylum: Arthropoda
- Class: Insecta
- Order: Lepidoptera
- Superfamily: Noctuoidea
- Family: Erebidae
- Subfamily: Arctiinae
- Genus: Asura
- Species: A. fulvimarginata

Binomial name
- Asura fulvimarginata Hampson, 1904

= Asura fulvimarginata =

Species of moth

Asura fulvimarginata is a moth of the family Erebidae. It is found in India.
