= Asura gigantea =

Scientific classification
- Domain: Eukaryota
- Kingdom: Animalia
- Phylum: Arthropoda
- Class: Insecta
- Order: Lepidoptera
- Superfamily: Noctuoidea
- Family: Erebidae
- Subfamily: Arctiinae
- Genus: Asura
- Species: A. gigantea

Binomial name
- Asura gigantea Kühne, 2007

Synonyms
- Tumicla gigantea (Kühne, 2007)

Species of moth

Asura gigantea is a moth of the family Erebidae. It was described by Lars Kühne in 2007. It is found in Burundi.
