= Asura postbicolor =

Scientific classification
- Domain: Eukaryota
- Kingdom: Animalia
- Phylum: Arthropoda
- Class: Insecta
- Order: Lepidoptera
- Superfamily: Noctuoidea
- Family: Erebidae
- Subfamily: Arctiinae
- Genus: Asura
- Species: A. postbicolor

Binomial name
- Asura postbicolor Rothschild, 1913

Species of moth

Asura postbicolor is a moth of the family Erebidae first described by Walter Rothschild in 1913.
