= Asura reversa =

Scientific classification
- Domain: Eukaryota
- Kingdom: Animalia
- Phylum: Arthropoda
- Class: Insecta
- Order: Lepidoptera
- Superfamily: Noctuoidea
- Family: Erebidae
- Subfamily: Arctiinae
- Genus: Asura
- Species: A. reversa

Binomial name
- Asura reversa Rothschild, 1916

Synonyms
- Asura dampierensis Rothschild, 1916

Species of moth

Asura reversa is a moth of the family Erebidae. It is found on Admiralty Island and the Dampier Archipelago.
