= Asura intermedia =

Scientific classification
- Domain: Eukaryota
- Kingdom: Animalia
- Phylum: Arthropoda
- Class: Insecta
- Order: Lepidoptera
- Superfamily: Noctuoidea
- Family: Erebidae
- Subfamily: Arctiinae
- Genus: Asura
- Species: A. intermedia

Binomial name
- Asura intermedia Marumo, 1923

Species of moth

Asura intermedia is a moth of the family Erebidae. It is found in Japan.
