= Asura ocellata =

Scientific classification
- Domain: Eukaryota
- Kingdom: Animalia
- Phylum: Arthropoda
- Class: Insecta
- Order: Lepidoptera
- Superfamily: Noctuoidea
- Family: Erebidae
- Subfamily: Arctiinae
- Genus: Asura
- Species: A. ocellata

Binomial name
- Asura ocellata Wileman

Species of moth

Asura ocellata is a moth of the family Erebidae. It is found on the Philippines (Luzon).
