= Asura trizonata =

Scientific classification
- Domain: Eukaryota
- Kingdom: Animalia
- Phylum: Arthropoda
- Class: Insecta
- Order: Lepidoptera
- Superfamily: Noctuoidea
- Family: Erebidae
- Subfamily: Arctiinae
- Genus: Asura
- Species: A. trizonata

Binomial name
- Asura trizonata Rothschild, 1913

Species of moth

Asura trizonata is a moth of the family Erebidae. The type location is the Kai Islands of Indonesia.
