= Asura parallina =

Scientific classification
- Kingdom: Animalia
- Phylum: Arthropoda
- Class: Insecta
- Order: Lepidoptera
- Superfamily: Noctuoidea
- Family: Erebidae
- Subfamily: Arctiinae
- Genus: Asura
- Species: A. parallina

Binomial name
- Asura parallina (Hampson, 1894)

Synonyms
- Miltochrista parallina Hampson, 1894

Species of moth

Asura parallina is a moth of the family Erebidae. It is found in Burma.
