= Asura humilis =

Scientific classification
- Kingdom: Animalia
- Phylum: Arthropoda
- Class: Insecta
- Order: Lepidoptera
- Superfamily: Noctuoidea
- Family: Erebidae
- Subfamily: Arctiinae
- Genus: Asura
- Species: A. humilis

Binomial name
- Asura humilis (Walker, 1854)

Synonyms
- Cyllene humilis Walker, 1854; Lyclene semicirculata Heylaerts, 1891

Species of moth

Asura humilis is a moth of the family Erebidae. It is found in India, Burma and on Java.
