= Asura coccineoflammens =

Scientific classification
- Domain: Eukaryota
- Kingdom: Animalia
- Phylum: Arthropoda
- Class: Insecta
- Order: Lepidoptera
- Superfamily: Noctuoidea
- Family: Erebidae
- Subfamily: Arctiinae
- Genus: Asura
- Species: A. coccineoflammens

Binomial name
- Asura coccineoflammens Rothschild, 1913

Synonyms
- Asura coccineoflammea Hampson, 1914

Species of moth

Asura coccineoflammens is a moth of the family Erebidae. It is found in New Guinea.
