= Asura solita =

Scientific classification
- Kingdom: Animalia
- Phylum: Arthropoda
- Class: Insecta
- Order: Lepidoptera
- Superfamily: Noctuoidea
- Family: Erebidae
- Subfamily: Arctiinae
- Genus: Asura
- Species: A. solita

Binomial name
- Asura solita (Walker, 1854)

Synonyms
- Setina solita Walker, 1854; Setina solita ab. punctilinea Moore, 1878

Species of moth

Asura solita is a moth of the family Erebidae. It is found in Sri Lanka.

== Description ==
The wingspan is 24 mm in the male and 26 mm in the female. Antennae of male ciliated. In male, medial band of both wings is obsolete. Forewings in male with the medial and postmedial series of specks almost entirely obsolete. The markings are well-marked in female.
