= Asura elegans =

Scientific classification
- Domain: Eukaryota
- Kingdom: Animalia
- Phylum: Arthropoda
- Class: Insecta
- Order: Lepidoptera
- Superfamily: Noctuoidea
- Family: Erebidae
- Subfamily: Arctiinae
- Genus: Asura
- Species: A. elegans

Binomial name
- Asura elegans Reich, 1937

Synonyms
- Paraheliosia elegans (Reich, 1937)

Species of moth

Asura elegans is a moth of the family Erebidae first described by Reich in 1937.
