= Asura melanopyga =

Scientific classification
- Kingdom: Animalia
- Phylum: Arthropoda
- Class: Insecta
- Order: Lepidoptera
- Superfamily: Noctuoidea
- Family: Erebidae
- Subfamily: Arctiinae
- Genus: Asura
- Species: A. melanopyga

Binomial name
- Asura melanopyga Hampson, 1918

Synonyms
- Asura inornata Wileman

Species of moth

Asura melanopyga is a moth of the family Erebidae. It is found in Taiwan.
