= Asura sexpuncta =

Scientific classification
- Kingdom: Animalia
- Phylum: Arthropoda
- Class: Insecta
- Order: Lepidoptera
- Superfamily: Noctuoidea
- Family: Erebidae
- Subfamily: Arctiinae
- Genus: Asura
- Species: A. sexpuncta

Binomial name
- Asura sexpuncta (Hampson, 1894)

Synonyms
- Miltochrista sexpuncta Hampson, 1894

Species of moth

Asura sexpuncta is a moth of the family Erebidae. It is found in Myanmar.
