= Asura amabilis =

Scientific classification
- Domain: Eukaryota
- Kingdom: Animalia
- Phylum: Arthropoda
- Class: Insecta
- Order: Lepidoptera
- Superfamily: Noctuoidea
- Family: Erebidae
- Subfamily: Arctiinae
- Genus: Asura
- Species: A. amabilis

Binomial name
- Asura amabilis Rothschild & Jordan, 1901

Species of moth

Asura amabilis is a moth of the family Erebidae. It is found on the Solomon Islands.
