= Asura subcruciata =

Scientific classification
- Domain: Eukaryota
- Kingdom: Animalia
- Phylum: Arthropoda
- Class: Insecta
- Order: Lepidoptera
- Superfamily: Noctuoidea
- Family: Erebidae
- Subfamily: Arctiinae
- Genus: Asura
- Species: A. subcruciata

Binomial name
- Asura subcruciata Rothschild, 1913

Synonyms
- Barsine_auctorum porphyrea Snellen, 1880

Species of moth

Asura subcruciata is a moth of the family Erebidae.
