= Asura ecmelaena =

Scientific classification
- Kingdom: Animalia
- Phylum: Arthropoda
- Class: Insecta
- Order: Lepidoptera
- Superfamily: Noctuoidea
- Family: Erebidae
- Subfamily: Arctiinae
- Genus: Asura
- Species: A. ecmelaena

Binomial name
- Asura ecmelaena Hampson, 1900

Species of moth

Asura ecmelaena is a moth of the family Erebidae first described by George Hampson in 1900. It is found in Sangihe Islands of Indonesia.
