= Asura camerunensis =

Scientific classification
- Kingdom: Animalia
- Phylum: Arthropoda
- Class: Insecta
- Order: Lepidoptera
- Superfamily: Noctuoidea
- Family: Erebidae
- Subfamily: Arctiinae
- Genus: Asura
- Species: A. camerunensis

Binomial name
- Asura camerunensis Strand, 1912

Species of moth

Asura camerunensis is a moth of the subfamily Arctiinae. It is found in Cameroon.
