= Asura infumata =

Scientific classification
- Domain: Eukaryota
- Kingdom: Animalia
- Phylum: Arthropoda
- Class: Insecta
- Order: Lepidoptera
- Superfamily: Noctuoidea
- Family: Erebidae
- Subfamily: Arctiinae
- Genus: Asura
- Species: A. infumata

Binomial name
- Asura infumata (Felder, 1874)

Synonyms
- Settinochroa infumata Felder, 1874; Settinochroa pallida Moore, 1878; Settinochroa postica Moore, 1878

Species of moth

Asura infumata is a moth of the family Erebidae. It is found in the north-western Himalayas.
