= Asura peloa =

Scientific classification
- Domain: Eukaryota
- Kingdom: Animalia
- Phylum: Arthropoda
- Class: Insecta
- Order: Lepidoptera
- Superfamily: Noctuoidea
- Family: Erebidae
- Subfamily: Arctiinae
- Genus: Asura
- Species: A. peloa

Binomial name
- Asura peloa (C. Swinhoe, 1904)

Synonyms
- Lyclene peloa C. Swinhoe, 1904

Species of moth

Asura peloa is a moth of the family Erebidae first described by Charles Swinhoe in 1904. It is found on Sumatra, Peninsular Malaysia, Java and Borneo.
