= Asura cuneifera =

Scientific classification
- Kingdom: Animalia
- Phylum: Arthropoda
- Class: Insecta
- Order: Lepidoptera
- Superfamily: Noctuoidea
- Family: Erebidae
- Subfamily: Arctiinae
- Genus: Asura
- Species: A. cuneifera

Binomial name
- Asura cuneifera (Walker, 1862)

Synonyms
- Lyclene cuneifera Walker, 1862

Species of moth

Asura cuneifera is a moth of the family Erebidae. It is found on Java, Borneo, Peninsular Malaysia and Sumatra. The habitat consists of various lowland forest types, including heath forests and lower montane forests.
