= Asura asaphes =

Scientific classification
- Kingdom: Animalia
- Phylum: Arthropoda
- Class: Insecta
- Order: Lepidoptera
- Superfamily: Noctuoidea
- Family: Erebidae
- Subfamily: Arctiinae
- Genus: Asura
- Species: A. asaphes

Binomial name
- Asura asaphes Hampson, 1900

Synonyms
- “Lyclene” asaphes

Species of moth

Asura asaphes is a moth of the family Erebidae. It is found on Borneo, Java, Peninsular Malaysia and Sumatra. The habitat consists of lowland dipterocarp forests.
