= Asura zebrina =

Scientific classification
- Kingdom: Animalia
- Phylum: Arthropoda
- Class: Insecta
- Order: Lepidoptera
- Superfamily: Noctuoidea
- Family: Erebidae
- Subfamily: Arctiinae
- Genus: Asura
- Species: A. zebrina

Binomial name
- Asura zebrina (Hampson, 1914)

Synonyms
- Trichocerosia zebrina Hampson, 1914; Chiretolpis zebrina

Species of moth

Asura zebrina is a moth of the family Erebidae first described by George Hampson in 1914. It is found in New South Wales, Australia.
