= Asura horishanella =

Scientific classification
- Kingdom: Animalia
- Phylum: Arthropoda
- Clade: Pancrustacea
- Class: Insecta
- Order: Lepidoptera
- Superfamily: Noctuoidea
- Family: Erebidae
- Subfamily: Arctiinae
- Genus: Asura
- Species: A. horishanella

Binomial name
- Asura horishanella Matsumura, 1927

Species of moth

Asura horishanella is a moth of the family Erebidae. It is found in Taiwan.
