= Asura obsoleta =

Scientific classification
- Domain: Eukaryota
- Kingdom: Animalia
- Phylum: Arthropoda
- Class: Insecta
- Order: Lepidoptera
- Superfamily: Noctuoidea
- Family: Erebidae
- Subfamily: Arctiinae
- Genus: Asura
- Species: A. obsoleta

Binomial name
- Asura obsoleta (Moore, 1878)

Synonyms
- Lyclene obsoleta Moore, 1878; Lyclene assamica Moore, 1878

Species of moth

Asura obsoleta is a moth of the family Erebidae first described by Frederic Moore in 1878. It is found in the Indian state of Sikkim and Borneo.

The forewings are lighter yellow, with a zigzag postmedial line.
