= Asura anomala =

Scientific classification
- Domain: Eukaryota
- Kingdom: Animalia
- Phylum: Arthropoda
- Class: Insecta
- Order: Lepidoptera
- Superfamily: Noctuoidea
- Family: Erebidae
- Subfamily: Arctiinae
- Genus: Asura
- Species: A. anomala

Binomial name
- Asura anomala (Elwes, 1890)

Synonyms
- Lithosia anomala Elwes, 1890

Species of moth

Asura anomala is a moth of the family Erebidae. It is found in India.
