= Asura ruptifascia =

Scientific classification
- Kingdom: Animalia
- Phylum: Arthropoda
- Class: Insecta
- Order: Lepidoptera
- Superfamily: Noctuoidea
- Family: Erebidae
- Subfamily: Arctiinae
- Genus: Asura
- Species: A. ruptifascia

Binomial name
- Asura ruptifascia (Hampson, 1893)

Synonyms
- Lyclene ruptifascia Hampson, 1893

Species of moth

Asura ruptifascia is a moth of the family Erebidae. It is found in India and Sri Lanka.

== Description ==
The species' wingspan is about 18 mm. Antennae of male ciliated. Body pure ochreous. Sub-basal band of forewings outwardly oblique towards inner margin and anastomosing (fusing) with the medial band. Upper portion of the postmedial band reduced to a speck series. Hindwings with a well defined fuscous band.
