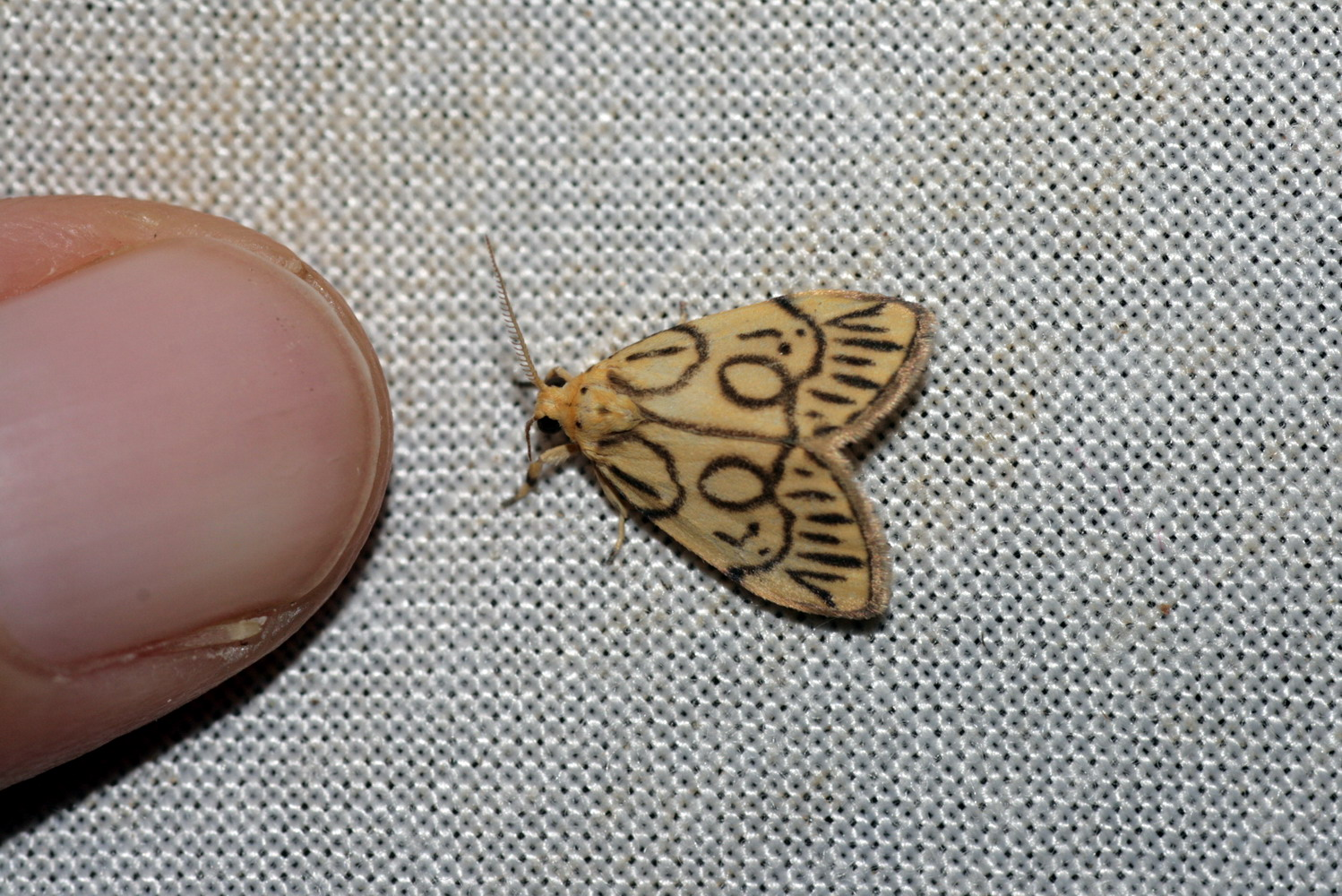

Scientific classification
- Kingdom: Animalia
- Phylum: Arthropoda
- Class: Insecta
- Order: Lepidoptera
- Superfamily: Noctuoidea
- Family: Erebidae
- Subfamily: Arctiinae
- Genus: Asura
- Species: A. synestramena

Binomial name
- Asura synestramena Hampson, 1900

Synonyms
- Lyclene synestramena

= Asura synestramena =

Species of moth

Asura synestramena is a species of lichen moths of the family Erebidae, subfamily Arctiinae. It is found on Borneo and Bali. The habitat consists of lowland forests.

The species has an ovate marking with an eyebrow shape in the medial zone.
