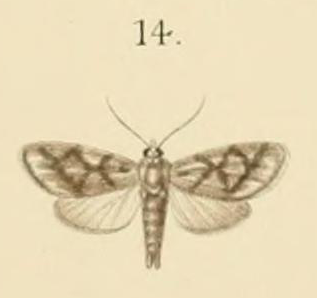
- A. chrypsilon ♂ from Luzon.

Scientific classification
- Domain: Eukaryota
- Kingdom: Animalia
- Phylum: Arthropoda
- Class: Insecta
- Order: Lepidoptera
- Superfamily: Noctuoidea
- Family: Erebidae
- Subfamily: Arctiinae
- Genus: Asura
- Species: A. chrypsilon

Binomial name
- Asura chrypsilon (Semper, 1899)

Synonyms
- Miltochrista chrypsilon Semper, 1899

= Asura chrypsilon =

Species of moth

Asura chrypsilon is a moth of the family Erebidae. It is found on the Philippines.
