= Asura biplagiata =

Scientific classification
- Domain: Eukaryota
- Kingdom: Animalia
- Phylum: Arthropoda
- Class: Insecta
- Order: Lepidoptera
- Superfamily: Noctuoidea
- Family: Erebidae
- Subfamily: Arctiinae
- Genus: Asura
- Species: A. biplagiata

Binomial name
- Asura biplagiata (Rothschild, 1913)

Synonyms
- Miltochrista biplagiata Rothschild, 1913

Species of moth

Asura biplagiata is a moth of the family Erebidae. It is found in New Guinea.
