= Asura melanoxantha =

Scientific classification
- Kingdom: Animalia
- Phylum: Arthropoda
- Class: Insecta
- Order: Lepidoptera
- Superfamily: Noctuoidea
- Family: Erebidae
- Subfamily: Arctiinae
- Genus: Asura
- Species: A. melanoxantha

Binomial name
- Asura melanoxantha Hampson, 1914

Species of moth

Asura melanoxantha is a moth of the family Erebidae. It is found in New Guinea.
