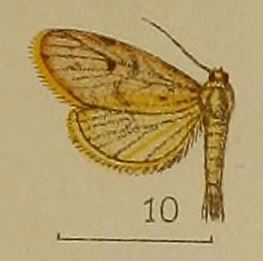
- ""Asura phantasma""

Scientific classification
- Kingdom: Animalia
- Phylum: Arthropoda
- Class: Insecta
- Order: Lepidoptera
- Superfamily: Noctuoidea
- Family: Erebidae
- Subfamily: Arctiinae
- Genus: Asura
- Species: A. phantasma

Binomial name
- Asura phantasma Hampson, 1907

= Asura phantasma =

Species of moth

Asura phantasma is a moth of the family Erebidae that is found in India.
