= Asura semifascia =

Scientific classification
- Kingdom: Animalia
- Phylum: Arthropoda
- Clade: Pancrustacea
- Class: Insecta
- Order: Lepidoptera
- Superfamily: Noctuoidea
- Family: Erebidae
- Subfamily: Arctiinae
- Genus: Asura
- Species: A. semifascia

Binomial name
- Asura semifascia (Walker, 1854)

Synonyms
- Setina semifascia Walker, 1854; Setina semifascia ab. obsolescens Draudt, 1914; Lyclene semifascia (Walker, 1854)

Species of moth

Asura semifascia is a species of moth of the family Erebidae. It is found in Sri Lanka and Myanmar.

== Description ==
The wingspan of the male is 20 mm and the female 26 mm. Forewings with broad cell. Antennae of male ciliated. Forewings with an irregular and highly dentate postmedial line present. Ground colour ochreous. Antemedial and medial lines of forewings reduced to a series of spots. Marginal speck series absent. Disk is often suffused with fuscous. Larva thickly clothed with short closely situated black hairs, which open out at the joints when it rolls itself into a ball.
