= Asura marginata =

Scientific classification
- Kingdom: Animalia
- Phylum: Arthropoda
- Class: Insecta
- Order: Lepidoptera
- Superfamily: Noctuoidea
- Family: Erebidae
- Subfamily: Arctiinae
- Genus: Asura
- Species: A. marginata

Binomial name
- Asura marginata (Walker, 1864)

Synonyms
- Nudaria marginata Walker, 1864

Species of moth

Asura marginata is a moth of the family Erebidae. It is found in India.
