= Asura umbrosa =

Scientific classification
- Kingdom: Animalia
- Phylum: Arthropoda
- Class: Insecta
- Order: Lepidoptera
- Superfamily: Noctuoidea
- Family: Erebidae
- Subfamily: Arctiinae
- Genus: Asura
- Species: A. umbrosa

Binomial name
- Asura umbrosa (Hampson, 1896)

Synonyms
- Miltochrista umbrosa Hampson, 1896; Barsine umbrosa (Hampson, 1896}

Species of moth

Asura umbrosa is a moth of the family Erebidae first described by George Hampson in 1896. It is found in Assam, India.
