= Asura varians =

Scientific classification
- Kingdom: Animalia
- Phylum: Arthropoda
- Class: Insecta
- Order: Lepidoptera
- Superfamily: Noctuoidea
- Family: Erebidae
- Subfamily: Arctiinae
- Genus: Asura
- Species: A. varians

Binomial name
- Asura varians (Hampson, 1893)

Synonyms
- Lyclene varians Hampson, 1893

Species of moth

Asura varians is a moth of the family Erebidae. It is found in Sri Lanka.

== Description ==
The wingspan is 20 mm. Antennae of male ciliated. In male, head and thorax orange in color, where black spots present on thorax. Abdomen and wings are black. Forewings with a slight bronze tinge with a black speck at end of cell. Some species has basal orange spot, medial costal spots and inner marginal spots on forewings with an orange streaked apex. Female has anal ochreous tuft. Forewings consist orange base, two costal spots and one inner marginal spot. Outer margin is orange as in male, but with a series of black specks.
