= Cyme aroa =

Scientific classification
- Domain: Eukaryota
- Kingdom: Animalia
- Phylum: Arthropoda
- Class: Insecta
- Order: Lepidoptera
- Superfamily: Noctuoidea
- Family: Erebidae
- Subfamily: Arctiinae
- Genus: Cyme
- Species: C. aroa

Binomial name
- Cyme aroa (Bethune-Baker, 1904)

Synonyms
- Asura aroa Bethune-Baker, 1904

Species of moth

Cyme aroa is a moth of the family Erebidae. It is found in New Guinea.
