= Cyme citronopuncta =

Scientific classification
- Domain: Eukaryota
- Kingdom: Animalia
- Phylum: Arthropoda
- Class: Insecta
- Order: Lepidoptera
- Superfamily: Noctuoidea
- Family: Erebidae
- Subfamily: Arctiinae
- Tribe: Lithosiini
- Subtribe: Nudariina
- Genus: Cyme
- Species: C. citronopuncta

Binomial name
- Cyme citronopuncta Rothschild, 1913

Synonyms
- Asura citronopuncta Rothschild, 1913; Asura citrinopuncta Hampson, 1914

Species of moth

Cyme citronopuncta is a moth of the subfamily Arctiinae. It is found in New Guinea.
