= Cyme phryctopa =

Scientific classification
- Kingdom: Animalia
- Phylum: Arthropoda
- Class: Insecta
- Order: Lepidoptera
- Superfamily: Noctuoidea
- Family: Erebidae
- Subfamily: Arctiinae
- Genus: Cyme
- Species: C. phryctopa

Binomial name
- Cyme phryctopa (Meyrick, 1889)

Synonyms
- Calligenia phryctopa Meyrick, 1889; Asura phryctopa; Ammatho phryctops Kirby, 1892

Species of moth

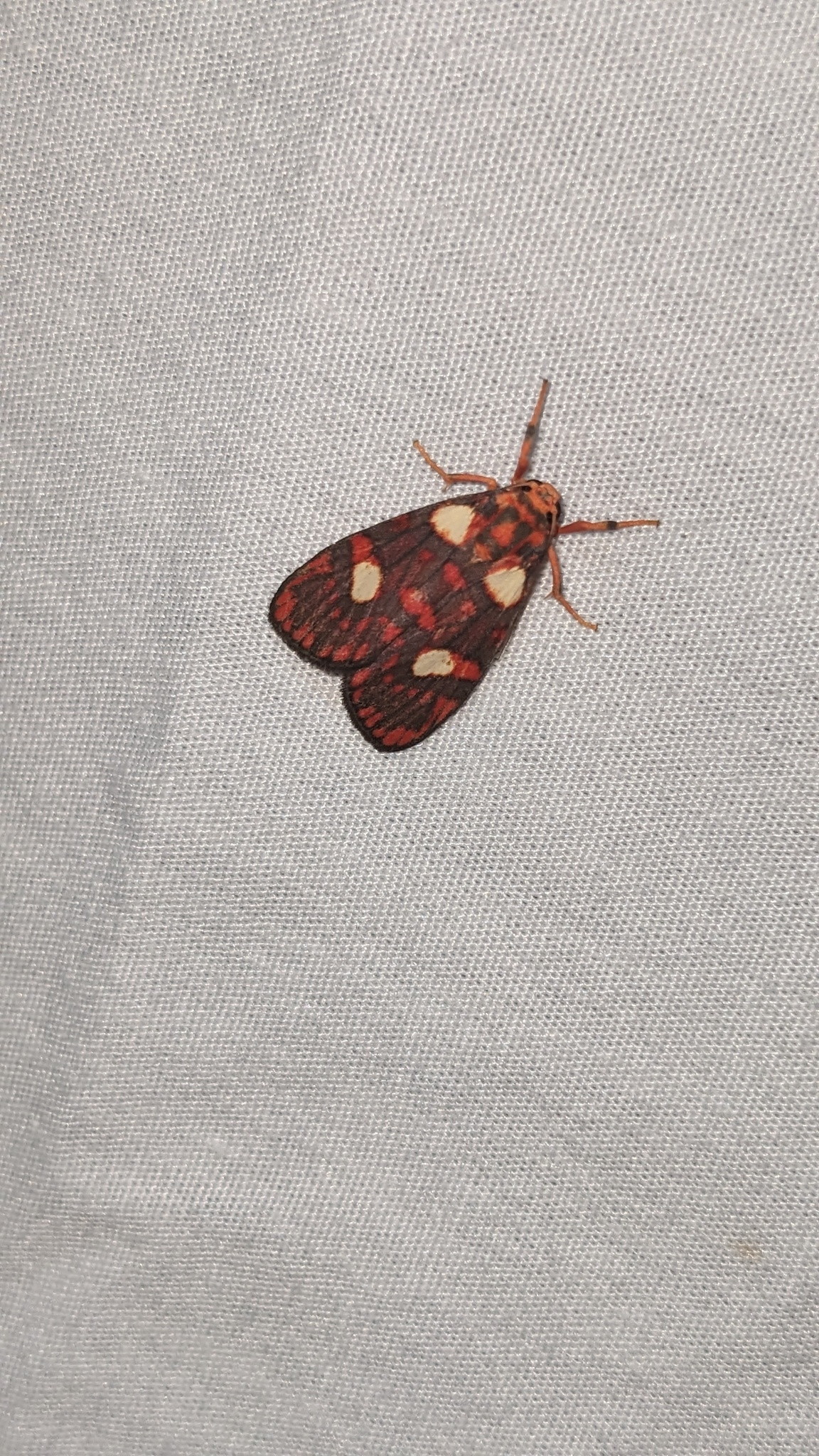
Cyme phryctopa, Papua Niugini

Cyme phryctopa is a moth of the family Erebidae. It is found in New Guinea.
