= Ghoria dirhabdus =

Scientific classification
- Domain: Eukaryota
- Kingdom: Animalia
- Phylum: Arthropoda
- Class: Insecta
- Order: Lepidoptera
- Superfamily: Noctuoidea
- Family: Erebidae
- Subfamily: Arctiinae
- Genus: Ghoria
- Species: G. dirhabdus

Binomial name
- Ghoria dirhabdus (Rothschild, 1916)

Synonyms
- Asura dirhabdus Rothschild, 1916; Asura postfasciatus Rothschild, 1920

Species of moth

Ghoria dirhabdus is a moth of the family Erebidae. It was described by Walter Rothschild in 1916. It is found on Sumatra and the Dampier Archipelago off the north-western coast of Australia.
