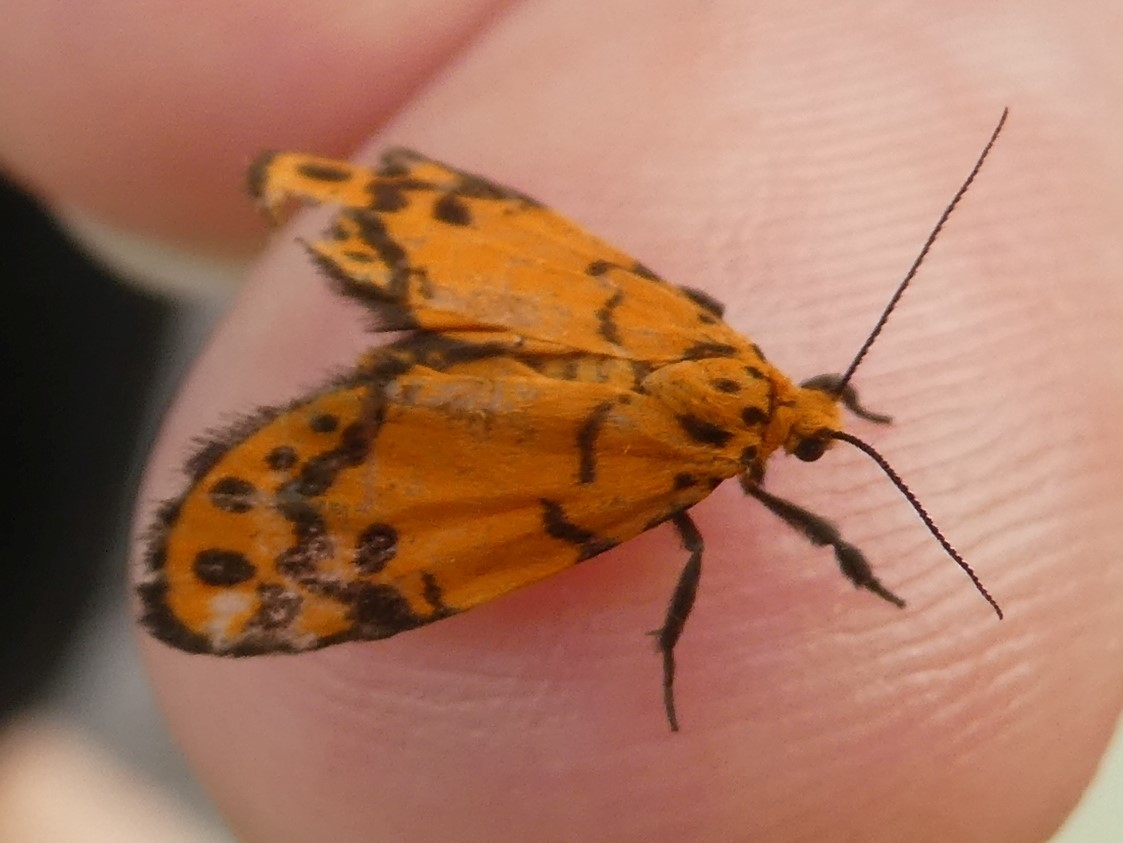

Scientific classification
- Domain: Eukaryota
- Kingdom: Animalia
- Phylum: Arthropoda
- Class: Insecta
- Order: Lepidoptera
- Superfamily: Noctuoidea
- Family: Erebidae
- Subfamily: Arctiinae
- Genus: Trichocerosia
- Species: T. variabilis

Binomial name
- Trichocerosia variabilis (Rothschild, 1901)

Synonyms
- Zygaenosia variabilis Rothschild, 1901; Asura variabilis; Chiretolpis variabilis; Asura antemedialis Strand, 1922; Asura discoidalis Strand, 1922

= Trichocerosia variabilis =

Species of moth

Trichocerosia variabilis is a species of moth in the subfamily Arctiinae. It was first described by Rothschild in 1901 and is found in Papua New Guinea.
