= Gymnasura rhodina =

Scientific classification
- Domain: Eukaryota
- Kingdom: Animalia
- Phylum: Arthropoda
- Class: Insecta
- Order: Lepidoptera
- Superfamily: Noctuoidea
- Family: Erebidae
- Subfamily: Arctiinae
- Genus: Gymnasura
- Species: G. rhodina

Binomial name
- Gymnasura rhodina (Rothschild & Jordan, 1905)

Synonyms
- Asura rhodina Rothschild & Jordan, 1905; Asura bella Bethune-Baker

Species of moth

Gymnasura rhodina is a moth of the subfamily Arctiinae. It was described by Rothschild and Jordan in 1905. It is found in New Guinea.
