= Nanarsine senara =

Scientific classification
- Domain: Eukaryota
- Kingdom: Animalia
- Phylum: Arthropoda
- Class: Insecta
- Order: Lepidoptera
- Superfamily: Noctuoidea
- Family: Erebidae
- Subfamily: Arctiinae
- Genus: Nanarsine
- Species: N. senara

Binomial name
- Nanarsine senara (Moore, 1859)

Synonyms
- Barsine senara Moore, 1859; Hypocrita porphyrea Snellen, 1880; Miltochrista sullia Swinhoe, 1901

Species of moth

Nanarsine senara is a species of moth of the family Erebidae, subfamily Arctiinae. It is found on Java and Borneo.
