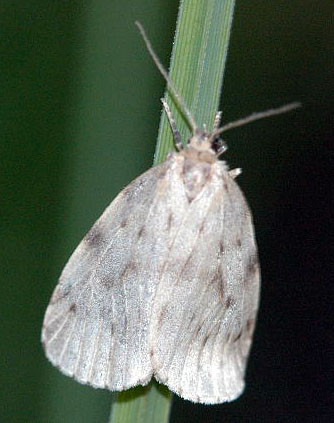
- Nudaria mundana

Scientific classification
- Kingdom: Animalia
- Phylum: Arthropoda
- Clade: Pancrustacea
- Class: Insecta
- Order: Lepidoptera
- Superfamily: Noctuoidea
- Family: Erebidae
- Subfamily: Arctiinae
- Tribe: Lithosiini
- Subtribe: Nudariina; Börner, 1920

= Nudariina =

Subtribe of moths

Nudariina is a subtribe of lichen moths in the family Erebidae. The taxon was described by Carl Julius Bernhard Börner in 1920.

== Taxonomy ==
The subtribe used to be classified as the tribe Nudariini of the subfamily Lithosiinae of the family Arctiidae.

== Genera ==
The following genera are included in the subtribe.

- Aberrasine
- Acco
- Adites
- Afrasura
- Albarrania
- Ammathella
- Ammatho
- Amphisine
- Apaidia
- Arctelene
- Argentosine
- Asparus
- Asura
- Asuridia
- Barsaurea
- Barsilene
- Barsine
- Barsochrista
- Barsura
- Boadicea
- Cabarda
- Cabardites
- Callidarsine
- Caprimimodes
- Caulocera
- Celamodes
- Cernysura
- Chamaita
- Chiretolpis
- Chrysallactis
- Chrysasura
- Cincinasura
- Composine
- Conicornuta
- Crocodeta
- Cyana
- Cyclomilta
- Cyme
- Darantasia
- Delineatia
- Disparsine
- Eriomastyx
- Esmasura
- Eucyclopera
- Fangclia
- Floridasura
- Fossia
- Graptasura
- Hampsonascia
- Huangilene
- Idopterum
- Indiania
- Integrivalvia
- Karolia
- Lambulosia
- Longarista
- Longarsine
- Matsumursine
- Micrarsine
- Micronyctemera
- Miltochrista
- Moorasura
- Nanarsine
- Neasura
- Nebulene
- Nepita
- Niveutane
- Nudaria
- Nudariphleps
- Opsaroa
- Ovipennis
- Padenodes
- Paidia
- Paradohertya
- Paraheliosia
- Parvuspina
- Paurophleps
- Pseudobarsine
- Pseudomiltochrista
- Quadrasura
- Rubrindiania
- Sarbine
- Schistophleps
- Sesapa
- Stigmatophora
- Striatella
- Teinomastyx
- Thermograpta
- Thumatha
- Trichocerosia
- Tumicla
- Wittasura
- Xanthetis
