= Macadumosia =

Scientific classification
- Kingdom: Animalia
- Phylum: Arthropoda
- Class: Insecta
- Order: Lepidoptera
- Superfamily: Noctuoidea
- Family: Erebidae
- Subfamily: Arctiinae
- Subtribe: Nudariina
- Genus: Macadumosia; Hampson, 1914
- Species: M. excisa

Binomial name
- Macadumosia excisa (Rothschild, 1912)

Synonyms
- Garudinia excisa Rothschild, 1912

Genus of moths

Macadumosia is a monotypic moth genus in the family Erebidae erected by George Hampson in 1914. Its single species, Macadumosia excisa, was first described by Walter Rothschild in 1912. It is found in Papua New Guinea.
