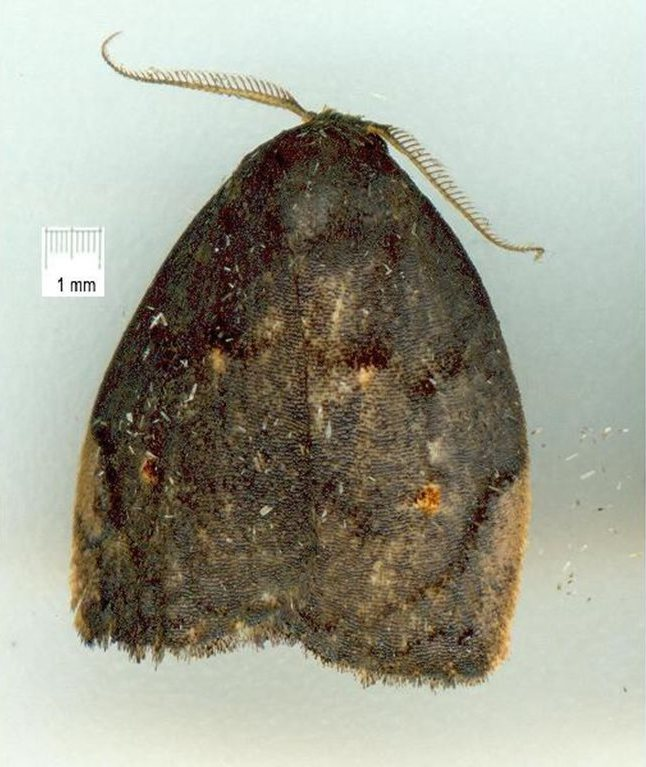
- Hemonia micrommata

Scientific classification
- Kingdom: Animalia
- Phylum: Arthropoda
- Class: Insecta
- Order: Lepidoptera
- Superfamily: Noctuoidea
- Family: Erebidae
- Subfamily: Arctiinae
- Subtribe: Nudariina
- Genus: Hemonia; Walker, 1863

Synonyms
- Eurodes Turner, 1899

= Hemonia =

Genus of moths

Hemonia is a genus of moths in the family Erebidae first described by Francis Walker in 1863. They are found only in Sri Lanka and Borneo.

== Description ==
Palpi slight and porrect (extending forward). Antennae ciliated in male. Forewings very broad and rounded. Vein 3 from before angle of cell, veins 4, 5 and 6, 7 stalked. Veins 8 to 11 nearly erect where vein 11 anastomosing (fusing) with vein 12. Hindwing with veins 4 and 5 stalked, vein 3 absent, vein 6 and 7 stalked and vein 8 from near end of cell.

== Species ==
- Hemonia micrommata Turner, 1899
- Hemonia monochroa Hampson, 1914
- Hemonia murina Rothschild, 1913
- Hemonia orbiferana Walker, 1863
- Hemonia pallida Hampson, 1914
- Hemonia rotundata Snellen, 1879
- Hemonia schistacea Rothschild, 1913
- Hemonia schistaceoalba Rothschild, 1913
- Hemonia simillima Rothschild, 1913
