= Sesapa sanguinea =

Scientific classification
- Kingdom: Animalia
- Phylum: Arthropoda
- Class: Insecta
- Order: Lepidoptera
- Superfamily: Noctuoidea
- Family: Erebidae
- Subfamily: Arctiinae
- Tribe: Lithosiini
- Subtribe: Nudariina
- Genus: Sesapa
- Species: S. sanguinea

Binomial name
- Sesapa sanguinea (Moore, 1877)

Synonyms
- Miltochrista sanguinea (Moore, 1877)

Species of moth

Sesapa sanguinea is a species in the moth family Erebidae, found in eastern China.
