= Sesapa inscripta =

Scientific classification
- Kingdom: Animalia
- Phylum: Arthropoda
- Class: Insecta
- Order: Lepidoptera
- Superfamily: Noctuoidea
- Family: Erebidae
- Subfamily: Arctiinae
- Tribe: Lithosiini
- Subtribe: Nudariina
- Genus: Sesapa
- Species: S. inscripta

Binomial name
- Sesapa inscripta Walker, 1854

Synonyms
- Miltochrista inscripta (Walker, 1854); Sesapa erubescens Butler, 1877

Species of moth

Sesapa inscripta is a species of moth in the family Erebidae. It is found in eastern China.
