= Indiania eccentropis =

Scientific classification
- Kingdom: Animalia
- Phylum: Arthropoda
- Class: Insecta
- Order: Lepidoptera
- Superfamily: Noctuoidea
- Family: Erebidae
- Subfamily: Arctiinae
- Tribe: Lithosiini
- Subtribe: Nudariina
- Genus: Indiania
- Species: I. eccentropis

Binomial name
- Indiania eccentropis (Meyrick, 1894)

Synonyms
- Miltochrista eccentropis Meyrick, 1894

Species of moth

Indiania eccentropis is a species of lichen moth in the family Erebidae. It is found in the Indian state of Assam, and Myanmar.
