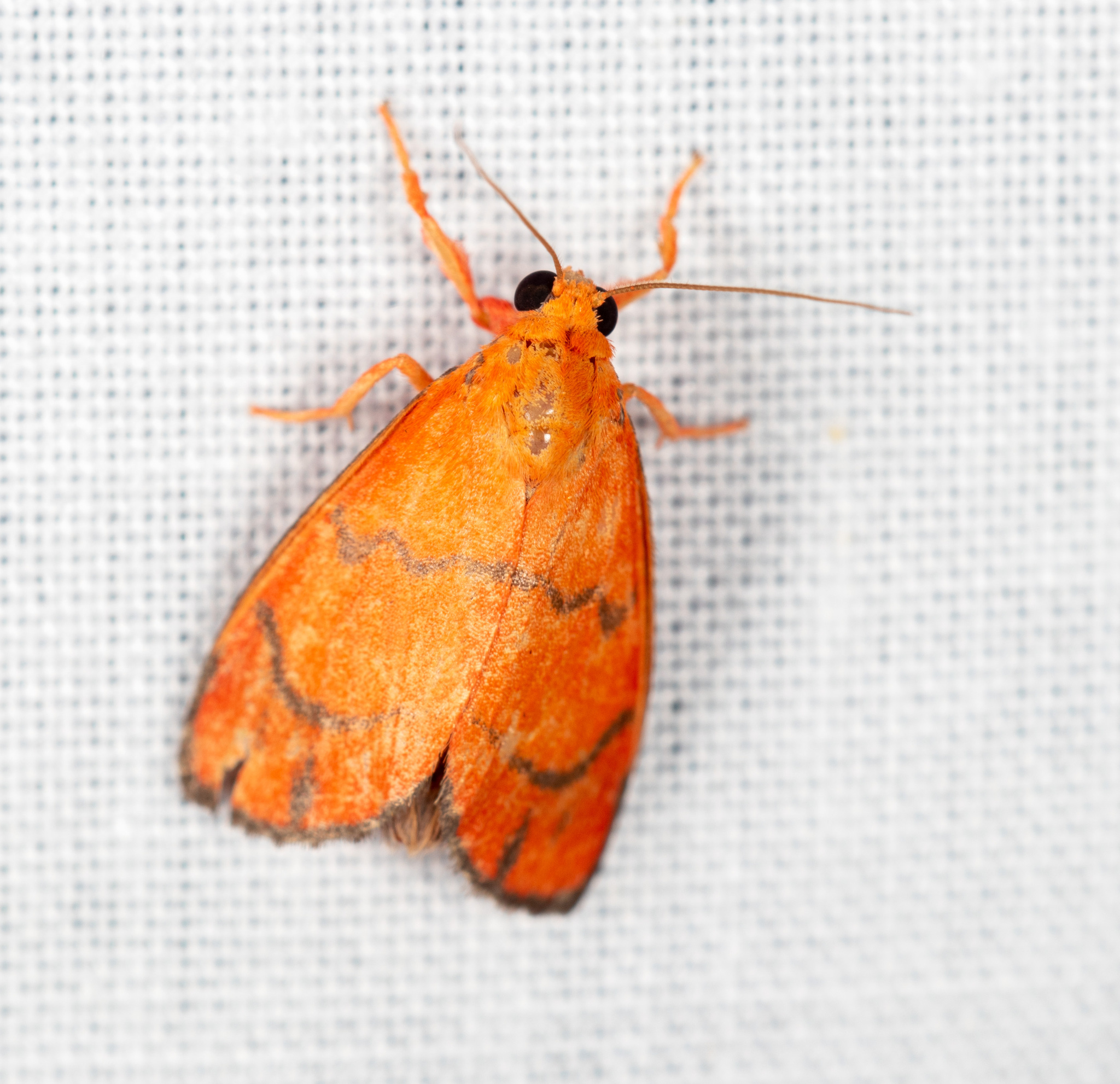
- Wittasura lineatus, Indonesia

Scientific classification
- Kingdom: Animalia
- Phylum: Arthropoda
- Class: Insecta
- Order: Lepidoptera
- Superfamily: Noctuoidea
- Family: Erebidae
- Subfamily: Arctiinae
- Tribe: Lithosiini
- Subtribe: Nudariina
- Genus: Wittasura
- Species: W. lineatus

Binomial name
- Wittasura lineatus (Walker, 1855)

Synonyms
- Ammatho lineatus Walker, 1855; Barsine borneonicola Strand, 1922; Barsine lineatus (Walker, 1855); Miltochrista plumbilineata Hampson, 1900

= Wittasura lineatus =

Species of moth

Wittasura lineatus is a species in the moth family Erebidae, found in Southeast Asia.

== Subspecies ==
These two subspecies belong to the species Wittasura lineatus:

- Wittasura lineatus calligenioides (Snellen, 1879)
- Wittasura lineatus lineatus (Walker, 1855)
