= Chrysallactis pulchra =

Scientific classification
- Domain: Eukaryota
- Kingdom: Animalia
- Phylum: Arthropoda
- Class: Insecta
- Order: Lepidoptera
- Superfamily: Noctuoidea
- Family: Erebidae
- Subfamily: Arctiinae
- Genus: Chrysallactis
- Species: C. pulchra

Binomial name
- Chrysallactis pulchra Röber, 1925

Species of moth

Chrysallactis pulchra is a moth of the family Erebidae first described by Röber in 1925. It is found in Papua New Guinea.
