= Eriomastyx griseobasis =

Scientific classification
- Domain: Eukaryota
- Kingdom: Animalia
- Phylum: Arthropoda
- Class: Insecta
- Order: Lepidoptera
- Superfamily: Noctuoidea
- Family: Erebidae
- Subfamily: Arctiinae
- Genus: Eriomastyx
- Species: E. griseobasis

Binomial name
- Eriomastyx griseobasis (Rothschild, 1913)

Synonyms
- Chamaita griseobasis Rothschild, 1913; Teinomastyx griseobasis

Species of moth

Eriomastyx griseobasis is a moth of the subfamily Arctiinae. It is found in New Guinea.
