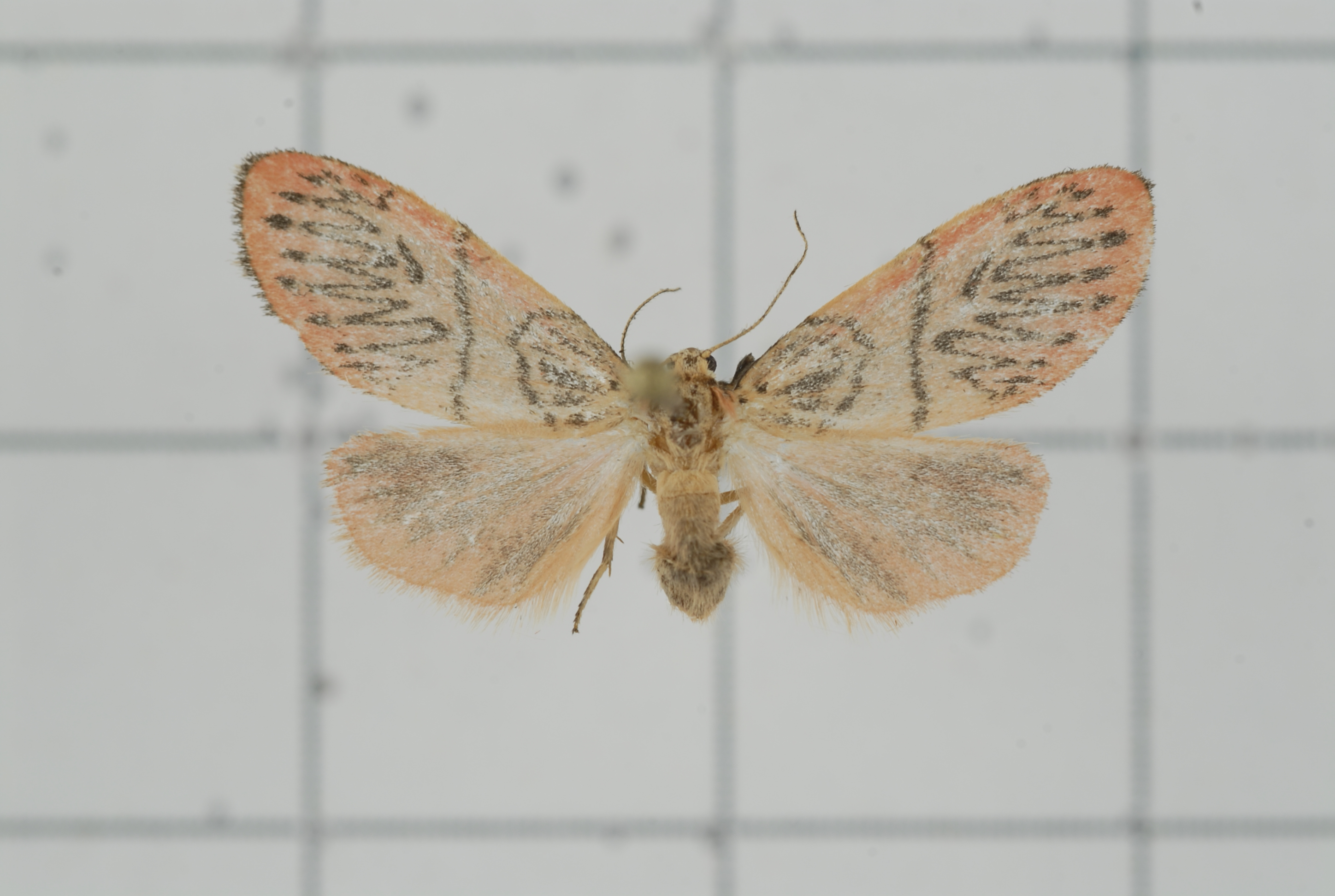

Scientific classification
- Domain: Eukaryota
- Kingdom: Animalia
- Phylum: Arthropoda
- Class: Insecta
- Order: Lepidoptera
- Superfamily: Noctuoidea
- Family: Erebidae
- Subfamily: Arctiinae
- Genus: Sesapa
- Species: S. koshunica

Binomial name
- Sesapa koshunica (Strand, 1917)

Synonyms
- Miltochrista koshunica Strand, 1917

= Sesapa koshunica =

Species of moth

Sesapa koshunica is a moth of the family Erebidae. It was described by Strand in 1917. It is found in Taiwan.
