= Disparsine crustata =

Scientific classification
- Domain: Eukaryota
- Kingdom: Animalia
- Phylum: Arthropoda
- Class: Insecta
- Order: Lepidoptera
- Superfamily: Noctuoidea
- Family: Erebidae
- Subfamily: Arctiinae
- Genus: Disparsine
- Species: D. crustata

Binomial name
- Disparsine crustata (Talbot, 1926)

Synonyms
- Barsine crustata (Talbot, 1926)

Species of moth

Disparsine crustata is a species of moth of the family Erebidae, subfamily Arctiinae. It is found on Borneo, Peninsular Malaysia and Sumatra. The habitat consists of lowland forests, including heath forests.

Adults are sexually dimorphic. They are red with blackish fringes.
