= Eriomastyx =

Scientific classification
- Domain: Eukaryota
- Kingdom: Animalia
- Phylum: Arthropoda
- Class: Insecta
- Order: Lepidoptera
- Superfamily: Noctuoidea
- Family: Erebidae
- Subfamily: Arctiinae
- Tribe: Lithosiini
- Subtribe: Nudariina
- Genus: Eriomastyx; Rothschild & Jordan, 1905

Synonyms
- Teinomastyx Hampson, 1914

Genus of moths

Eriomastyx is a genus of moths in the family Erebidae. The genus was erected by Rothschild and Jordan in 1905.

== Species ==
- Eriomastyx griseobasis (Rothschild, 1913)
- Eriomastyx lacteata Rothschild, 1916
- Eriomastyx latus Rothschild & Jordan, 1905
