= Barsaurea phaeoxanthia =

Scientific classification
- Kingdom: Animalia
- Phylum: Arthropoda
- Class: Insecta
- Order: Lepidoptera
- Superfamily: Noctuoidea
- Family: Erebidae
- Subfamily: Arctiinae
- Tribe: Lithosiini
- Genus: Barsaurea
- Species: B. phaeoxanthia

Binomial name
- Barsaurea phaeoxanthia (Hampson, 1900)

Synonyms
- Barsine phaeoxanthia (Hampson, 1900); Miltochrista phaeoxantha Hampson, 1900; Miltochrista phaeoxanthia Hampson, 1900

Species of moth

Barsaurea phaeoxanthia is a species in the moth family Erebidae, found from India to Southeast Asia.
