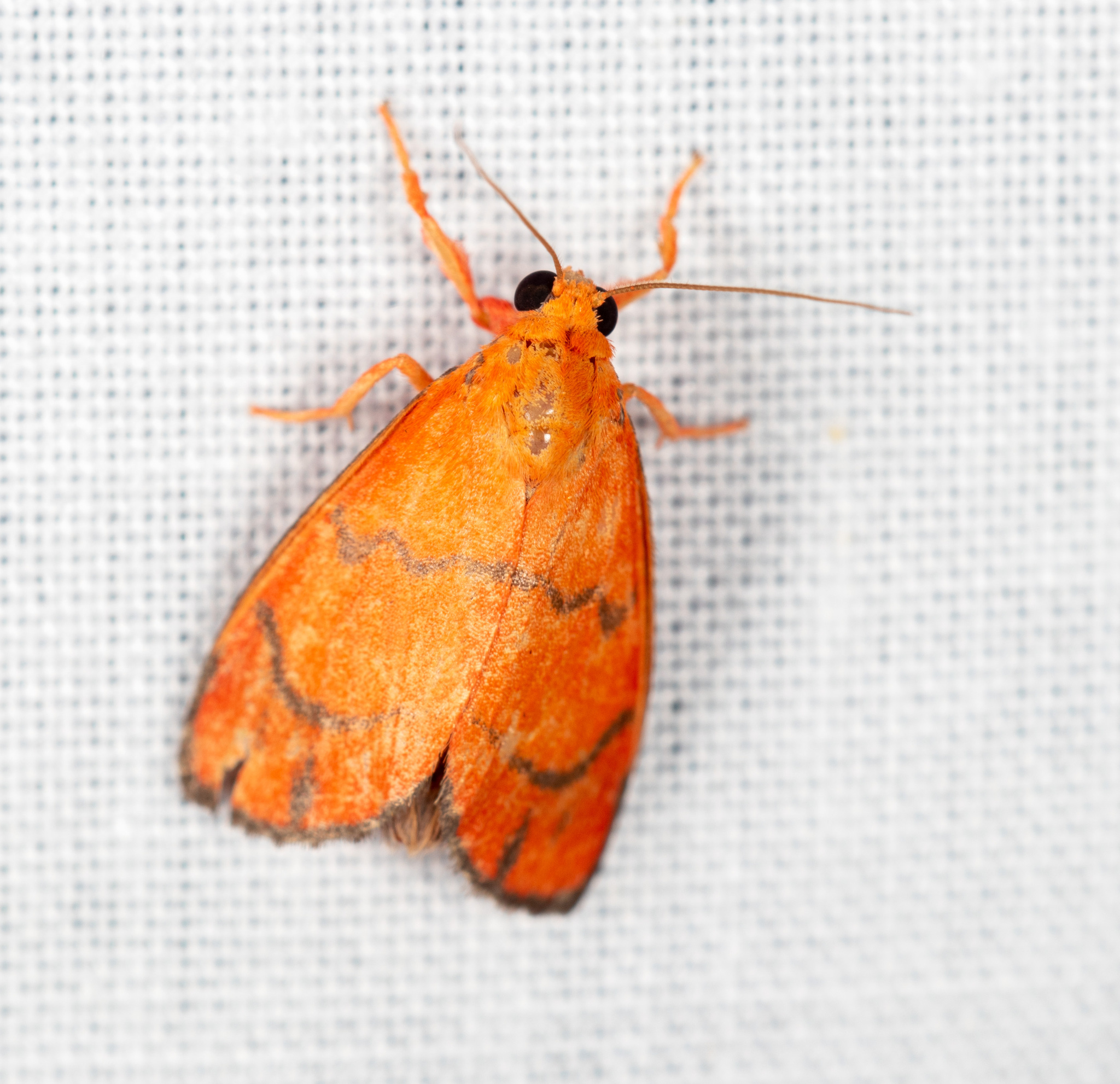
- Wittasura lineatus, Indonesia

Scientific classification
- Kingdom: Animalia
- Phylum: Arthropoda
- Class: Insecta
- Order: Lepidoptera
- Superfamily: Noctuoidea
- Family: Erebidae
- Subfamily: Arctiinae
- Tribe: Lithosiini
- Subtribe: Nudariina
- Genus: Wittasura; Volynkin, 2019

= Wittasura =

Genus of moths

Wittasura is a genus in the moth family Erebidae. There are at least three described species in Wittasura, found in the Sundaland region, the Philippines, and Sulawesi Island.

== Species ==
These three species belong to the genus Wittasura:

- Wittasura danieli (Arora, 1983)
- Wittasura lineatus (Walker, 1855)
- Wittasura trifasciata (Roepke, 1946)
