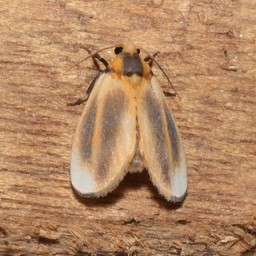

Scientific classification
- Kingdom: Animalia
- Phylum: Arthropoda
- Class: Insecta
- Order: Lepidoptera
- Superfamily: Noctuoidea
- Family: Erebidae
- Subfamily: Arctiinae
- Genus: Ovipennis
- Species: O. dudgeoni

Binomial name
- Ovipennis dudgeoni (Elwes, 1890)

Synonyms
- Nudaria dudgeoni Elwes, 1890

= Ovipennis dudgeoni =

Species of moth

Ovipennis dudgeoni is a species of moth in the subfamily Arctiinae. It was described by Henry John Elwes in 1890. It is found in Sikkim, India.
