= Idopterum =

Scientific classification
- Kingdom: Animalia
- Phylum: Arthropoda
- Class: Insecta
- Order: Lepidoptera
- Superfamily: Noctuoidea
- Family: Erebidae
- Subfamily: Arctiinae
- Tribe: Lithosiini
- Genus: Idopterum; Hampson, 1894

Synonyms
- Ammatho (Idopterum) Hampson, 1894

Genus of moths

Idopterum is a genus of moths in the subfamily Arctiinae. The genus was erected by George Hampson in 1894. Alternatively, Idopterum has been interpreted as a subgenus of Ammatho Walker, 1855. It is distributed in Indochina, Java, and the Bismarck Archipelago.

== Species ==
There are four recognized species within this genus or subgenus:

- Idopterum admirabilis Schaus, 1922
- Idopterum novaepommeraniae Strand, 1922
- Idopterum ovale Hampson, 1894
- Idopterum wuchunshengi (Huang, Volynkin & Wang, 2020)
