= Hemonia murina =

Scientific classification
- Domain: Eukaryota
- Kingdom: Animalia
- Phylum: Arthropoda
- Class: Insecta
- Order: Lepidoptera
- Superfamily: Noctuoidea
- Family: Erebidae
- Subfamily: Arctiinae
- Genus: Hemonia
- Species: H. murina

Binomial name
- Hemonia murina Rothschild, 1913

Species of moth

Hemonia murina is a moth of the family Erebidae. It was described by Walter Rothschild in 1913. It is found on New Guinea.
