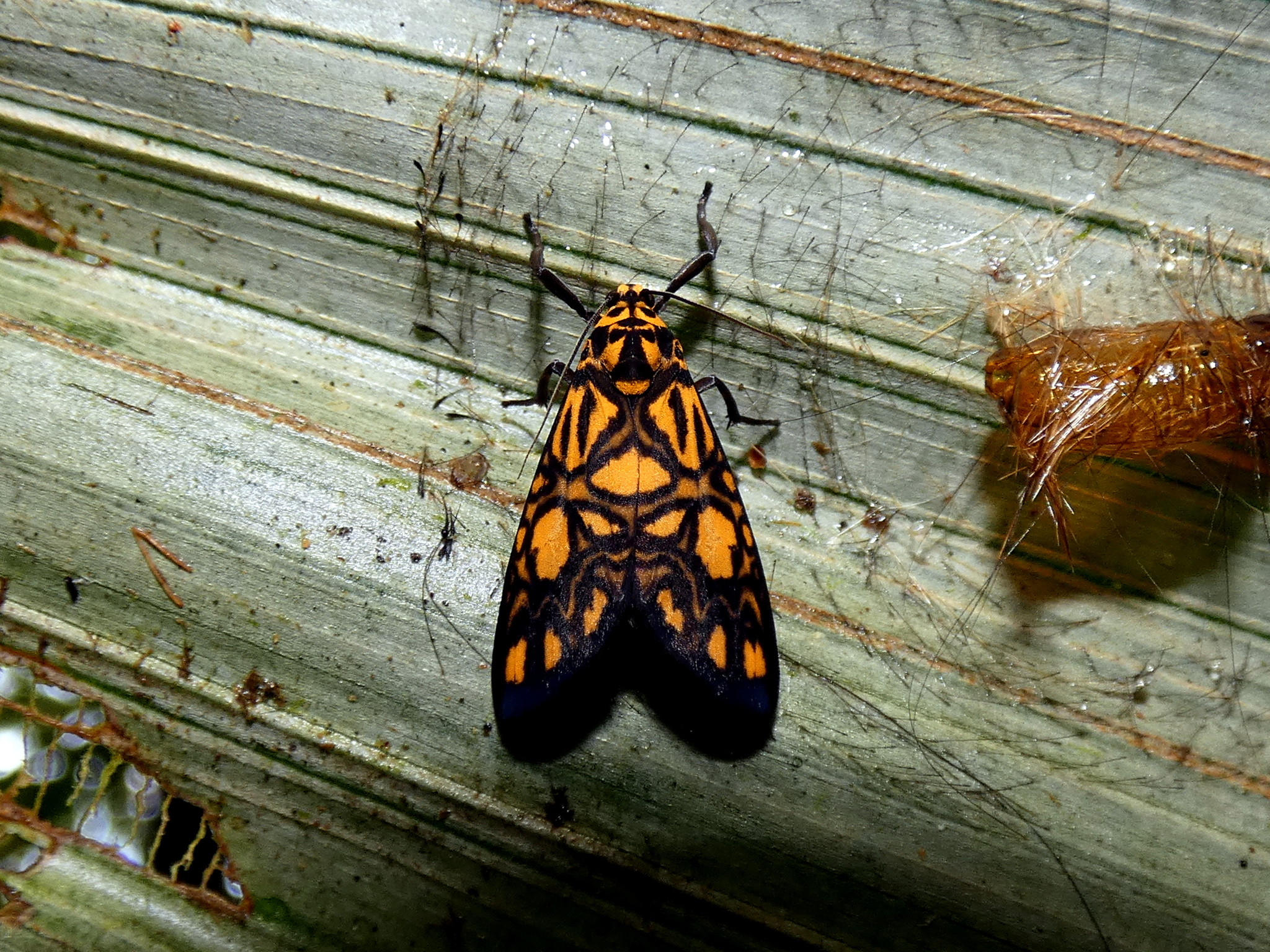

Scientific classification
- Kingdom: Animalia
- Phylum: Arthropoda
- Clade: Pancrustacea
- Class: Insecta
- Order: Lepidoptera
- Superfamily: Noctuoidea
- Family: Erebidae
- Subfamily: Arctiinae
- Genus: Graptasura
- Species: G. trilacunata

Binomial name
- Graptasura trilacunata Holloway, 2001

= Graptasura trilacunata =

Species of moth

Graptasura trilacunata is a moth of the subfamily Arctiinae. It was described by Jeremy Daniel Holloway in 2001. It is found on Borneo. The habitat consists of lowland forests.

The length of the forewings is 11–12 mm.
