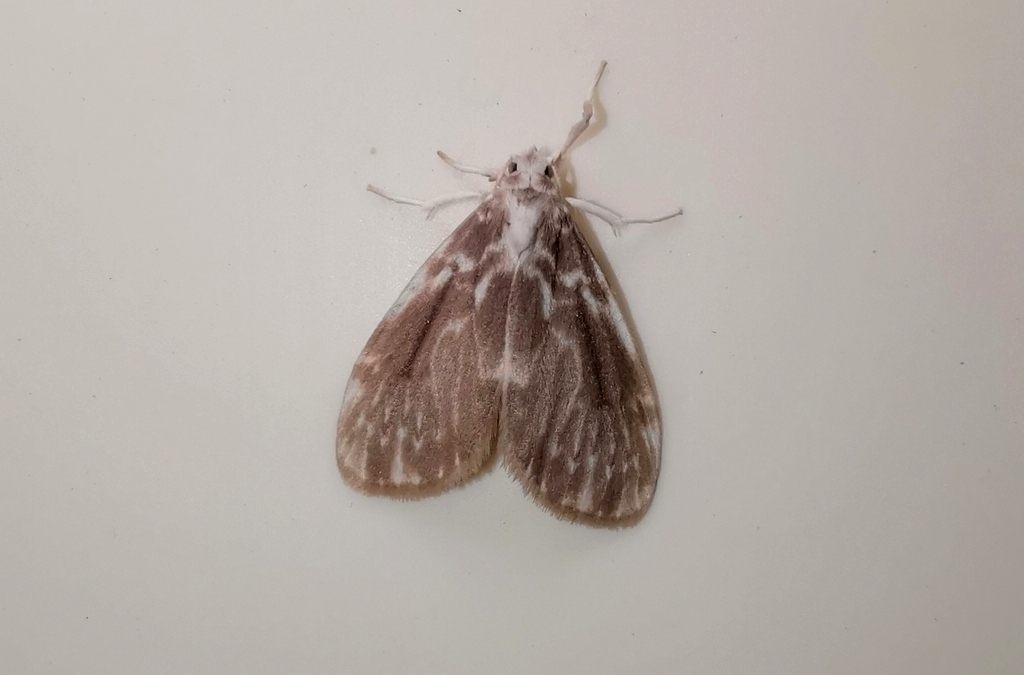
- Cabardites phifa

Scientific classification
- Kingdom: Animalia
- Phylum: Arthropoda
- Clade: Pancrustacea
- Class: Insecta
- Order: Lepidoptera
- Superfamily: Noctuoidea
- Family: Erebidae
- Subfamily: Arctiinae
- Tribe: Lithosiini
- Subtribe: Nudariina
- Genus: Cabardites; Volynkin & Černý, 2021

Type species
- Asura limbata Wileman, 1911

= Cabardites =

Genus of moths

Cabardites is a genus of moths in the family Erebidae and subfamily Arctiinae. The genus was erected by Anton V. Volynkin and Karel Černý in 2021 for the "Adites maculata" species-group, with Asura limbata Wileman, 1911 as the type species. Species of the genus have been recorded from Southeast Asia and East Asia, including Thailand, Vietnam, China and Taiwan.

== Taxonomy ==
Cabardites was established in 2021 by Volynkin and Černý. Their revision placed several species formerly treated under other genera into Cabardites and described new species from northern Indochina and eastern China. The original description treated Asura limbata Wileman, 1911 as the type species of the genus.

A later paper by Zhao, Wu and Han in 2023 described two additional species, C. xinyui and C. unicornuta, from China and reported C. varanagara as a new record from China.

== Description ==
Members of Cabardites are small moths. A taxonomic treatment of the genus describes the adults as having pale heads and antennae, with forewings marked by brown areas and pale transverse lines. The genus is also diagnosed in the taxonomic literature using structures of the male and female genitalia.

== Species ==
The following species are placed in the genus Cabardites:

- Cabardites auco Volynkin & Černý, 2021
- Cabardites guanyin Volynkin & Černý, 2021
- Cabardites limbata (Wileman, 1911)
- Cabardites maculata (Poujade, 1886)
- Cabardites phifa Volynkin & Černý, 2021
- Cabardites pica (Wileman, 1911)
- Cabardites tiendung Volynkin & Černý, 2021
- Cabardites unicornuta Zhao, Wu & Han, 2023
- Cabardites varanagara Volynkin & Černý, 2021
- Cabardites xinyui Zhao, Wu & Han, 2023

== Distribution ==
Cabardites is known from northern Indochina, continental China and Taiwan. Species of the genus have been recorded from Thailand, Vietnam, China and Taiwan. Zhao, Wu and Han later described two additional Chinese species, C. xinyui and C. unicornuta, and reported C. varanagara from China for the first time.
