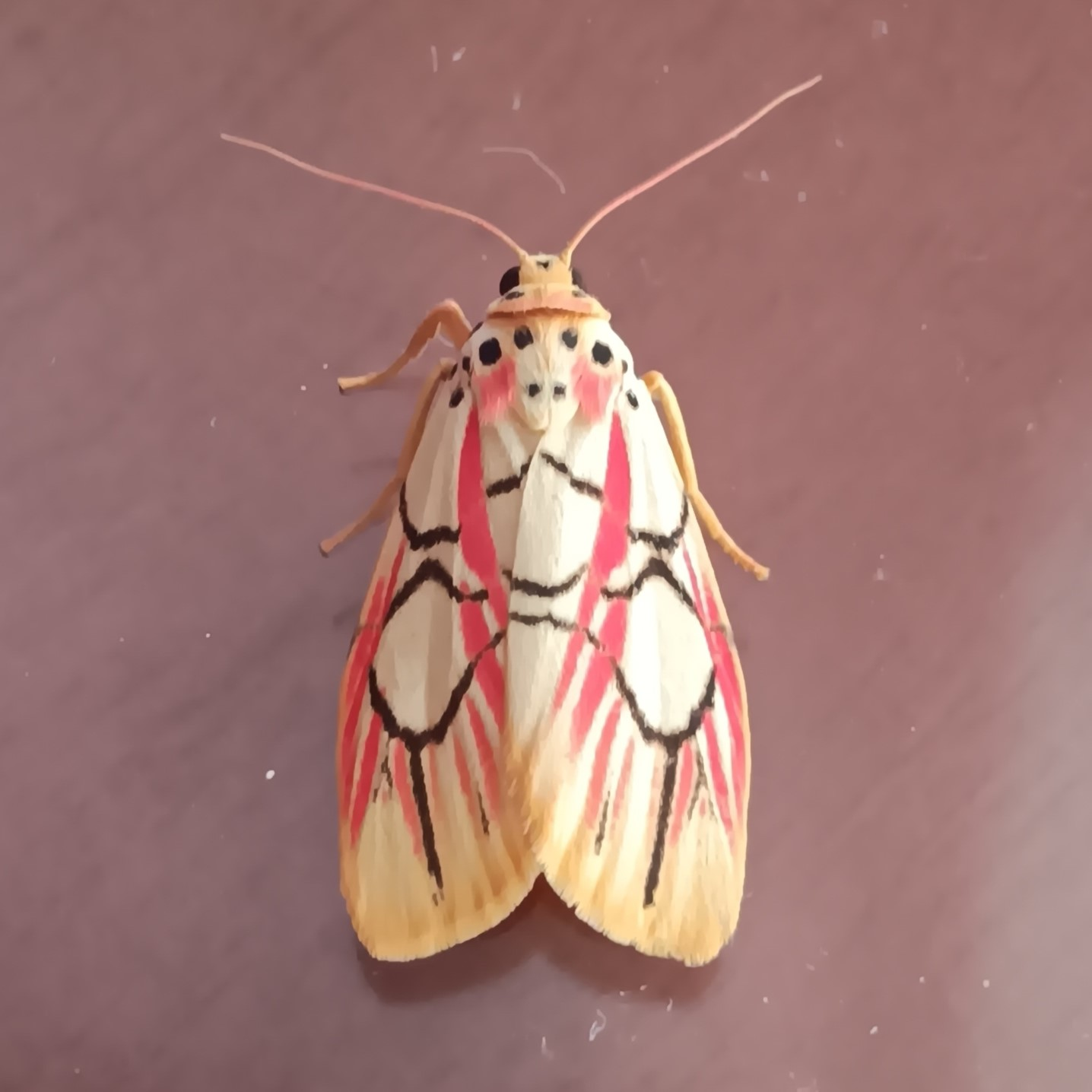

Scientific classification
- Kingdom: Animalia
- Phylum: Arthropoda
- Class: Insecta
- Order: Lepidoptera
- Superfamily: Noctuoidea
- Family: Erebidae
- Subfamily: Arctiinae
- Genus: Ammatho
- Species: A. duopunctata

Binomial name
- Ammatho duopunctata (Semper, 1899)

Synonyms
- Miltochrista duopunctata Semper, 1899

= Ammatho duopunctata =

Species of moth

Ammatho duopunctata is a species of moth in the family Erebidae. It is found in the Philippines and Southeast Asia.
