= Amphisine =

Scientific classification
- Kingdom: Animalia
- Phylum: Arthropoda
- Class: Insecta
- Order: Lepidoptera
- Superfamily: Noctuoidea
- Family: Erebidae
- Subfamily: Arctiinae
- Tribe: Lithosiini
- Subtribe: Nudariina
- Genus: Amphisine; Volynkin, 2019

Type species
- Amphisine perpusilla (Walker, 1862)

Genus of moths

Amphisine is a genus of erebid moths, first described by Volynkin in 2019.

== Species ==
- Amphisine asaphes (Hampson, 1900)
- Amphisine cursiva (Černý, 2009)
- Amphisine latigrapha (Černý, 2009)
- Amphisine lutivittata (Wileman & West, 1928)
- Amphisine perpusilla (Walker, 1862)
