= Acco bicolora =

Scientific classification
- Kingdom: Animalia
- Phylum: Arthropoda
- Clade: Pancrustacea
- Class: Insecta
- Order: Lepidoptera
- Superfamily: Noctuoidea
- Family: Erebidae
- Subfamily: Arctiinae
- Genus: Acco
- Species: A. bicolora

Binomial name
- Acco bicolora Bethune-Baker, 1904

Species of moth

Acco bicolora is a moth of the family Erebidae. It was described by George Thomas Bethune-Baker in 1904. It is found in New Guinea.
