= Arctelene =

Scientific classification
- Domain: Eukaryota
- Kingdom: Animalia
- Phylum: Arthropoda
- Class: Insecta
- Order: Lepidoptera
- Superfamily: Noctuoidea
- Family: Erebidae
- Subfamily: Arctiinae
- Subtribe: Nudariina
- Genus: Arctelene; Kirti & N.S. Gill, 2008

Genus of moths

Arctelene is a genus of moths in the family Erebidae.

== Species ==
- Arctelene lateritia (Černý, 2009)
- Arctelene rufescens Kirti & N.S. Gill, 2008
- Arctelene uncodes Kirti & N.S. Gill, 2008
