= Idopterum novaepommeraniae =

Scientific classification
- Kingdom: Animalia
- Phylum: Arthropoda
- Class: Insecta
- Order: Lepidoptera
- Superfamily: Noctuoidea
- Family: Erebidae
- Subfamily: Arctiinae
- Genus: Idopterum
- Species: I. novaepommeraniae

Binomial name
- Idopterum novaepommeraniae Strand, 1922

Species of moth

Idopterum novaepommeraniae is a moth of the subfamily Arctiinae. It was described by Strand in 1922. It is found on the Bismarck Archipelago.
