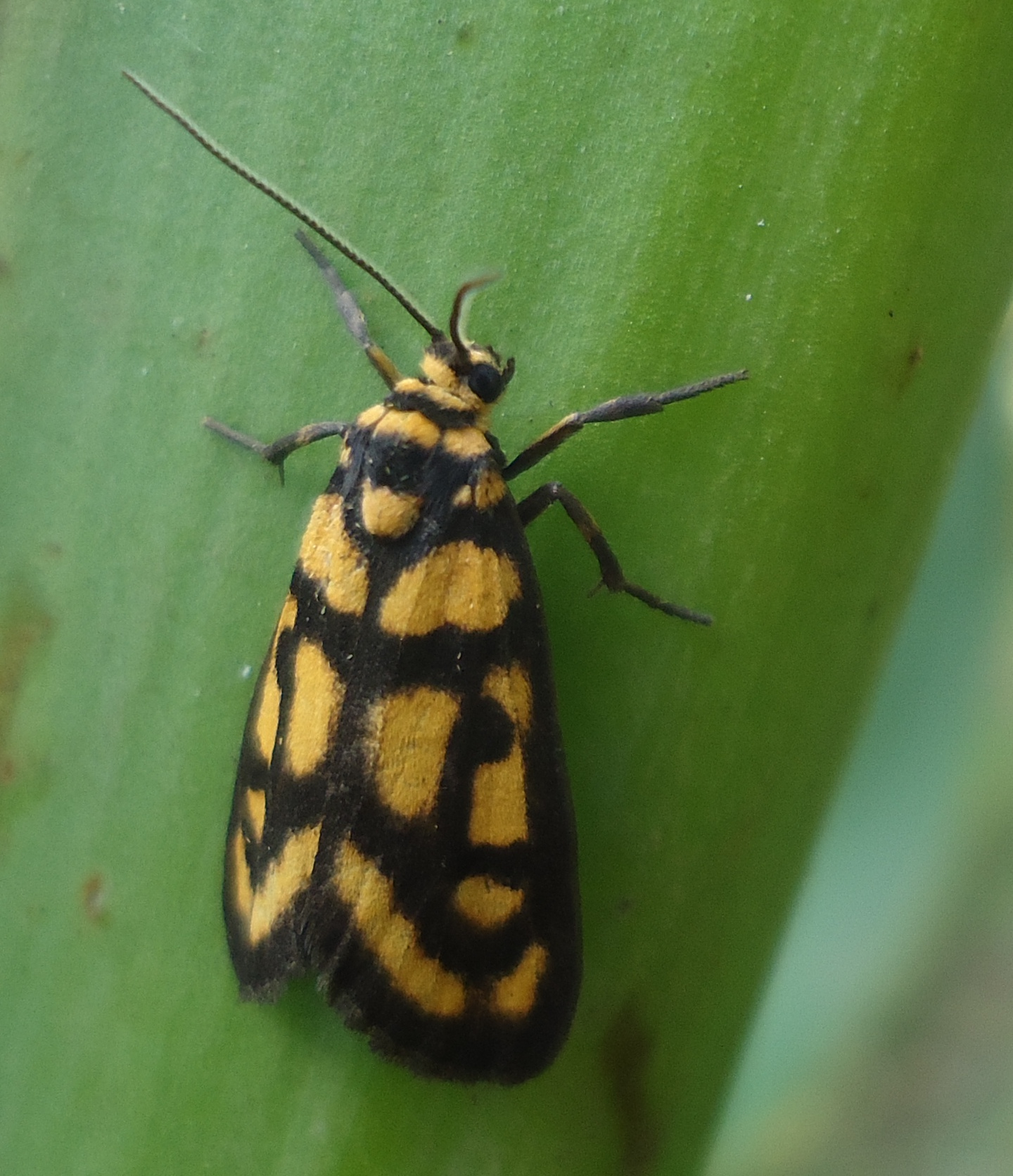

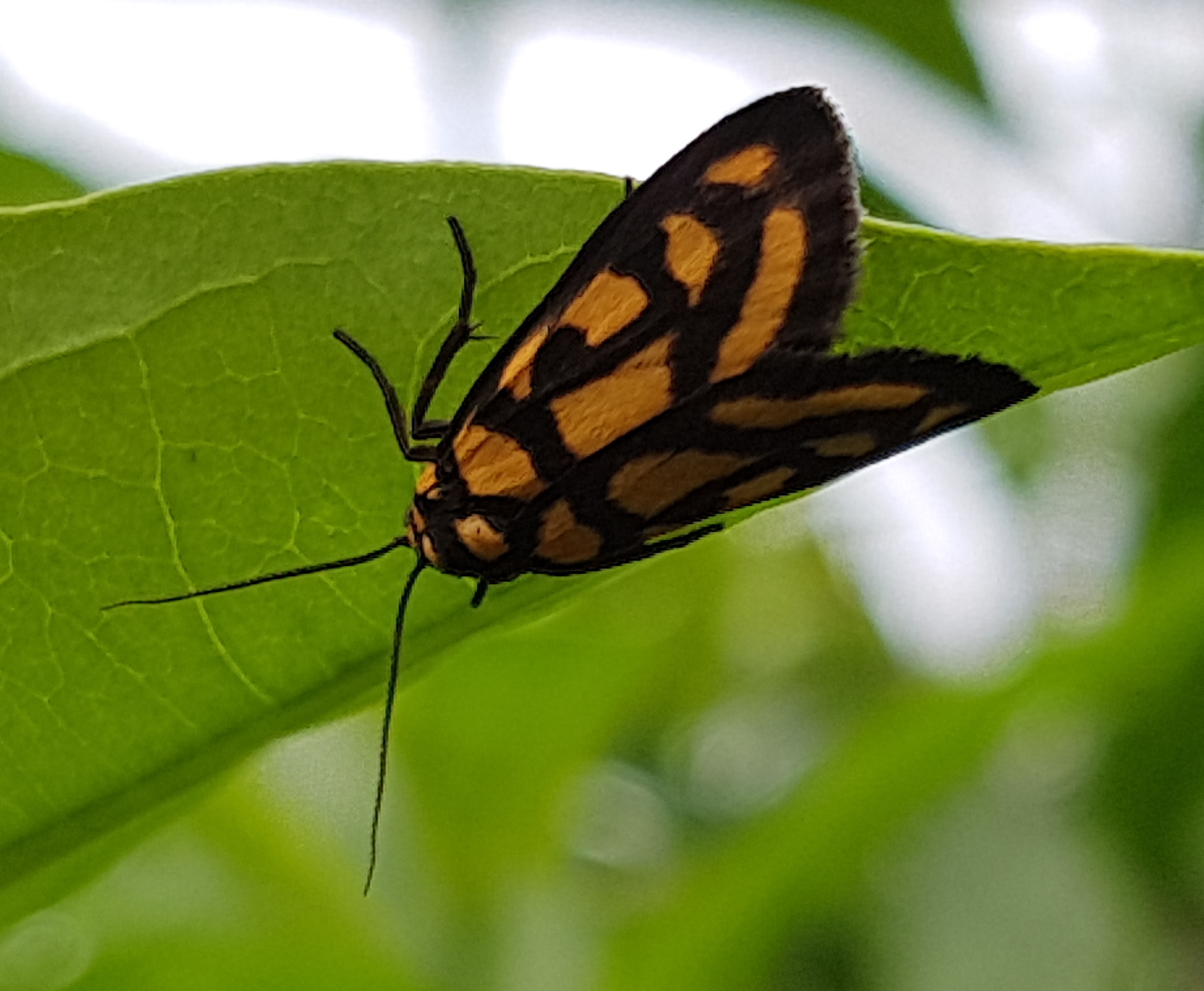

Scientific classification
- Kingdom: Animalia
- Phylum: Arthropoda
- Class: Insecta
- Order: Lepidoptera
- Superfamily: Noctuoidea
- Family: Erebidae
- Subfamily: Arctiinae
- Subtribe: Nudariina
- Genus: Xanthetis; Hampson, 1900
- Species: X. luzonica

Binomial name
- Xanthetis luzonica (Felder, 1875)

Synonyms
- Cyme luzonica Felder, 1875; Peronetis naringa C. Swinhoe, 1892

= Xanthetis =

Genus of moths

Xanthetis is a monotypic moth genus in the family Erebidae erected by George Hampson in 1900. Its single species, Xanthetis luzonica, was first described by Felder in 1875. It is found in the Philippines.
