= Cyclomilta melanolepia =

Scientific classification
- Domain: Eukaryota
- Kingdom: Animalia
- Phylum: Arthropoda
- Class: Insecta
- Order: Lepidoptera
- Superfamily: Noctuoidea
- Family: Erebidae
- Subfamily: Arctiinae
- Genus: Cyclomilta
- Species: C. melanolepia

Binomial name
- Cyclomilta melanolepia (Dudgeon, 1900)

Species of moth

Cyclomilta melanolepia is a moth of the family Erebidae. It was described by Gerald C. Dudgeon in 1900. It is found in Sikkim, India.
