= Crocodeta variegata =

Scientific classification
- Domain: Eukaryota
- Kingdom: Animalia
- Phylum: Arthropoda
- Class: Insecta
- Order: Lepidoptera
- Superfamily: Noctuoidea
- Family: Erebidae
- Subfamily: Arctiinae
- Genus: Crocodeta
- Species: C. variegata

Binomial name
- Crocodeta variegata (Rothschild, 1913)

Synonyms
- Nudaria variegata Rothschild, 1913; Crocodeta parallelaria Gaede, 1925

Species of moth

Crocodeta variegata is a moth of the family Erebidae first described by Walter Rothschild in 1913. It is found in Papua New Guinea.
