= Paradohertya =

Scientific classification
- Domain: Eukaryota
- Kingdom: Animalia
- Phylum: Arthropoda
- Class: Insecta
- Order: Lepidoptera
- Superfamily: Noctuoidea
- Family: Erebidae
- Subfamily: Arctiinae
- Subtribe: Nudariina
- Genus: Paradohertya; Bethune-Baker, 1904
- Species: P. trifascia

Binomial name
- Paradohertya trifascia Bethune-Baker, 1904

Synonyms
- Paradohertya albomaculata Bethune-Baker, 1904

Genus of moths

Paradohertya is a monotypic moth genus in the family Erebidae. Its single species, Paradohertya trifascia, is found in Papua New Guinea. Both the genus and species were first described by George Thomas Bethune-Baker in 1904.
