= Caprimimodes =

Scientific classification
- Domain: Eukaryota
- Kingdom: Animalia
- Phylum: Arthropoda
- Class: Insecta
- Order: Lepidoptera
- Superfamily: Noctuoidea
- Family: Erebidae
- Subfamily: Arctiinae
- Subtribe: Nudariina
- Genus: Caprimimodes; Rothschild, 1913
- Species: C. mimetica

Binomial name
- Caprimimodes mimetica Rothschild, 1913

Genus of moths

Caprimimodes is a monotypic moth genus in the family Erebidae. Its single species, Caprimimodes mimetica, is found in Papua New Guinea. Both the genus and species were first described by Walter Rothschild in 1913.
