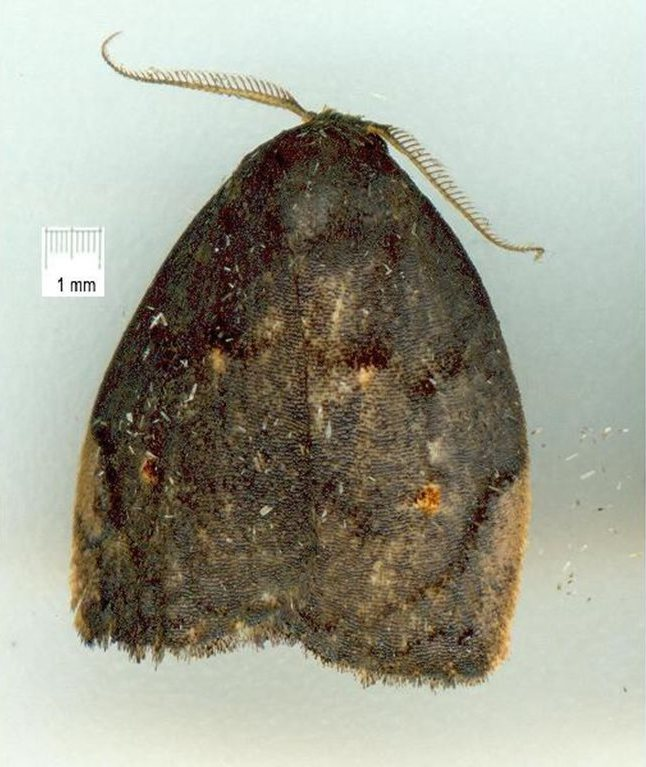
- H. micrommata in Queensland, Australia

Scientific classification
- Domain: Eukaryota
- Kingdom: Animalia
- Phylum: Arthropoda
- Class: Insecta
- Order: Lepidoptera
- Superfamily: Noctuoidea
- Family: Erebidae
- Subfamily: Arctiinae
- Genus: Hemonia
- Species: H. micrommata

Binomial name
- Hemonia micrommata (Turner, 1899)

Synonyms
- Eurodes micrommata Turner, 1899

= Hemonia micrommata =

Species of moth

Hemonia micrommata is a moth of the family Erebidae. It was described by Alfred Jefferis Turner in 1899. It is found in northern Australia.
