= Idopterum ovale =

Scientific classification
- Kingdom: Animalia
- Phylum: Arthropoda
- Clade: Pancrustacea
- Class: Insecta
- Order: Lepidoptera
- Superfamily: Noctuoidea
- Family: Erebidae
- Subfamily: Arctiinae
- Genus: Idopterum
- Species: I. ovale

Binomial name
- Idopterum ovale Hampson, 1894

Synonyms
- Ammatho (Idopterum) ovale (Hampson, 1894)

Species of moth

Idopterum ovale is a moth of the subfamily Arctiinae. It was described by George Hampson in 1894. It is found in Myanmar, Thailand, Vietnam, and Yunnan (China).
