= Thermograpta =

Scientific classification
- Kingdom: Animalia
- Phylum: Arthropoda
- Class: Insecta
- Order: Lepidoptera
- Superfamily: Noctuoidea
- Family: Erebidae
- Subfamily: Arctiinae
- Subtribe: Nudariina
- Genus: Thermograpta; Hampson, 1914
- Species: T. rufizonata

Binomial name
- Thermograpta rufizonata Hampson, 1914

Genus of moths

Thermograpta is a monotypic moth genus in the family Erebidae. Its single species, Thermograpta rufizonata, is found in New Guinea. Both the genus and species were first described by George Hampson in 1914.
