= Delineatia delineata =

Scientific classification
- Kingdom: Animalia
- Phylum: Arthropoda
- Class: Insecta
- Order: Lepidoptera
- Superfamily: Noctuoidea
- Family: Erebidae
- Subfamily: Arctiinae
- Tribe: Lithosiini
- Genus: Delineatia
- Species: D. delineata

Binomial name
- Delineatia delineata (Walker, 1854)

Synonyms
- Ammatho delineata (Walker, 1854); Ammatho figuratus Walker, 1855; Ammatho fuscescens Butler, 1877; Barsine delineata (Walker, 1854); Cyme chinensis Felder, 1862; Hypocrita rhodina Herrich-Schäffer, 1855; Hypoprepia delineata Walker, 1854; Miltochrista chinensis (Felder, 1862); Miltochrista coalescens Draudt, 1914; Miltochrista delineata (Walker, 1854); Miltochrista delineata coalescens Draudt, 1914; Miltochrista dimidiata Fang, 1991; Miltochrista figuratus (Walker, 1855); Miltochrista fuscescens (Butler, 1877); Miltochrista rhodina (Herrich-Schäffer, 1855)

Species of moth

Delineatia delineata is a species in the moth family Erebidae, found in China and southeast Asia.

The wingspan is 26–33 mm.
