= Caulocera crassicornis =

Scientific classification
- Kingdom: Animalia
- Phylum: Arthropoda
- Class: Insecta
- Order: Lepidoptera
- Superfamily: Noctuoidea
- Family: Erebidae
- Subfamily: Arctiinae
- Genus: Caulocera
- Species: C. crassicornis

Binomial name
- Caulocera crassicornis Walker, 1862

Species of moth

Caulocera crassicornis is a moth of the subfamily Arctiinae. It is found on Borneo, Peninsular Malaysia and Bali.
