= Disparsine =

Scientific classification
- Kingdom: Animalia
- Phylum: Arthropoda
- Class: Insecta
- Order: Lepidoptera
- Superfamily: Noctuoidea
- Family: Erebidae
- Subfamily: Arctiinae
- Tribe: Lithosiini
- Subtribe: Nudariina
- Genus: Disparsine; Volynkin, 2019

Type species
- Disparsine crustata (Talbot, 1926)

Genus of moths

Disparsine is a genus of erebid moths, established by Volynkin in 2019. Species in the genus were previously classified in the genus Barsine.

== Species ==
- Disparsine crustata (Talbot, 1926)
- Disparsine nigrocincta (Snellen, 1879)
