= Caulocera xantholopha =

Scientific classification
- Kingdom: Animalia
- Phylum: Arthropoda
- Class: Insecta
- Order: Lepidoptera
- Superfamily: Noctuoidea
- Family: Erebidae
- Subfamily: Arctiinae
- Genus: Caulocera
- Species: C. xantholopha

Binomial name
- Caulocera xantholopha Hampson, 1900

Species of moth

Caulocera xantholopha is a moth of the subfamily Arctiinae. It is found on Borneo (Pulo Laut).
