= Graptasura mesilau =

Scientific classification
- Kingdom: Animalia
- Phylum: Arthropoda
- Clade: Pancrustacea
- Class: Insecta
- Order: Lepidoptera
- Superfamily: Noctuoidea
- Family: Erebidae
- Subfamily: Arctiinae
- Genus: Graptasura
- Species: G. mesilau

Binomial name
- Graptasura mesilau Holloway, 2001

Species of moth

Graptasura mesilau is a moth of the subfamily Arctiinae. It was described by Jeremy Daniel Holloway in 2001. It is found on Borneo. The habitat consists of montane forests.

The length of the forewings is about 10 mm.
