= Fossia punicea =

Scientific classification
- Kingdom: Animalia
- Phylum: Arthropoda
- Class: Insecta
- Order: Lepidoptera
- Superfamily: Noctuoidea
- Family: Erebidae
- Subfamily: Arctiinae
- Tribe: Lithosiini
- Genus: Fossia
- Species: F. punicea

Binomial name
- Fossia punicea (Moore, 1878)

Synonyms
- Barsine punicea Moore, 1878; Miltochrista punicea (Moore, 1878)

Species of moth

Fossia punicea is a species in the moth family Erebidae, found in southern Asia.

== Subspecies ==
These three subspecies belong to the species Fossia punicea:

- Fossia punicea kachina (Volynkin & Černý, 2018)
- Fossia punicea punicea (Moore, 1878)
- Fossia punicea rothschildi (Draudt, 1914)
