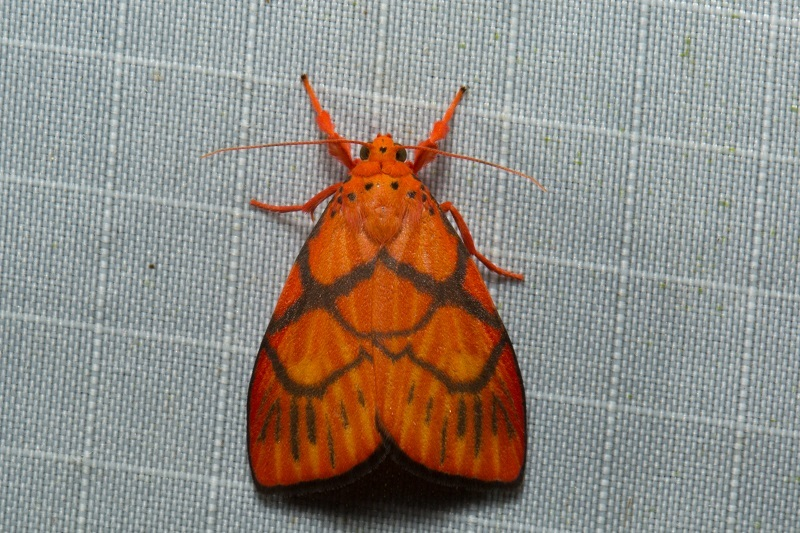
- Sarbine cruciata in Fraser's Hill, Pahang, Malaysia

Scientific classification
- Kingdom: Animalia
- Phylum: Arthropoda
- Clade: Pancrustacea
- Class: Insecta
- Order: Lepidoptera
- Superfamily: Noctuoidea
- Family: Erebidae
- Subfamily: Arctiinae
- Subtribe: Nudariina
- Genus: Sarbine; Volynkin, 2019

Type species
- Miltochrista flavodiscalis Talbot, 1926

= Sarbine =

Genus of moths

Sarbine is a genus of Erebid moths, first described by Volynkin in 2019.

== Species ==
- Sarbine cruciata (Walker, 1862)
- Sarbine flavodiscalis (Talbot, 1926)
- Sarbine hreblayi (Volynkin & Černý, 2019)
- Sarbine siberuta (Volynkin & Černý, 2019)
