= Graptasura polygrapha =

Scientific classification
- Kingdom: Animalia
- Phylum: Arthropoda
- Class: Insecta
- Order: Lepidoptera
- Superfamily: Noctuoidea
- Family: Erebidae
- Subfamily: Arctiinae
- Genus: Graptasura
- Species: G. polygrapha

Binomial name
- Graptasura polygrapha (Felder, 1874)

Synonyms
- Cyme polygrapha Felder, 1874

Species of moth

Graptasura polygrapha is a moth of the subfamily Arctiinae. It was described by Felder in 1874. It is found on Sulawesi in Indonesia.
