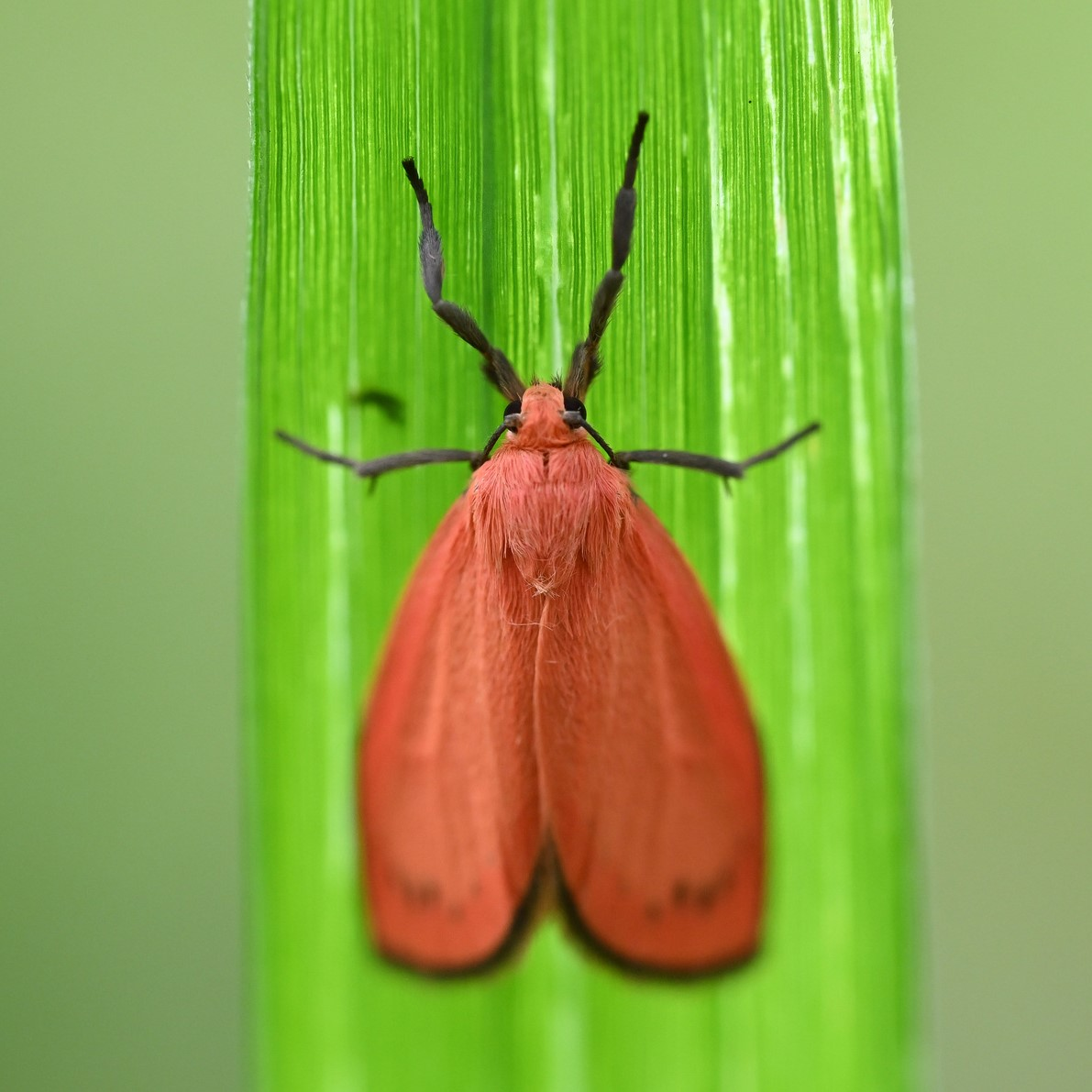
- Sesapa sanguinea

Scientific classification
- Kingdom: Animalia
- Phylum: Arthropoda
- Clade: Pancrustacea
- Class: Insecta
- Order: Lepidoptera
- Superfamily: Noctuoidea
- Family: Erebidae
- Subfamily: Arctiinae
- Tribe: Lithosiini
- Subtribe: Nudariina
- Genus: Sesapa; Walker, 1854

Subgenera
- Nipponasura Inoue, 1965; Sesapa Walker, 1854

= Sesapa =

Genus of moths

Sesapa is a genus of lichen moths in the family Erebidae. There are about seven species described in the genus Sesapa, found in Taiwan, eastern China, and Southeast Asia.

== Species ==
The following species are recognised in the genus Sesapa:

- Sesapa inouei Volynkin, 2017
- Sesapa inscripta Walker, 1854
- Sesapa kishidai Wu, 2019
- Sesapa koshunica (Strand, 1917)
- Sesapa sanguinea (Moore, 1877)
- Sesapa strandiana Volynkin, 2019
- Sesapa taiflamma Wu, 2019
