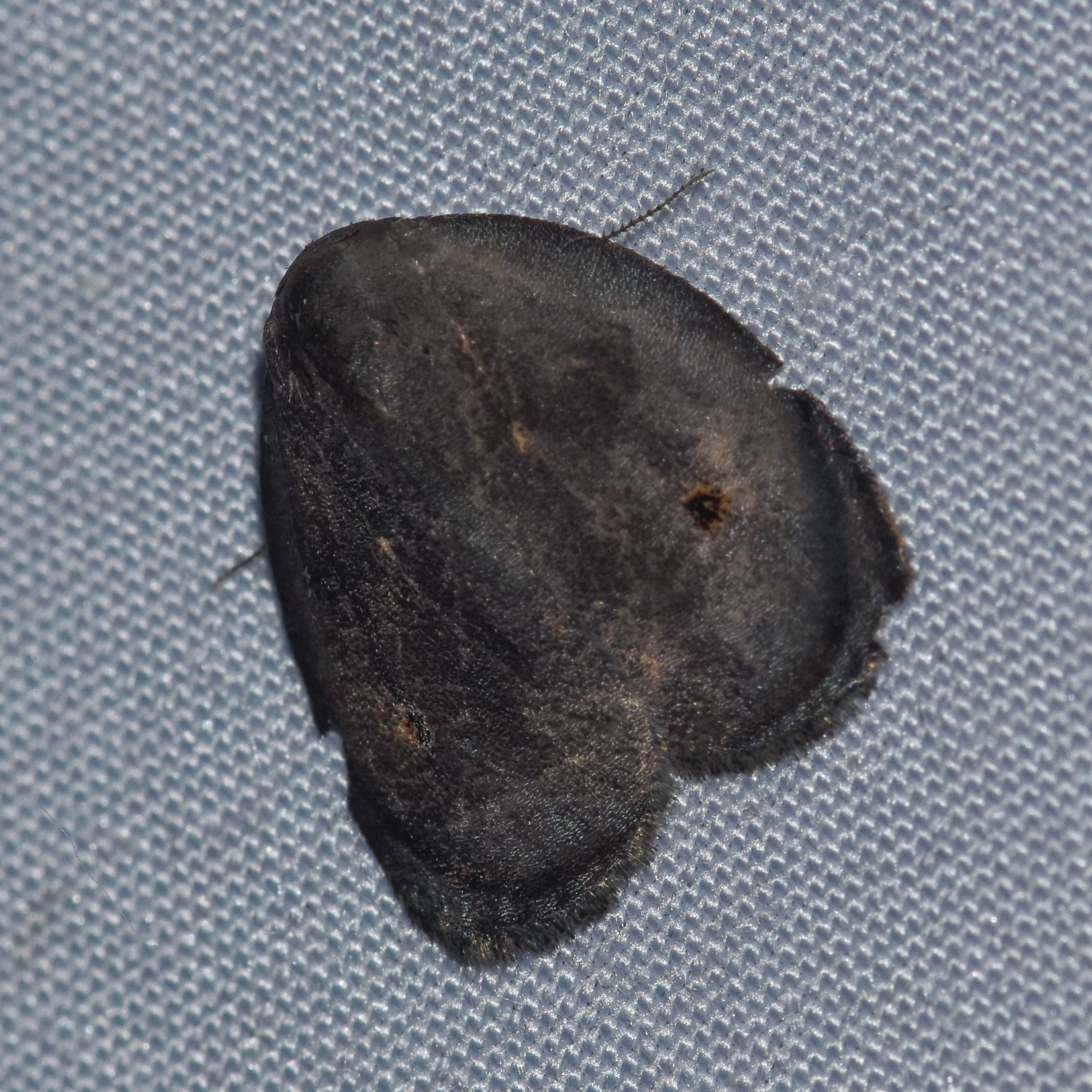

Scientific classification
- Kingdom: Animalia
- Phylum: Arthropoda
- Class: Insecta
- Order: Lepidoptera
- Superfamily: Noctuoidea
- Family: Erebidae
- Subfamily: Arctiinae
- Genus: Hemonia
- Species: H. orbiferana

Binomial name
- Hemonia orbiferana Walker, 1863

Synonyms
- Heminia orbiferana Walker, 1863; Hemonia ciliata Hampson, 1914

= Hemonia orbiferana =

Species of moth

Hemonia orbiferana is a moth of the family Erebidae. It was described by Francis Walker in 1863. It is found in Sri Lanka, India, Myanmar, Singapore, as well as on Borneo and Peninsular Malaysia.

== Description ==
Head, thorax and forewings are dark purplish grey. Forewings with a fulvous speck on an ochreous ground at end of the cell. A dark line runs from the costal center to the near apex and then curved round to the outer angle. Abdomen and hindwings pale ochreous. Bornean specimens are white.

== Ecology ==
The habitat consists of lowland forests.
