= Hemonia pallida =

Scientific classification
- Kingdom: Animalia
- Phylum: Arthropoda
- Class: Insecta
- Order: Lepidoptera
- Superfamily: Noctuoidea
- Family: Erebidae
- Subfamily: Arctiinae
- Genus: Hemonia
- Species: H. pallida

Binomial name
- Hemonia pallida Hampson, 1914

Synonyms
- Hemonia peristerodes Turner, 1940

Species of moth

Hemonia pallida is a moth of the family Erebidae. It was described by George Hampson in 1914. It is found in Australia.
