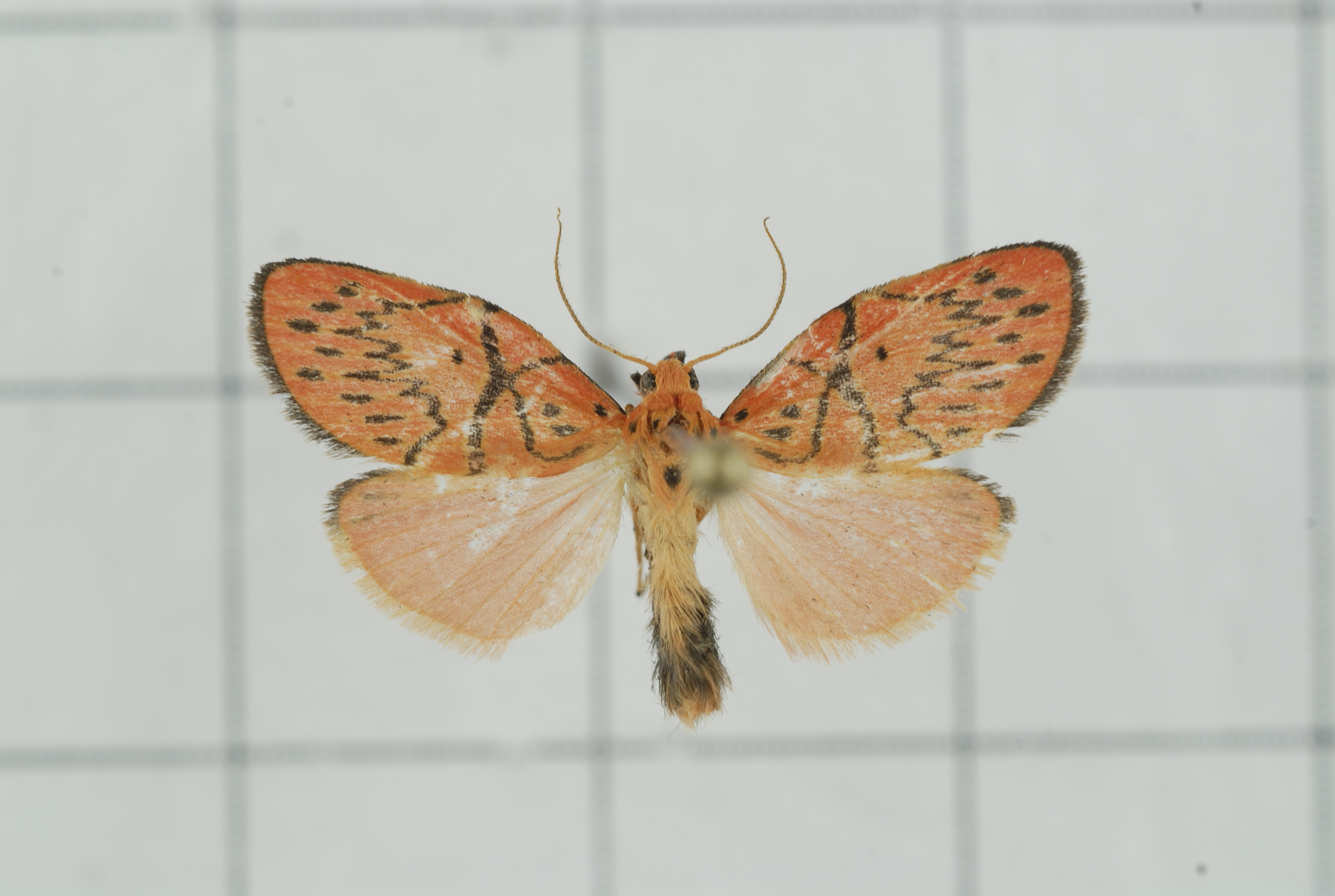
- Aberrasine lichenshihi

Scientific classification
- Kingdom: Animalia
- Phylum: Arthropoda
- Clade: Pancrustacea
- Class: Insecta
- Order: Lepidoptera
- Superfamily: Noctuoidea
- Family: Erebidae
- Subfamily: Arctiinae
- Subtribe: Nudariina
- Genus: Aberrasine; Volynkin & Huang, 2019

Type species
- Miltochrista aberrans Butler, 1877

= Aberrasine =

Genus of moths

Aberrasine is a genus of Erebid moths, first described by Volynkin and Huang in 2019.

== Species ==
- Aberrasine aberrans (Butler, 1877)
- Aberrasine atuntseensis (Daniel, 1951)
- Aberrasine collina (Černý, 2016)
- Aberrasine dingjiai (Hsu, M.-Y. Chen & Buchsbaum, 2018)
- Aberrasine honbaensis (Dubatolov & Bucsek, 2013)
- Aberrasine inaequidens (de Joannis, 1928)
- Aberrasine expressa (Inoue, 1988)
- Aberrasine lichenshihi (Wu & Kishida, 2020)
- Aberrasine nigrociliata (Fang, 1991)
- Aberrasine pangsau Singh, Kirti & Bisht, 2021
- Aberrasine peraffinis (Fang, 1991)
- Aberrasine separans (de Joannis, 1928)
- Aberrasine shiou (Wu & Kishida, 2020)
- Aberrasine sinuata (Fang, 1991)
- Aberrasine strigivenata (Hampson, 1894)
- Aberrasine tiani Zhu et al. 2022
- Aberrasine variata (Daniel, 1951)
