= Lambulosia =

Scientific classification
- Kingdom: Animalia
- Phylum: Arthropoda
- Class: Insecta
- Order: Lepidoptera
- Superfamily: Noctuoidea
- Family: Erebidae
- Subfamily: Arctiinae
- Subtribe: Nudariina
- Genus: Lambulosia; Hampson, 1914
- Species: L. aurantiaca

Binomial name
- Lambulosia aurantiaca (Rothschild, 1912)

Synonyms
- Lambula aurantiaca Rothschild, 1912; Lambulosia pallicolor Strand, 1922; Lambulosia mediosuffusa Strand, 1922

Genus of moths

Lambulosia is a monotypic moth genus in the family Erebidae erected by George Hampson in 1914. Its single species, Lambulosia aurantiaca, was first described by Walter Rothschild in 1912. It is found in Papua New Guinea.
