= Eriomastyx latus =

Scientific classification
- Domain: Eukaryota
- Kingdom: Animalia
- Phylum: Arthropoda
- Class: Insecta
- Order: Lepidoptera
- Superfamily: Noctuoidea
- Family: Erebidae
- Subfamily: Arctiinae
- Genus: Eriomastyx
- Species: E. latus

Binomial name
- Eriomastyx latus Rothschild & Jordan, 1905

Synonyms
- Teinomastyx goliathina Rothschild, 1913

Species of moth

Eriomastyx latus is a moth of the family Erebidae. It is found in New Guinea.
