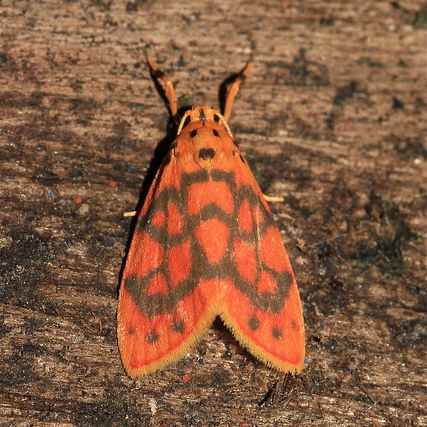

Scientific classification
- Kingdom: Animalia
- Phylum: Arthropoda
- Class: Insecta
- Order: Lepidoptera
- Superfamily: Noctuoidea
- Family: Erebidae
- Subfamily: Arctiinae
- Genus: Amphisine
- Species: A. perpusilla

Binomial name
- Amphisine perpusilla (Walker, 1862)

Synonyms
- Asura perpusilla Walker, 1862; Barsine perpusilla Walker, 1862; Hypoprepia perpusilla Walker, 1862; Asura clavula van Eecke, 1920

= Amphisine perpusilla =

Species of moth

Amphisine perpusilla is a species of moth of the family Erebidae, subfamily Arctiinae. It is found on Borneo and Sumatra. The habitat consists of dipterocarp forests and lower montane forests.
