= Barsilene =

Scientific classification
- Kingdom: Animalia
- Phylum: Arthropoda
- Clade: Pancrustacea
- Class: Insecta
- Order: Lepidoptera
- Superfamily: Noctuoidea
- Family: Erebidae
- Subfamily: Arctiinae
- Tribe: Lithosiini
- Subtribe: Nudariina
- Genus: Barsilene; Volynkin & Huang, 2019

Type species
- Barsilene pallinflexa (Holloway, 2001)

Genus of moths

Barsilene is a genus of erebid moths, first described by Volynkin & Huang in 2019.

== Species ==
- Barsilene melaninflexa (Černý, 2016)
- Barsilene pallinflexa (Holloway, 2001)
