= Delineatia mesortha =

Scientific classification
- Kingdom: Animalia
- Phylum: Arthropoda
- Class: Insecta
- Order: Lepidoptera
- Superfamily: Noctuoidea
- Family: Erebidae
- Subfamily: Arctiinae
- Genus: Delineatia
- Species: D. mesortha

Binomial name
- Delineatia mesortha (Hampson), 1898

Synonyms
- Ammatho mesortha (Hampson, 1898); Barsine mesortha (Hampson, 1898); Miltochrista mesortha Hampson, 1898

Species of moth

Delineatia mesortha is a species in the moth family Erebidae, found in southern and eastern Asia.
