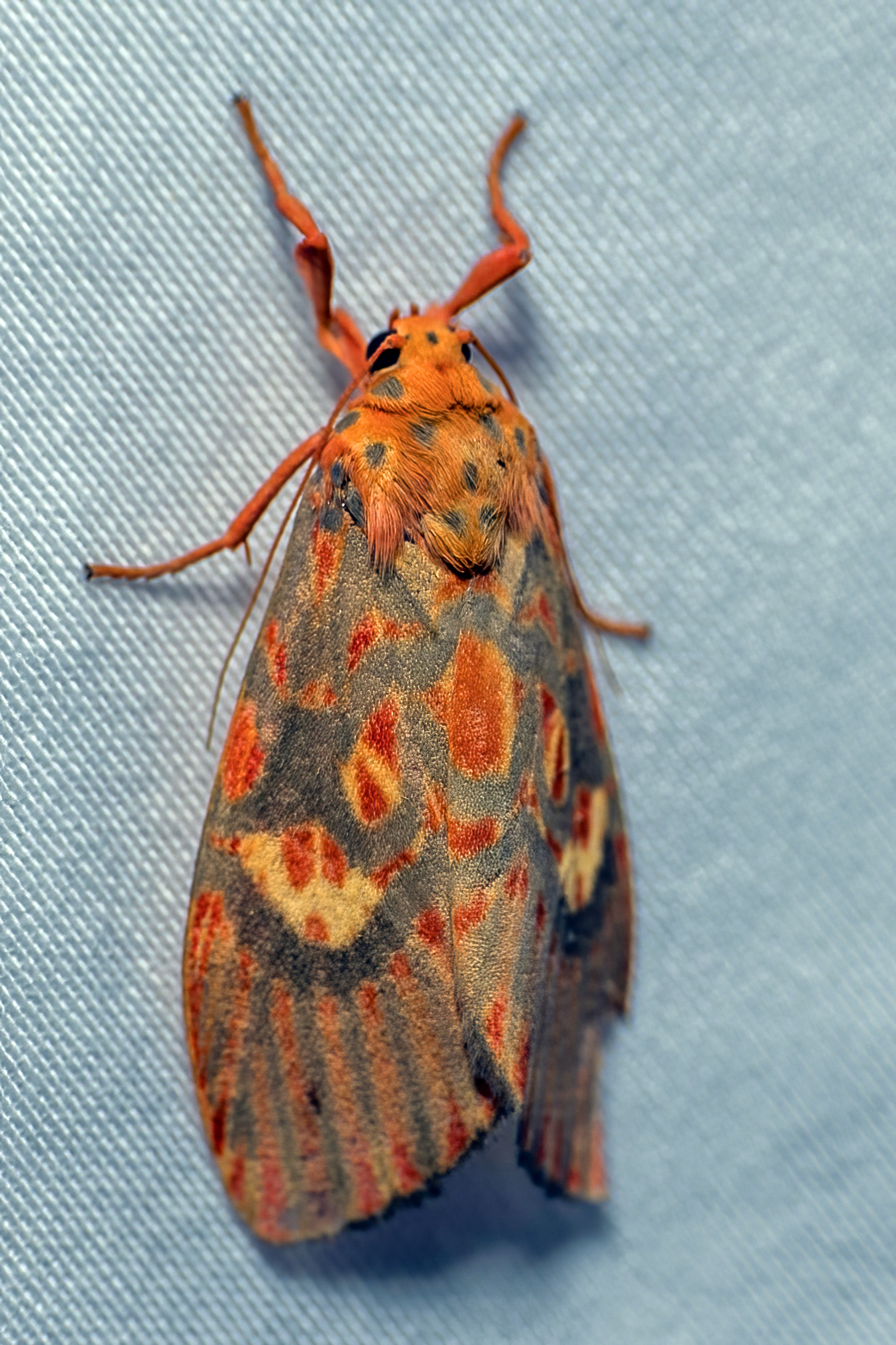

Scientific classification
- Kingdom: Animalia
- Phylum: Arthropoda
- Class: Insecta
- Order: Lepidoptera
- Superfamily: Noctuoidea
- Family: Erebidae
- Subfamily: Arctiinae
- Genus: Ammatho
- Species: A. cuneonotatus

Binomial name
- Ammatho cuneonotatus Walker, 1855

Synonyms
- Barsine cuneonotatus Moore, 1882; Miltochrista mindorana Semper, 1899; Miltochrista cuneonotata Hampson, 1900; Barsine cuneonotata Černý & Pinratana, 2009

= Ammatho cuneonotatus =

Species of moth

Ammatho cuneonotatus, the footman moth, is a moth of the subfamily Arctiinae. The species was first described by Francis Walker in 1855. It is found in Cambodia, China, Nepal, Thailand, Peninsular Malaysia and Sumatra.

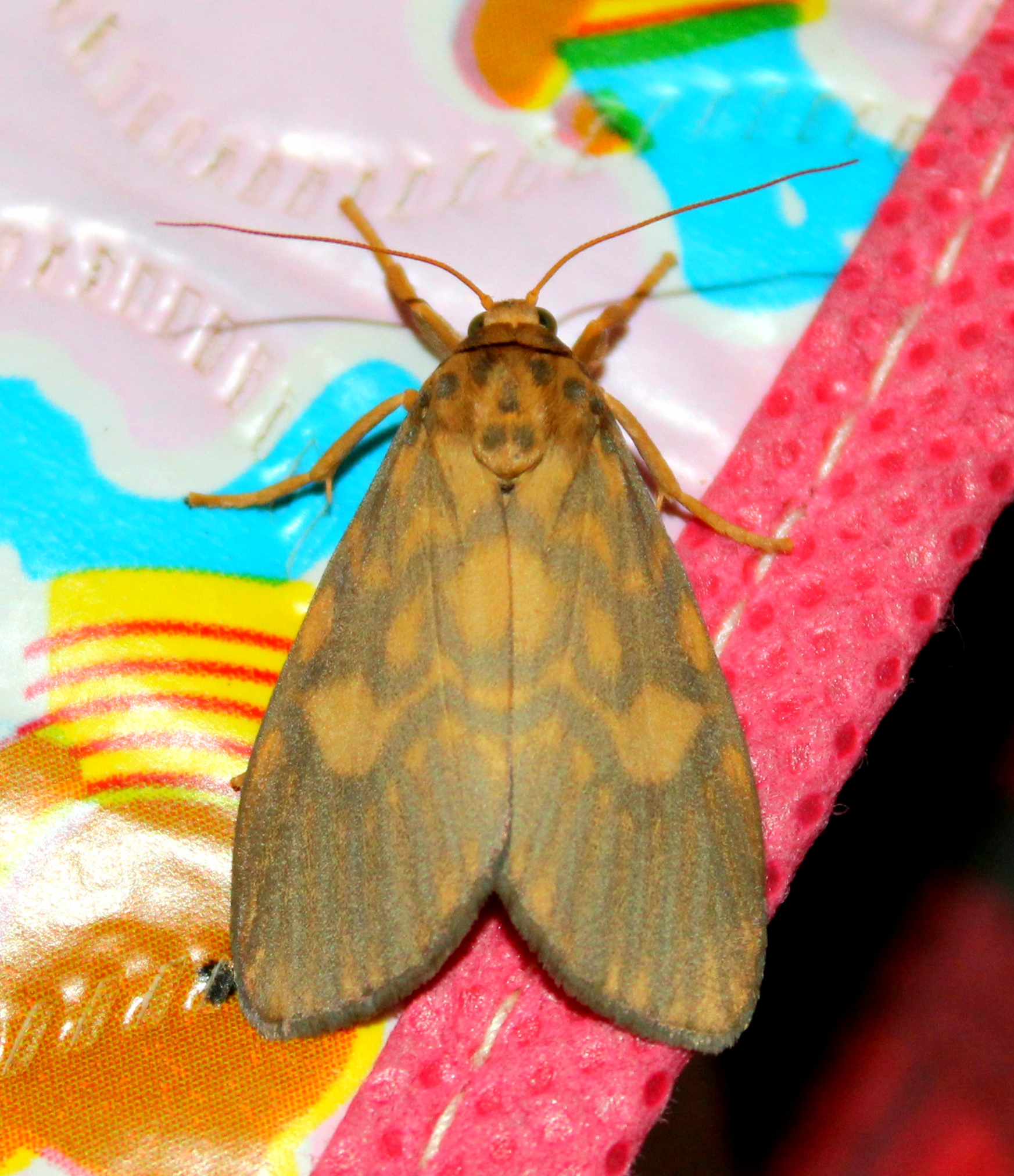
in Sri Lanka
