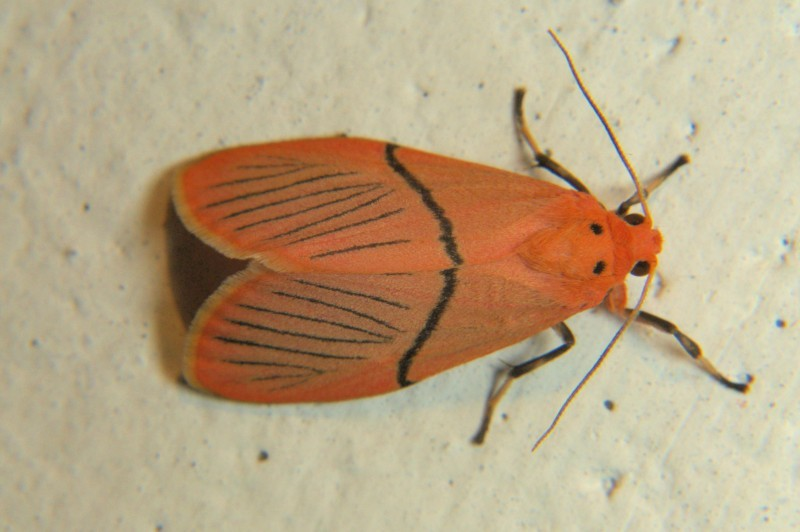
- Aberrasine strigivenata, India

Scientific classification
- Kingdom: Animalia
- Phylum: Arthropoda
- Class: Insecta
- Order: Lepidoptera
- Superfamily: Noctuoidea
- Family: Erebidae
- Subfamily: Arctiinae
- Genus: Aberrasine
- Species: A. strigivenata

Binomial name
- Aberrasine strigivenata (Hampson, 1894)

Synonyms
- Miltochrista strigivenata Hampson, 1894

= Aberrasine strigivenata =

Species of moth

Aberrasine strigivenata is a species in the moth family Erebidae, found in India and Southeast Asia.
