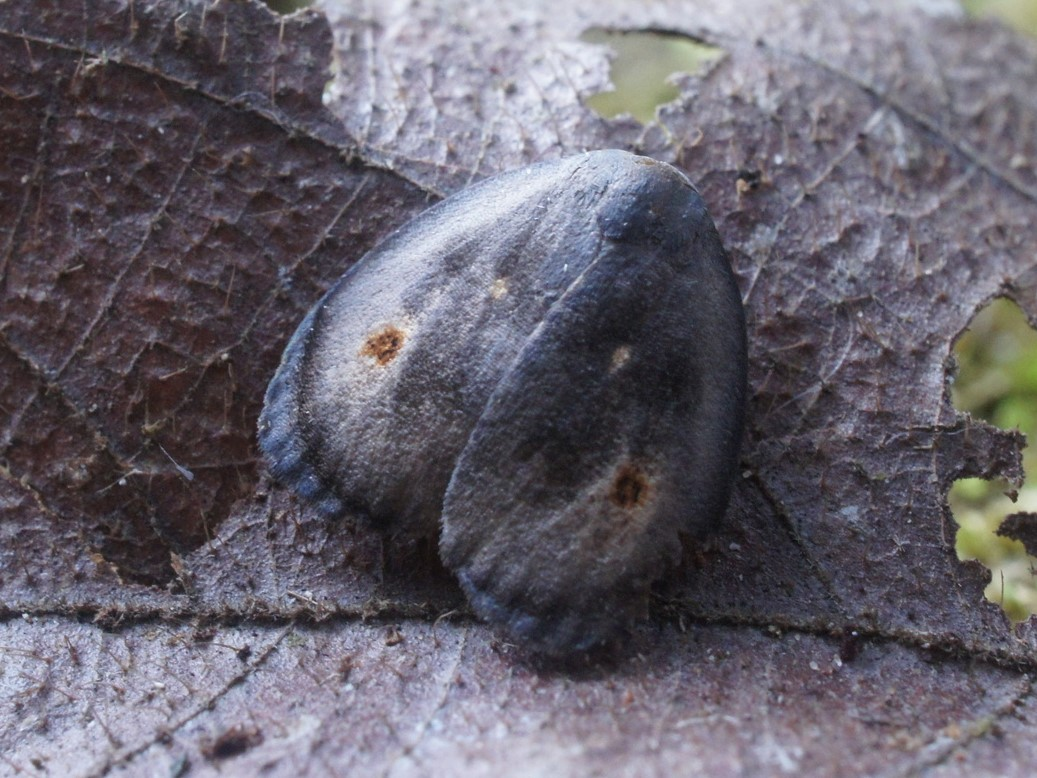

Scientific classification
- Kingdom: Animalia
- Phylum: Arthropoda
- Class: Insecta
- Order: Lepidoptera
- Superfamily: Noctuoidea
- Family: Erebidae
- Subfamily: Arctiinae
- Genus: Hemonia
- Species: H. rotundata

Binomial name
- Hemonia rotundata (Snellen, 1879)

Synonyms
- Pitane rotundata Snellen, 1879

= Hemonia rotundata =

Species of moth

Hemonia rotundata is a species of moth in the family Erebidae. It was described by Snellen in 1879. It is found on Java, Bali, Borneo, Peninsular Malaysia, the Philippines and Sulawesi. The habitat consists of primary and secondary forests.

The larvae may possibly feed on the leaves of Acacia mangium.
