= Hampsonascia dentifasciata =

Scientific classification
- Kingdom: Animalia
- Phylum: Arthropoda
- Class: Insecta
- Order: Lepidoptera
- Superfamily: Noctuoidea
- Family: Erebidae
- Subfamily: Arctiinae
- Genus: Hampsonascia
- Species: H. dentifasciata

Binomial name
- Hampsonascia dentifasciata (Hampson, 1894)

Synonyms
- Miltochrista dentifasciata Hampson, 1894; Sesapa dentifasciata (Hampson, 1894)

Species of moth

Hampsonascia dentifasciata is a species in the moth family Erebidae, found in Southeast Asia.
