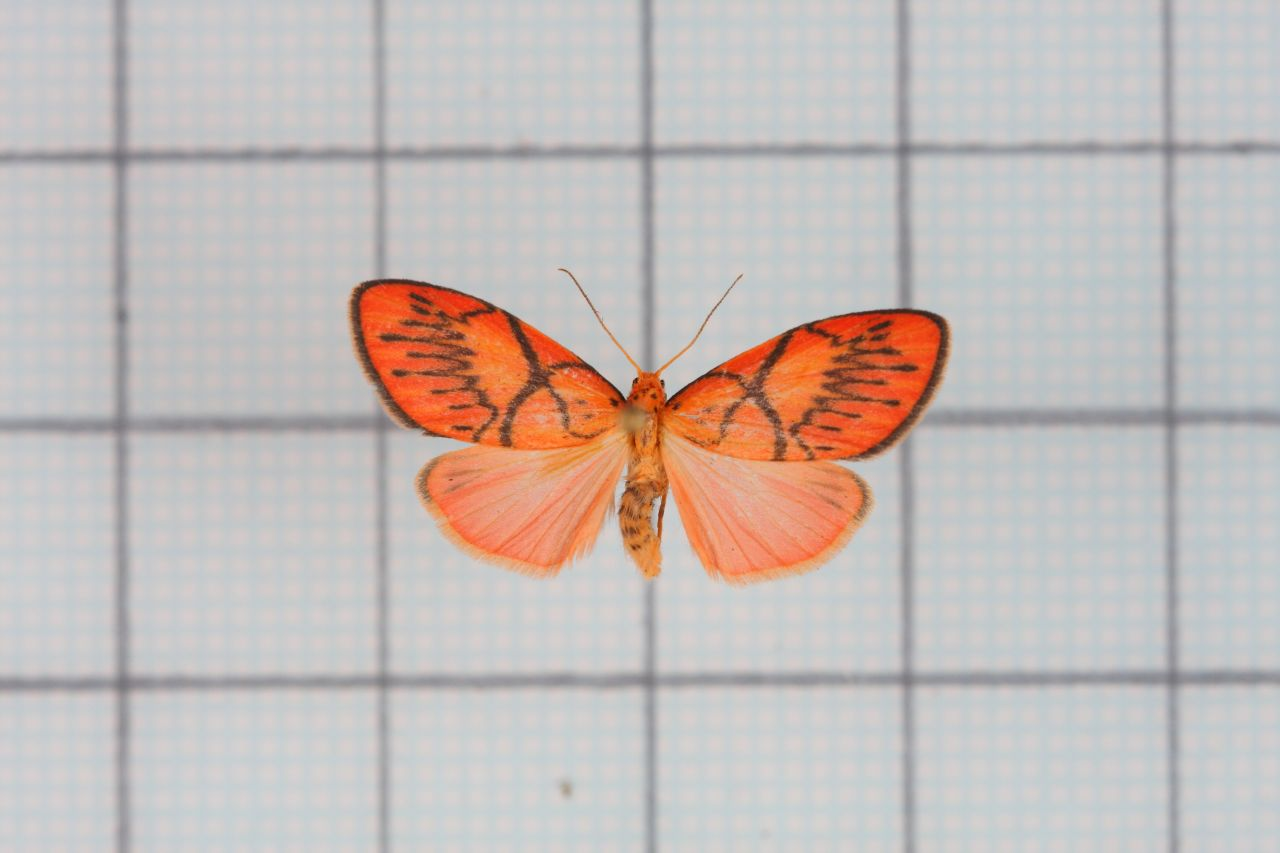

Scientific classification
- Domain: Eukaryota
- Kingdom: Animalia
- Phylum: Arthropoda
- Class: Insecta
- Order: Lepidoptera
- Superfamily: Noctuoidea
- Family: Erebidae
- Subfamily: Arctiinae
- Genus: Aberrasine
- Species: A. aberrans

Binomial name
- Aberrasine aberrans (Butler, 1877)

Synonyms
- Miltochrista aberrans Butler, 1877; Miltochrista decussata Moore, 1877; Calligenia askoldensis Oberthür, 1880

= Aberrasine aberrans =

Species of moth

Aberrasine aberrans is a moth in the family Erebidae first described by Arthur Gardiner Butler in 1877. It is found in China (Heilongjiang, Jilin, Beijing, Shaanxi, Henan, Jiangsu, Zhejiang, Jiangxi, Fujian, Hubei, Hunan, Sichuan, Guangxi, Guangdong, Hainan), Korea, Russia, Japan and Taiwan.

The wingspan is 17–26 mm. Adults are day flying and are on wing in March.

== Subspecies ==
- Miltochrista aberrans aberrans
- Miltochrista aberrans okinawana (Matsumura, 1930) (Japan)
