= Acco (moth) =

Scientific classification
- Domain: Eukaryota
- Kingdom: Animalia
- Phylum: Arthropoda
- Class: Insecta
- Order: Lepidoptera
- Superfamily: Noctuoidea
- Family: Erebidae
- Subfamily: Arctiinae
- Subtribe: Nudariina
- Genus: Acco; Bethune-Baker, 1904

Genus of moths

Acco is a genus of moths in the family Erebidae.

== Species ==
- Acco albipuncta de Vos & van Mastrigt, 2007
- Acco bicolora Bethune-Baker, 1904
- Acco fasciata de Vos & van Mastrigt, 2007
- Acco postmetallica de Vos & van Mastrigt, 2007
