= Chrysallactis =

Scientific classification
- Kingdom: Animalia
- Phylum: Arthropoda
- Class: Insecta
- Order: Lepidoptera
- Superfamily: Noctuoidea
- Family: Erebidae
- Subfamily: Arctiinae
- Subtribe: Nudariina
- Genus: Chrysallactis; Hampson, 1900

Genus of moths

Chrysallactis is a genus of moths in the family Erebidae. The genus was erected by George Hampson in 1900.

== Species ==
- Chrysallactis aureorubra Hampson, 1900
- Chrysallactis pulchra Röber, 1925
