= Eriomastyx lacteata =

Scientific classification
- Domain: Eukaryota
- Kingdom: Animalia
- Phylum: Arthropoda
- Class: Insecta
- Order: Lepidoptera
- Superfamily: Noctuoidea
- Family: Erebidae
- Subfamily: Arctiinae
- Genus: Eriomastyx
- Species: E. lacteata

Binomial name
- Eriomastyx lacteata Rothschild, 1916

Species of moth

Eriomastyx lacteata is a moth of the family Erebidae. It is found in New Guinea.
