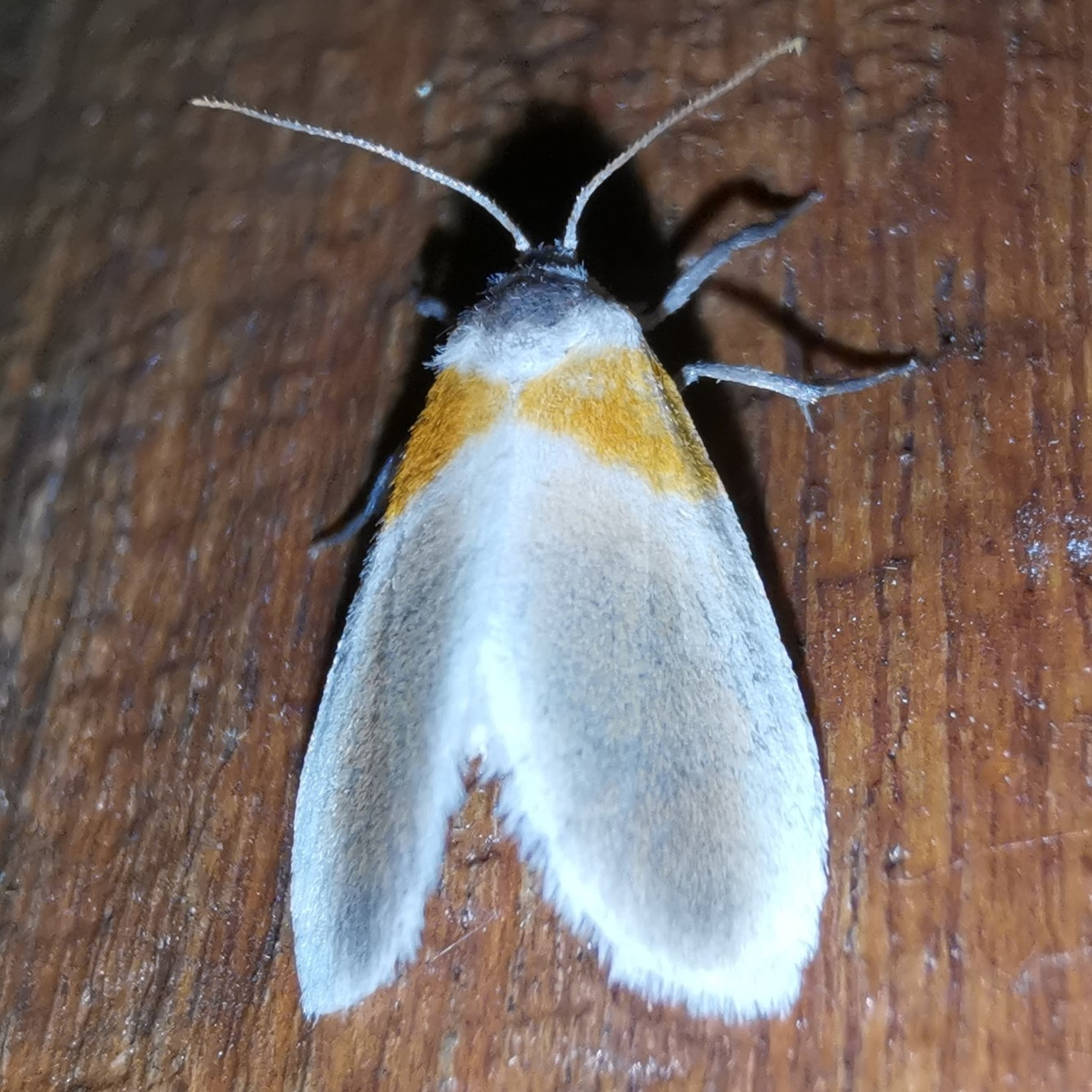

Scientific classification
- Kingdom: Animalia
- Phylum: Arthropoda
- Class: Insecta
- Order: Lepidoptera
- Superfamily: Noctuoidea
- Family: Erebidae
- Subfamily: Arctiinae
- Genus: Ovipennis
- Species: O. binghami

Binomial name
- Ovipennis binghami Hampson, 1903

= Ovipennis binghami =

Species of moth

Ovipennis binghami is a species of moth in the subfamily Arctiinae. It was described by George Hampson in 1903. It is found in Myanmar.
