= Acco postmetallica =

Scientific classification
- Domain: Eukaryota
- Kingdom: Animalia
- Phylum: Arthropoda
- Class: Insecta
- Order: Lepidoptera
- Superfamily: Noctuoidea
- Family: Erebidae
- Subfamily: Arctiinae
- Genus: Acco
- Species: A. postmetallica

Binomial name
- Acco postmetallica De Vos & van Mastrigt, 2007

Species of moth

Acco postmetallica is a moth of the family Erebidae. It was described by Rob de Vos and Henricus Jacobus Gerardus van Mastrigt in 2007. It is found in Western New Guinea, Indonesia.
