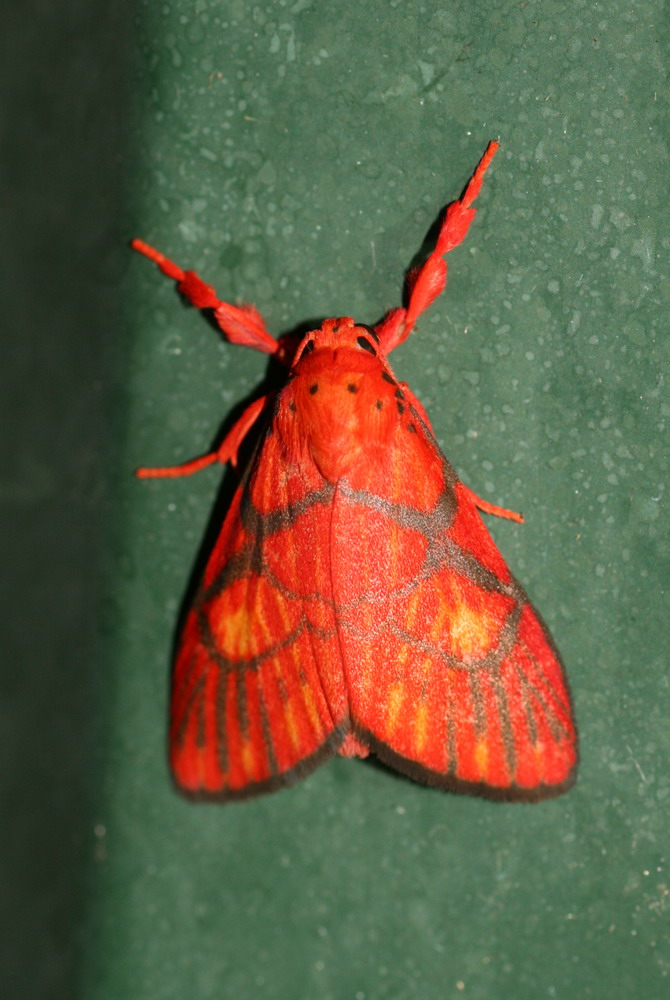

Scientific classification
- Kingdom: Animalia
- Phylum: Arthropoda
- Class: Insecta
- Order: Lepidoptera
- Superfamily: Noctuoidea
- Family: Erebidae
- Subfamily: Arctiinae
- Genus: Sarbine
- Species: S. flavodiscalis

Binomial name
- Sarbine flavodiscalis (Talbot, 1926)

Synonyms
- Miltochrista flavodiscalis Talbot, 1926; Barsine flavodiscalis (Talbot, 1926)

= Sarbine flavodiscalis =

Species of moth

Sarbine flavodiscalis is a species of moth of the family Erebidae, subfamily Arctiinae. It is endemic to Borneo, and is found in montane forests between 1,050 and 1,930 meters.
