= Nanarsine =

Scientific classification
- Kingdom: Animalia
- Phylum: Arthropoda
- Class: Insecta
- Order: Lepidoptera
- Superfamily: Noctuoidea
- Family: Erebidae
- Subfamily: Arctiinae
- Tribe: Lithosiini
- Subtribe: Nudariina
- Genus: Nanarsine; Volynkin, 2019

Type species
- Nanarsine porphyrea (Snellen, 1880)

Genus of moths

Nanarsine is a genus of erebid moths, first described by Volynkin in 2019.

== Species ==
- Nanarsine emiks (Černý, 2009)
- Nanarsine milani (Černý, 2009)
- Nanarsine porphyrea (Hampson, 1900)
- Nanarsine postalba (Fang, 1986)
- Nanarsine semilutea (Wileman, 1911)
- Nanarsine senara (Moore, 1859)
- Nanarsine sullia (Swinhoe, 1901)
