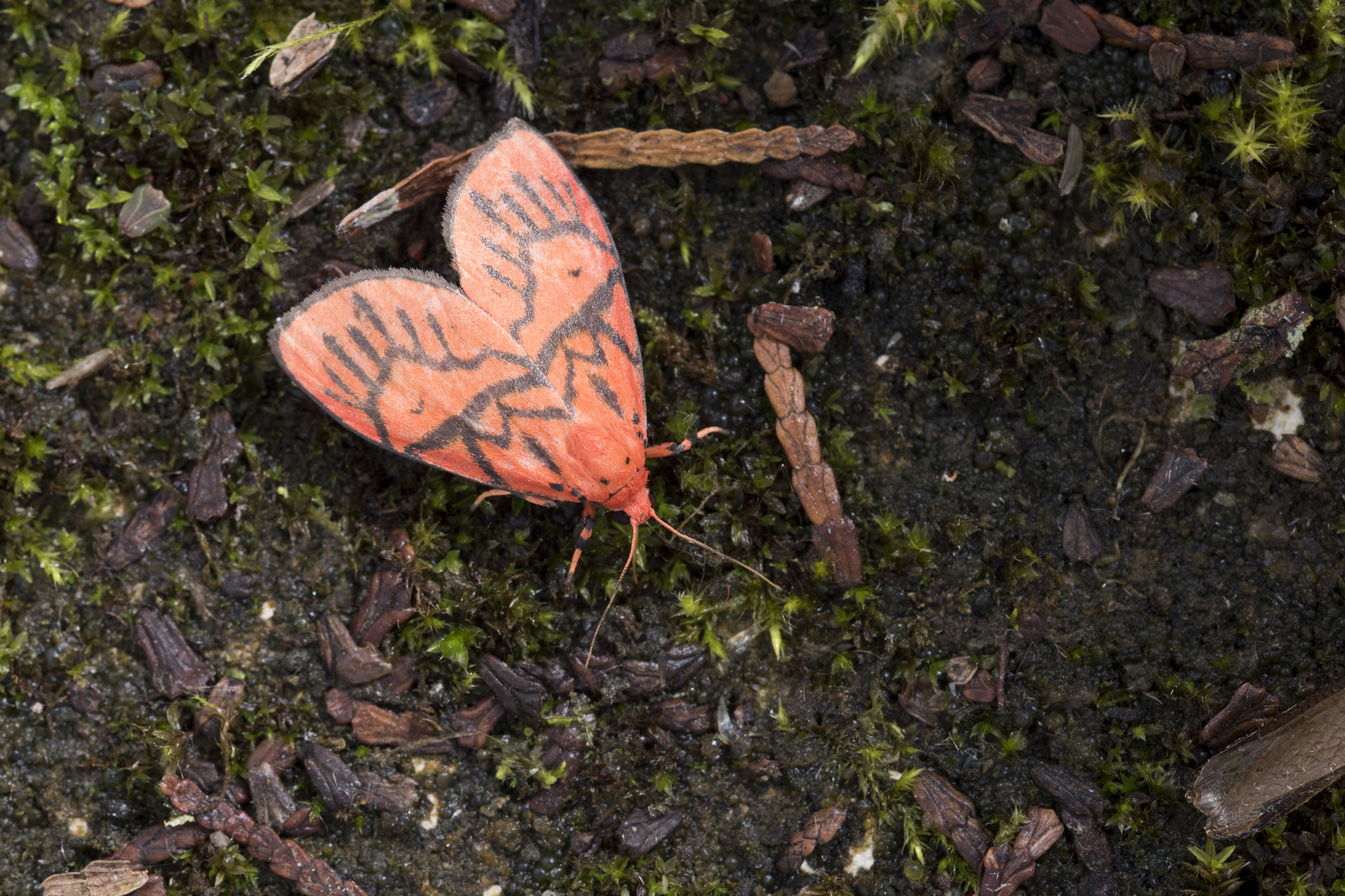
- Delineatia tairadiata, Taiwan

Scientific classification
- Kingdom: Animalia
- Phylum: Arthropoda
- Class: Insecta
- Order: Lepidoptera
- Superfamily: Noctuoidea
- Family: Erebidae
- Subfamily: Arctiinae
- Tribe: Lithosiini
- Genus: Delineatia; Volynkin & Huang, 2019

= Delineatia =

Genus of moth

Delineatia is a genus of erebid moth. It is also sometimes assigned the rank of subgenus under the genus Ammatho.

There are about seven described species in Delineatia, found in Northern Indochina, China, and Taiwan.

== Species ==
The following species are recognized in this genus:

- Delineatia delineata (Walker, 1854)
- Delineatia inexpecta (Huang & Volynkin, 2020)
- Delineatia mesortha (Hampson, 1898)
- Delineatia pseudocardinalis (Volynkin & Černý, 2017)
- Delineatia sublucana (Volynkin & Černý, 2017)
- Delineatia tairadiata (Volynkin & Wu, 2020)
- Delineatia trangchim (Volynkin & Wu, 2020)
