= Cernysura obscura =

Scientific classification
- Kingdom: Animalia
- Phylum: Arthropoda
- Class: Insecta
- Order: Lepidoptera
- Superfamily: Noctuoidea
- Family: Erebidae
- Subfamily: Arctiinae
- Genus: Cernysura
- Species: C. obscura

Binomial name
- Cernysura obscura (Semper, 1899)

Synonyms
- Miltochrista obscura Semper, 1899

Species of moth

Cernysura obscura is a species in the moth family Erebidae.
