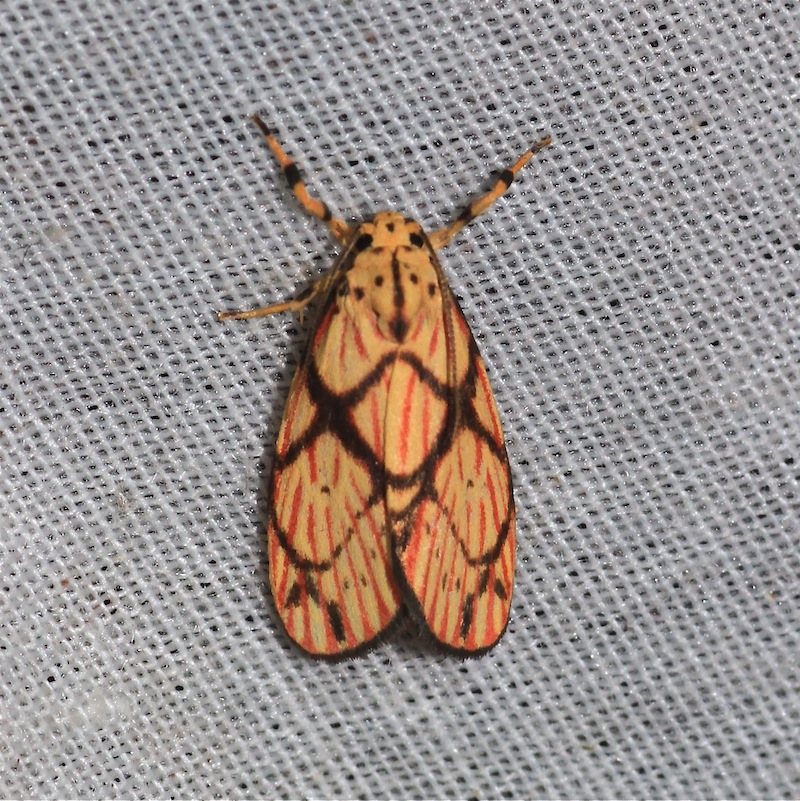

Scientific classification
- Kingdom: Animalia
- Phylum: Arthropoda
- Clade: Pancrustacea
- Class: Insecta
- Order: Lepidoptera
- Superfamily: Noctuoidea
- Family: Erebidae
- Subfamily: Arctiinae
- Genus: Barsilene
- Species: B. pallinflexa

Binomial name
- Barsilene pallinflexa (Holloway, 2001)

= Barsilene pallinflexa =

Species of moth

Barsine pallinflexa is a species of lichen-moths of the family Erebidae, subfamily Arctiinae. It is endemic to Borneo. All records are from lowland forest, including heath forest.
