= Ammathella =

Scientific classification
- Kingdom: Animalia
- Phylum: Arthropoda
- Class: Insecta
- Order: Lepidoptera
- Superfamily: Noctuoidea
- Family: Erebidae
- Subfamily: Arctiinae
- Tribe: Lithosiini
- Subtribe: Nudariina
- Genus: Ammathella; Volynkin, 2019

Genus of moths

Ammathella is a genus in the moth family Erebidae. There are at least four described species in Ammathella, found in northeastern India and North Myanmar.

== Species ==
These four species belong to the genus Ammathella:

- Ammathella garo (Volynkin, 2018)
- Ammathella gesar (Huang & Volynkin, 2020)
- Ammathella midzhan (Volynkin, 2018)
- Ammathella shingwa (Huang & Volynkin, 2020)
