= Crocodeta =

Scientific classification
- Kingdom: Animalia
- Phylum: Arthropoda
- Class: Insecta
- Order: Lepidoptera
- Superfamily: Noctuoidea
- Family: Erebidae
- Subfamily: Arctiinae
- Subtribe: Nudariina
- Genus: Crocodeta; Hampson, 1914

Genus of moths

Crocodeta is a genus of moths in the family Erebidae. The genus was erected by George Hampson in 1914.

== Species ==
- Crocodeta erecta Gaede, 1925
- Crocodeta variegata (Rothschild, 1913)
