= Celamodes =

Scientific classification
- Domain: Eukaryota
- Kingdom: Animalia
- Phylum: Arthropoda
- Class: Insecta
- Order: Lepidoptera
- Superfamily: Noctuoidea
- Family: Erebidae
- Subfamily: Arctiinae
- Subtribe: Nudariina
- Genus: Celamodes; Hampson, 1914
- Species: C. rufotincta

Binomial name
- Celamodes rufotincta (Rothschild, 1912)

Synonyms
- Manoba rufotincta Rothschild, 1912

Genus of moths

Celamodes is a monotypic moth genus in the family Erebidae erected by George Hampson in 1914. Its only species, Celamodes rufotincta, was first described by Walter Rothschild in 1912. It is found in New Guinea.
