= Micronyctemera =

Scientific classification
- Domain: Eukaryota
- Kingdom: Animalia
- Phylum: Arthropoda
- Class: Insecta
- Order: Lepidoptera
- Superfamily: Noctuoidea
- Family: Erebidae
- Subfamily: Arctiinae
- Subtribe: Nudariina
- Genus: Micronyctemera de Vos & van Mastrigt, 2007
- Species: M. fojaensis

Binomial name
- Micronyctemera fojaensis de Vos & van Mastrigt, 2007

Genus of moths

Micronyctemera is a genus of moths in the family Erebidae. It contains only one species, Micronyctemera fojaensis, which is found in Papua.
