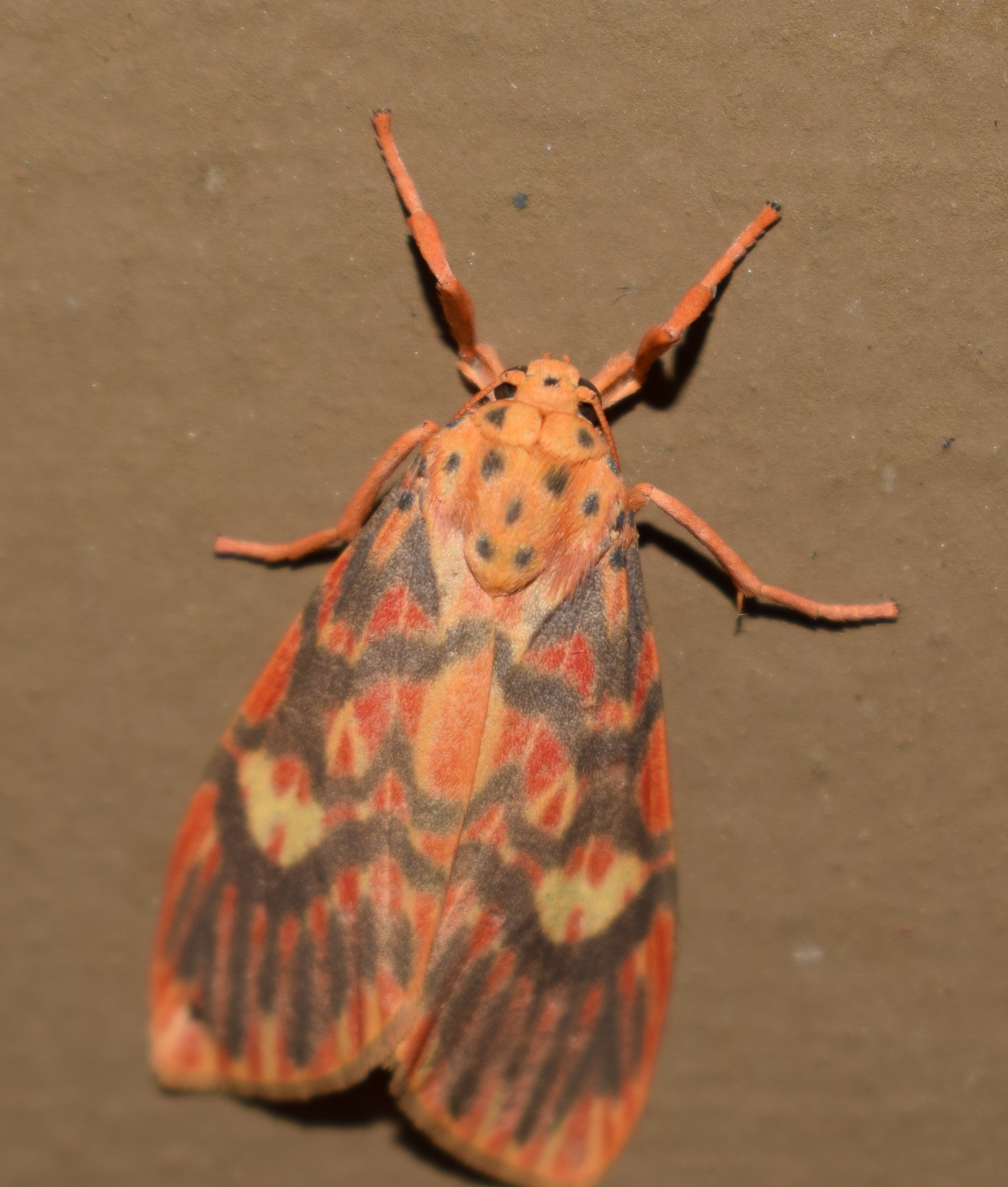
- Ammatho cuneonotatus, India

Scientific classification
- Kingdom: Animalia
- Phylum: Arthropoda
- Class: Insecta
- Order: Lepidoptera
- Superfamily: Noctuoidea
- Family: Erebidae
- Subfamily: Arctiinae
- Tribe: Lithosiini
- Subtribe: Nudariina
- Genus: Ammatho; Walker, 1855

Type species
- Ammatho cuneonotatus Walker, 1855

Subgenera
- Ammatho Walker, 1855; Rugosine Volynkin, 2019

= Ammatho =

Genus of moths

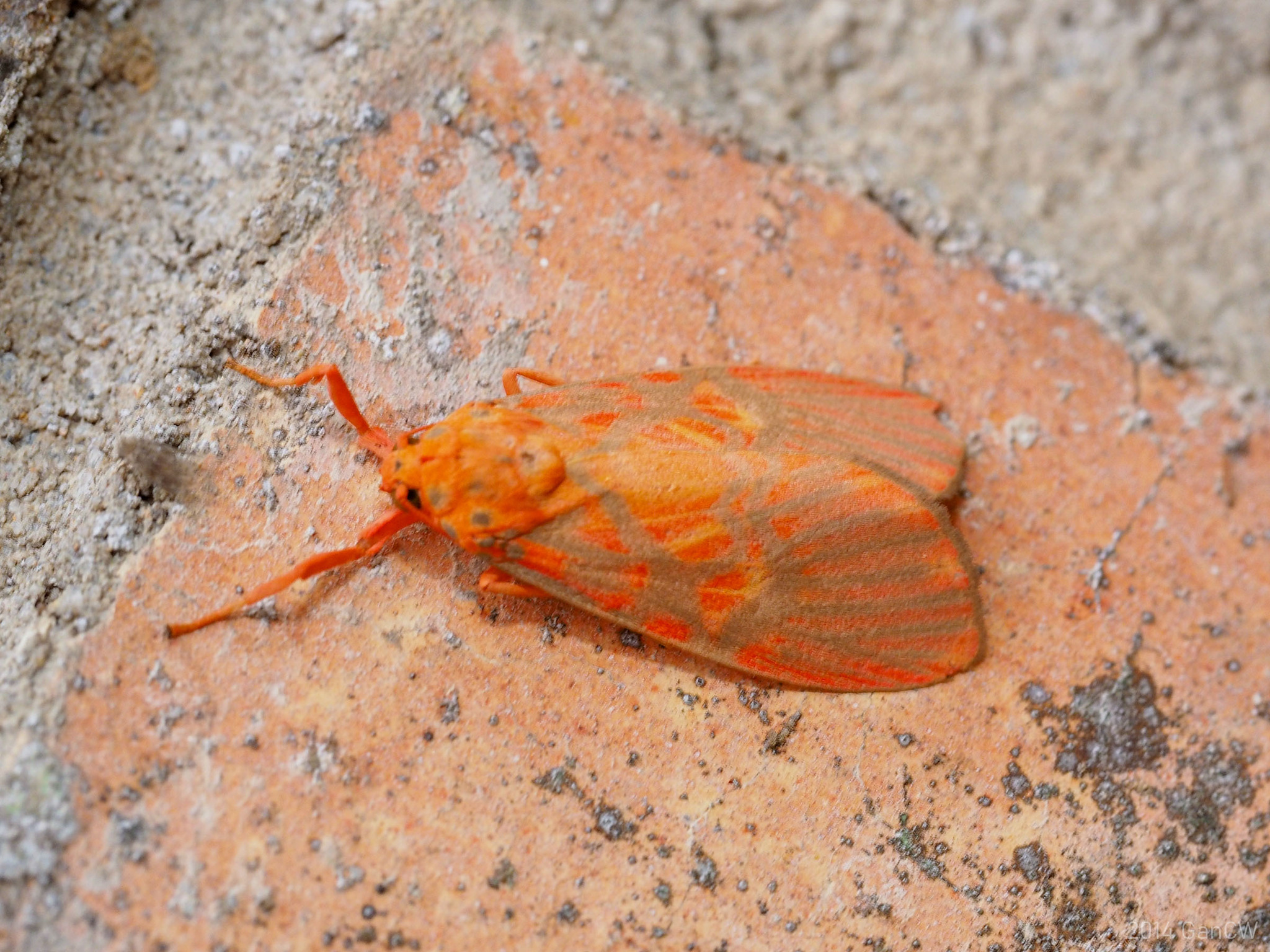
Ammatho roseororatus, Malaysia

Ammatho is a genus in the moth family Erebidae. There are about 15 described species in Ammatho, found in South and Southeast Asia.

Ammatho formerly consisted of more than 75 species in 8 subgenera, but as a result of molecular phylogenetic research, most of the subgenera were elevated to genus rank and all but 15 of the species were moved the new genera.

This genus was first described by Francis Walker in 1855.

== Species ==
These 15 species belong to the genus Ammatho:

- Ammatho bornescripta (Holloway, 2001)
- Ammatho carbonisata (Černý, 1995)
- Ammatho celebesa (Tams, 1935)
- Ammatho collivolans (Butler, 1881)
- Ammatho cruenia (Hampson, 1918)
- Ammatho cuneonotatus Walker, 1855
- Ammatho cuneorotatus N. Singh & Kirti, 2016
- Ammatho dohertyi (Rothschild, 1913)
- Ammatho duopunctata (Semper, 1899)
- Ammatho erythropoda (Roepke, 1946)
- Ammatho flavoplagiata (Rothschild, 1913)
- Ammatho roseororatus Butler, 1877
- Ammatho salakia (Schaus, 1922)
- Ammatho sanguitincta (Hampson, 1900)
- Ammatho scripta (Walker, 1864)
