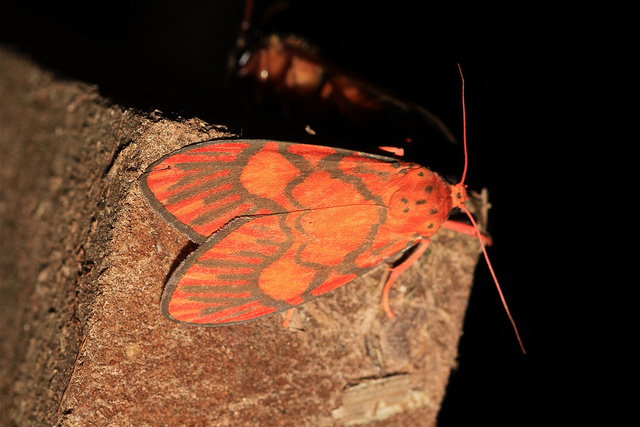

Scientific classification
- Domain: Eukaryota
- Kingdom: Animalia
- Phylum: Arthropoda
- Class: Insecta
- Order: Lepidoptera
- Superfamily: Noctuoidea
- Family: Erebidae
- Subfamily: Arctiinae
- Genus: Barsine
- Species: B. roseororatus

Binomial name
- Barsine roseororatus (Butler, 1877)

Synonyms
- Ammatho roseororatus Butler, 1877; Miltochrista dohertyi Rothschild sensu Holloway, 1976 [misidentification]

= Barsine roseororatus =

Species of moth

Barsine roseororatus is a species of moth of the family Erebidae, subfamily Arctiinae. It is found in Peninsular Malaysia and Borneo. It has also been recorded as a millet pest in India. This is a frequent species that is found in forested and disturbed habitats in the lowlands and more rarely up to about 2000 meters.
