= Graptasura =

Scientific classification
- Kingdom: Animalia
- Phylum: Arthropoda
- Class: Insecta
- Order: Lepidoptera
- Superfamily: Noctuoidea
- Family: Erebidae
- Subfamily: Arctiinae
- Genus: Graptasura; Hampson, 1900

Genus of moths

Graptasura is a genus of moths in the subfamily Arctiinae. The genus was erected by George Hampson in 1900.

== Species ==
- Graptasura polygrapha (Felder, 1874)
- Graptasura trilacunata Holloway, 2001
- Graptasura mesilau Holloway, 2001
