= Argentosine =

Scientific classification
- Kingdom: Animalia
- Phylum: Arthropoda
- Class: Insecta
- Order: Lepidoptera
- Superfamily: Noctuoidea
- Family: Erebidae
- Subfamily: Arctiinae
- Tribe: Lithosiini
- Genus: Argentosine; Volynkin, Huang & Ivanova, 2019
- Species: A. proleuca

Binomial name
- Argentosine proleuca (Hampson, 1900)

Synonyms
- Miltochrista proleuca Hampson, 1900

Genus of moths

Argentosine is a genus in the moth family Erebidae. This genus has a single species, Argentosine proleuca, found in Nepal and northeastern India.
