= Cyclomilta =

Scientific classification
- Kingdom: Animalia
- Phylum: Arthropoda
- Class: Insecta
- Order: Lepidoptera
- Superfamily: Noctuoidea
- Family: Erebidae
- Subfamily: Arctiinae
- Tribe: Lithosiini
- Genus: Cyclomilta; Hampson, 1900

Genus of moths

Cyclomilta is a genus of moths in the subfamily Arctiinae. The genus was erected by George Hampson in 1900.

== Species ==
- Cyclomilta cambodiaca Dubatolov & Bucsek, 2013 Cambodia
- Cyclomilta fangchenglaiae Dubatolov, Kishida & Wang, 2012 Guangdong province of China
- Cyclomilta melanolepia (Dudgeon, 1900) Sikkim state of India
- Cyclomilta ravus Bucsek, 2012 Malaysia
