= Cernysura =

Scientific classification
- Kingdom: Animalia
- Phylum: Arthropoda
- Class: Insecta
- Order: Lepidoptera
- Superfamily: Noctuoidea
- Family: Erebidae
- Subfamily: Arctiinae
- Tribe: Lithosiini
- Genus: Cernysura; Volynkin, 2019

Genus of moths

Cernysura is a genus of erebid moths. There are about four described species in Cernysura, endemic to the Philippines.

== Species ==
The following species are recognized in this genus:

- Cernysura crucipuncta (Černý, 1995)
- Cernysura lenticulata (Černý, 1995)
- Cernysura obscura (Semper, 1899)
- Cernysura orbis (Černý, 1995)
