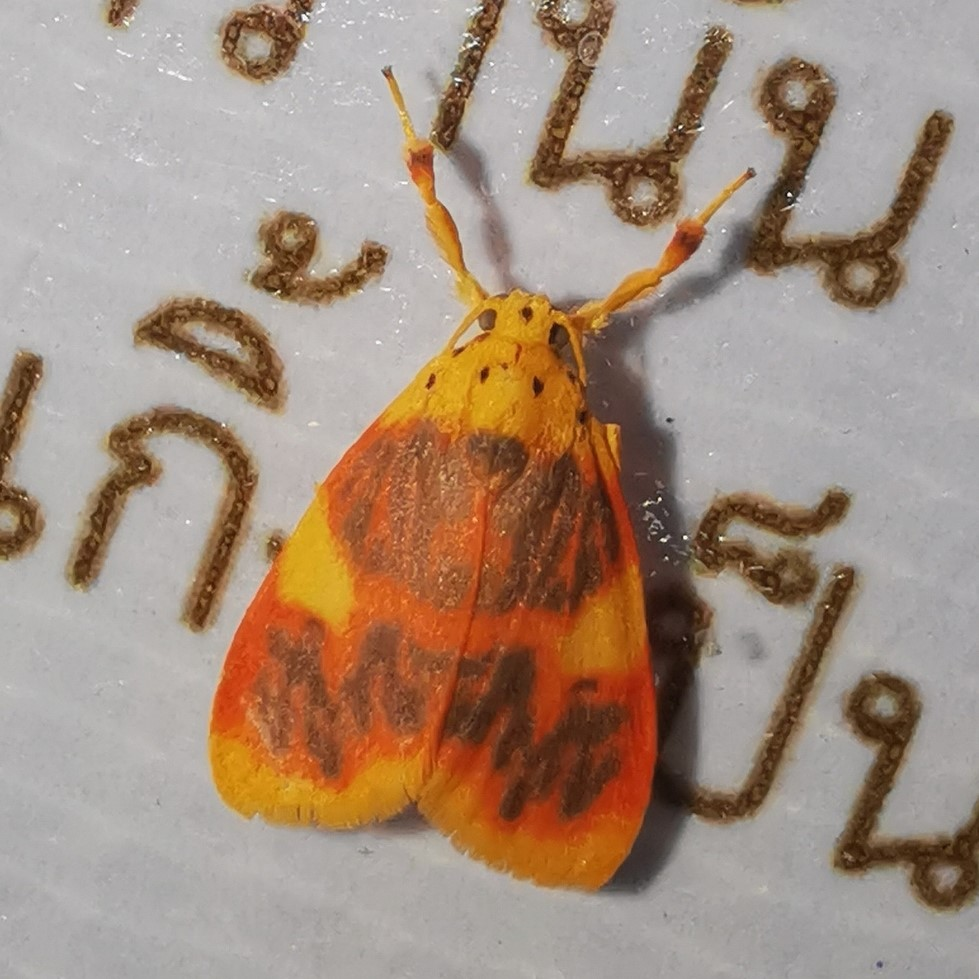
- Ovipennis insolita

Scientific classification
- Kingdom: Animalia
- Phylum: Arthropoda
- Class: Insecta
- Order: Lepidoptera
- Superfamily: Noctuoidea
- Family: Erebidae
- Subfamily: Arctiinae
- Tribe: Lithosiini
- Genus: Ovipennis; Hampson, 1900

= Ovipennis =

Genus of moths

Ovipennis is a genus of moths in the subfamily Arctiinae. The genus was erected by George Hampson in 1900.

== Species ==
The following species are recognised in the genus Ovipennis:

- Ovipennis bicolora Fang, 1986
- Ovipennis binghami Hampson, 1903
- Ovipennis connexa (Wileman, 1910)
- Ovipennis dudgeoni (Elwes, 1890)
- Ovipennis insolita (Volynkin, Černý, Bayarsaikhan & Bae, 2019)
- Ovipennis milani (Černý, 2009)
- Ovipennis mixta Huang, Zhao, Volynkin & Han, 2022
- Ovipennis multicornuta Huang, Zhao, Volynkin & Han, 2022
- Ovipennis postalba Fang, 1986
- Ovipennis semilutea (Wileman, 1911)
- Ovipennis thomasi Černý, 2009
