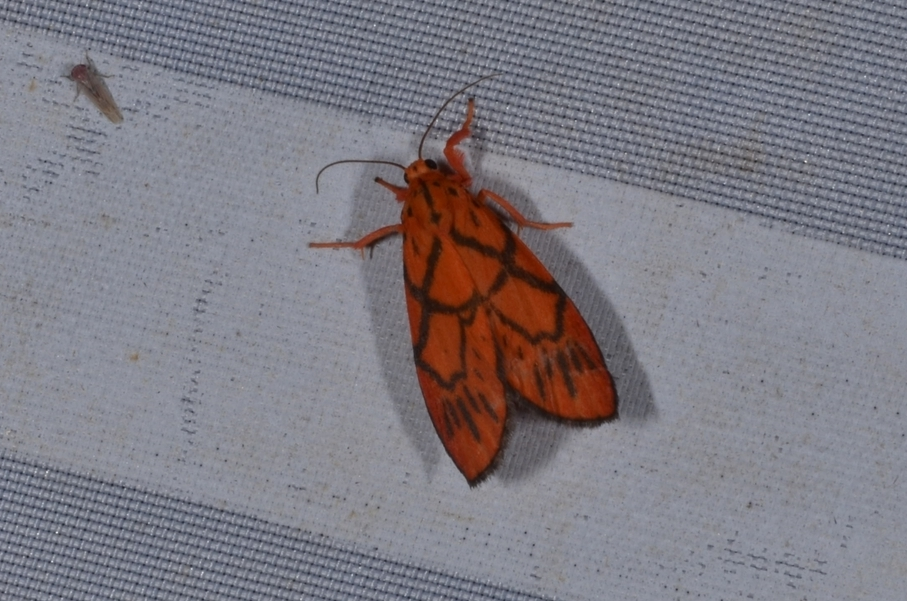
- Fossia bachma, Vietnam

Scientific classification
- Kingdom: Animalia
- Phylum: Arthropoda
- Class: Insecta
- Order: Lepidoptera
- Superfamily: Noctuoidea
- Family: Erebidae
- Subfamily: Arctiinae
- Tribe: Lithosiini
- Genus: Fossia; Volynkin, Ivanova & Huang, 2019

= Fossia =

Genus of moths

Fossia is a genus in the moth family Erebidae. There are about five described species in Fossia, widespread in the Himalayan region, western and southern China, and Indochina.

== Species ==
These five species belong to the genus Fossia:

- Fossia bachma (Volynkin & Černý, 2018)
- Fossia elongata (Černý, 2016)
- Fossia melanandra (Černý & Pinratana, 2009)
- Fossia punicea (Moore, 1878)
- Fossia sirikitae (Volynkin & Černý, 2018)
