= Rubrindiania =

Scientific classification
- Kingdom: Animalia
- Phylum: Arthropoda
- Class: Insecta
- Order: Lepidoptera
- Superfamily: Noctuoidea
- Family: Erebidae
- Subfamily: Arctiinae
- Tribe: Lithosiini
- Genus: Rubrindiania; Volynkin & Huang, 2019
- Species: R. cardinalis

Binomial name
- Rubrindiania cardinalis (Hampson, 1900)

Synonyms
- Miltochrista cardinalis Hampson, 1900

Species of moth

Rubrindiania cardinalis is a species of moth in the family Erebidae. It is found in southern Asia. This is the only species in the genus Rubrindiania.

== Subspecies ==
These two subspecies belong to the species Rubrindiania cardinalis:

- Rubrindiania cardinalis cardinalis (Hampson, 1900)
- Rubrindiania cardinalis gemina (Volynkin & Černý, 2017)
