= Barsaurea =

Scientific classification
- Kingdom: Animalia
- Phylum: Arthropoda
- Class: Insecta
- Order: Lepidoptera
- Superfamily: Noctuoidea
- Family: Erebidae
- Subfamily: Arctiinae
- Tribe: Lithosiini
- Genus: Barsaurea; Volynkin & Huang, 2019

Genus of moths

Barsaurea is a genus in the moth family Erebidae. There are at least four described species in Barsaurea, widely distributed from northeastern India to Southeast Asia.

== Species ==
These four species belong to the genus Barsaurea:

- Barsaurea apatani S. Singh, Kirti & N. Singh, 2023
- Barsaurea diehli (Dubatolov & Bucsek, 2014)
- Barsaurea ketiga Volynkin, Černý & Huang, 2020
- Barsaurea phaeoxanthia (Hampson, 1900)
