= Hampsonascia =

Scientific classification
- Kingdom: Animalia
- Phylum: Arthropoda
- Class: Insecta
- Order: Lepidoptera
- Superfamily: Noctuoidea
- Family: Erebidae
- Subfamily: Arctiinae
- Tribe: Lithosiini
- Genus: Hampsonascia; Volynkin, 2019

Genus of moth

Hampsonascia is a genus of erebid moths.

== Species ==
The following species are recognized in this genus:

- Hampsonascia aulaca Volynkin & Černý, 2021
- Hampsonascia dentifasciata (Hampson, 1894)
- Hampsonascia phukha Volynkin & Černý, 2021
- Hampsonascia saldaitisi Volynkin & Černý, 2021
- Hampsonascia thaifascia Volynkin & Černý, 2021
- Hampsonascia vanlanga Volynkin & Černý, 2021
