= Composine =

Scientific classification
- Kingdom: Animalia
- Phylum: Arthropoda
- Class: Insecta
- Order: Lepidoptera
- Superfamily: Noctuoidea
- Family: Erebidae
- Subfamily: Arctiinae
- Tribe: Lithosiini
- Genus: Composine; Volynkin, 2019
- Species: C. complicata

Binomial name
- Composine complicata (Butler, 1877)

Genus of moths

Composine is a genus in the moth family Erebidae. This genus has a single species, Composine complicata, found in the Sundaland region of Southeast Asia.
