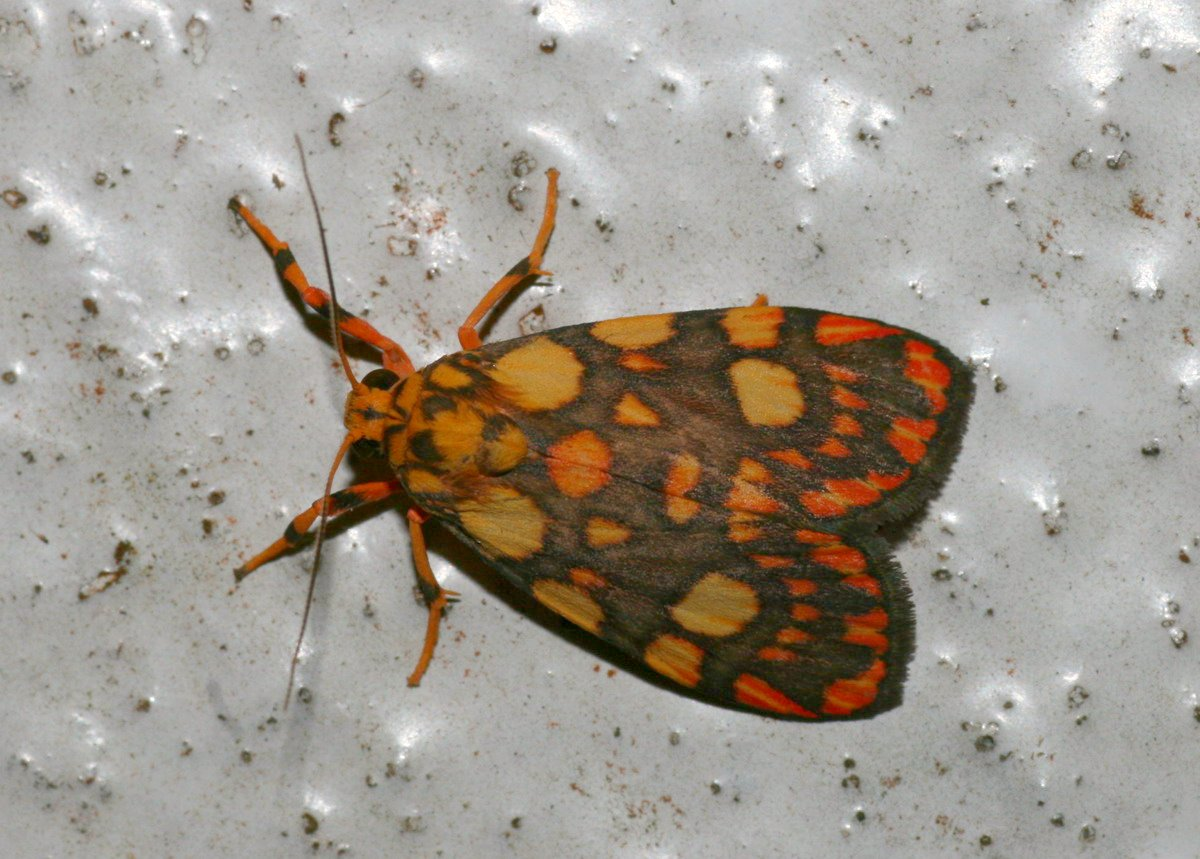
- Lyclene reticulata

Scientific classification
- Domain: Eukaryota
- Kingdom: Animalia
- Phylum: Arthropoda
- Class: Insecta
- Order: Lepidoptera
- Superfamily: Noctuoidea
- Family: Erebidae
- Subfamily: Arctiinae
- Subtribe: Nudariina
- Genus: Lyclene; Moore, [1860]

Synonyms
- Cyllene Walker, 1854; Cymella Felder, 1874; Setinochroa Felder, 1874; Xanthocraspeda Hampson, 1894; Myclela Watson, 1980

= Lyclene =

Genus of moths

Lyclene is a genus of lichen moths of the family Erebidae, subfamily Arctiinae. The genus was erected by Frederic Moore in 1860.

== Taxonomy ==
The genus is closely allied to Asura or Barsine and various of species are alternatively placed under these genera.

== Species ==
- Lyclene acteola (Swinhoe, 1903)
- Lyclene acutiseriata Holloway, 2001
- Lyclene angulifera Holloway, 2001
- Lyclene angulinea Holloway, 2001
- Lyclene apiseriata Holloway, 2001
- Lyclene areolifera Holloway, 2001
- Lyclene ashleigera Holloway, 2001
- Lyclene circumdata (Walker, [1865])
- Lyclene classeigera Holloway, 2001
- Lyclene distributa Walker, 1862
- Lyclene excaviseriata Holloway, 2001
- Lyclene falciseriata Holloway, 2001
- Lyclene fusciramorum Holloway, 2001
- Lyclene goaensis Kirti & Gill, 2009
- Lyclene hollowai Kirti & Gill, 2009
- Lyclene kepica Dubatolov & Bucsek, 2013
- Lyclene kishidai Kirti & Gill, 2009
- Lyclene kontumica Dubatolov & Bucsek, 2013
- Lyclene kosterini Dubatolov & Bucsek, 2013
- Lyclene mesilaulinea Holloway, 2001
- Lyclene multiramorum Holloway, 2001
- Lyclene obscurilinea Holloway, 2001
- Lyclene obtusilinea Holloway, 2001
- Lyclene poring Holloway, 2001
- Lyclene postseriata Holloway, 2001
- Lyclene pseudobunda Holloway, 2001
- Lyclene pudibunda (Snellen, 1880)
- Lyclene quadrata Holloway, 2001
- Lyclene reticulata (C. Felder, 1861)
- Lyclene structa (Walker, 1854)
- Lyclene uncalis Kirti & Gill, 2009
- Lyclene unguifera Holloway, 2001
- Lyclene weidenhofferi Černý, 2012
- Lyclene xanthopera (Hampson, 1907)
- Lyclene zinchenkoi Dubatolov & Bucsek, 2013

== Formerly placed here ==
- Lyclene arcuata
- Lyclene artocarpi
- Lyclene asaphes
- Lyclene assamica
- Lyclene biseriata
- Lyclene calamaria
- Lyclene congerens
- Lyclene creatina
- Lyclene cuneifera
- Lyclene cuneigera
- Lyclene delicata
- Lyclene dharma
- Lyclene discistriga
- Lyclene eldola
- Lyclene floccosa
- Lyclene fruhstorferi
- Lyclene fuscalis
- Lyclene humilis
- Lyclene ila
- Lyclene inconspicua
- Lyclene indistincta
- Lyclene infumata
- Lyclene interserta
- Lyclene luzonica
- Lyclene marginata
- Lyclene obliqua
- Lyclene obliquilinea
- Lyclene obsoleta
- Lyclene palmata
- Lyclene peloa
- Lyclene prominens
- Lyclene pyraula
- Lyclene quadrilineata
- Lyclene radians
- Lyclene rubricosa
- Lyclene ruptifascia
- Lyclene scripta
- Lyclene semicirculata
- Lyclene semifascia
- Lyclene serratilinea
- Lyclene simplifascia
- Lyclene strigipennis
- Lyclene suffusa
- Lyclene undulosa
- Lyclene varians
- Lyclene zebrina
