= Cyme basitesselata =

Scientific classification
- Domain: Eukaryota
- Kingdom: Animalia
- Phylum: Arthropoda
- Class: Insecta
- Order: Lepidoptera
- Superfamily: Noctuoidea
- Family: Erebidae
- Subfamily: Arctiinae
- Tribe: Lithosiini
- Subtribe: Nudariina
- Genus: Cyme
- Species: C. basitesselata

Binomial name
- Cyme basitesselata (Rothschild, 1913)

Synonyms
- Asura basitesselata Rothschild, 1913; Asura basitessellata Rothschild, 1913

Species of moth

Cyme basitesselata is a moth of the subfamily Arctiinae.

== Taxonomy ==
It was originally described as Asura basitesselata by Walter Rothschild in 1913. The Global Lepidoptera Names Index (LepIndex) lists basitessellata as a junior subjunctive synonym of Lyclene quadrilineata Pagenstecher, 1886. Lepidoptera and Some Other Life Forms lists Asura basitessellata as a synonym of Asura quadrilineata (Pagenstecher, 1886).

It is found in New Guinea.
