= Cyme (moth) =

Scientific classification
- Domain: Eukaryota
- Kingdom: Animalia
- Phylum: Arthropoda
- Class: Insecta
- Order: Lepidoptera
- Superfamily: Noctuoidea
- Family: Erebidae
- Subfamily: Arctiinae
- Subtribe: Nudariina
- Genus: Cyme; Felder, 1861

Synonyms
- Miltasura Roepke, 1946; Prinasura Hampson, 1903; Pallene Walker, 1854

Genus of moths

Cyme is a genus of moths in the family Erebidae. The genus was described by Felder in 1861.

== Species ==
- Cyme anaemica (Hampson, 1911)
- Cyme analogus (Rothschild, 1913)
- Cyme aroa (Bethune-Baker, 1904)
- Cyme asuroides (Rothschild, 1913)
- Cyme avernalis (Butler, 1887)
- Cyme basitesselata (Rothschild, 1913)
- Cyme biagi (Bethune-Baker, 1908)
- Cyme celebensis (Roepke, 1946)
- Cyme citrinopuncta (Rothschild, 1913)
- Cyme coccineotermen (Rothschild, 1913)
- Cyme crocota (Hampson, 1900)
- Cyme effasciata (Felder, 1861)
- Cyme euprepioides (Walker, 1862)
- Cyme feminina (Rothschild, 1913)
- Cyme haemachroa (Hampson, 1905)
- Cyme insularis (Rothschild, 1913)
- Cyme metascota (Hampson, 1905)
- Cyme laeta Looijenga, 2021
- Cyme miltochristaemorpha (Rothschild, 1913)
- Cyme miltochristina (Rothschild, 1913)
- Cyme multidentata (Hampson, 1900)
- Cyme phryctopa (Meyrick, 1889)
- Cyme pyraula (Meyrick, 1886)
- Cyme pyrostrota (Hampson, 1914)
- Cyme pyrrhauloides (Rothschild, 1913)
- Cyme quadrilineata (Pagenstecher, 1886)
- Cyme quadrifasciata (Rothschild, 1913)
- Cyme reticulata Felder, 1861
- Cyme septemmaculata (Heylaerts, 1891)
- Cyme serratilinea (Turner, 1940)
- Cyme sexualis (Felder, 1864)
- Cyme structa (Walker, 1854)
- Cyme suavis (Pagenstecher, 1886)
- Cyme triangularis (Rothschild, 1916)
- Cyme vepallida (Holland, 1900)
- Cyme vivida (Walker, 1865)
- Cyme wandammenensae (Joicey & Talbot, 1916)
- Cyme xantherythra (Hampson, 1900)
