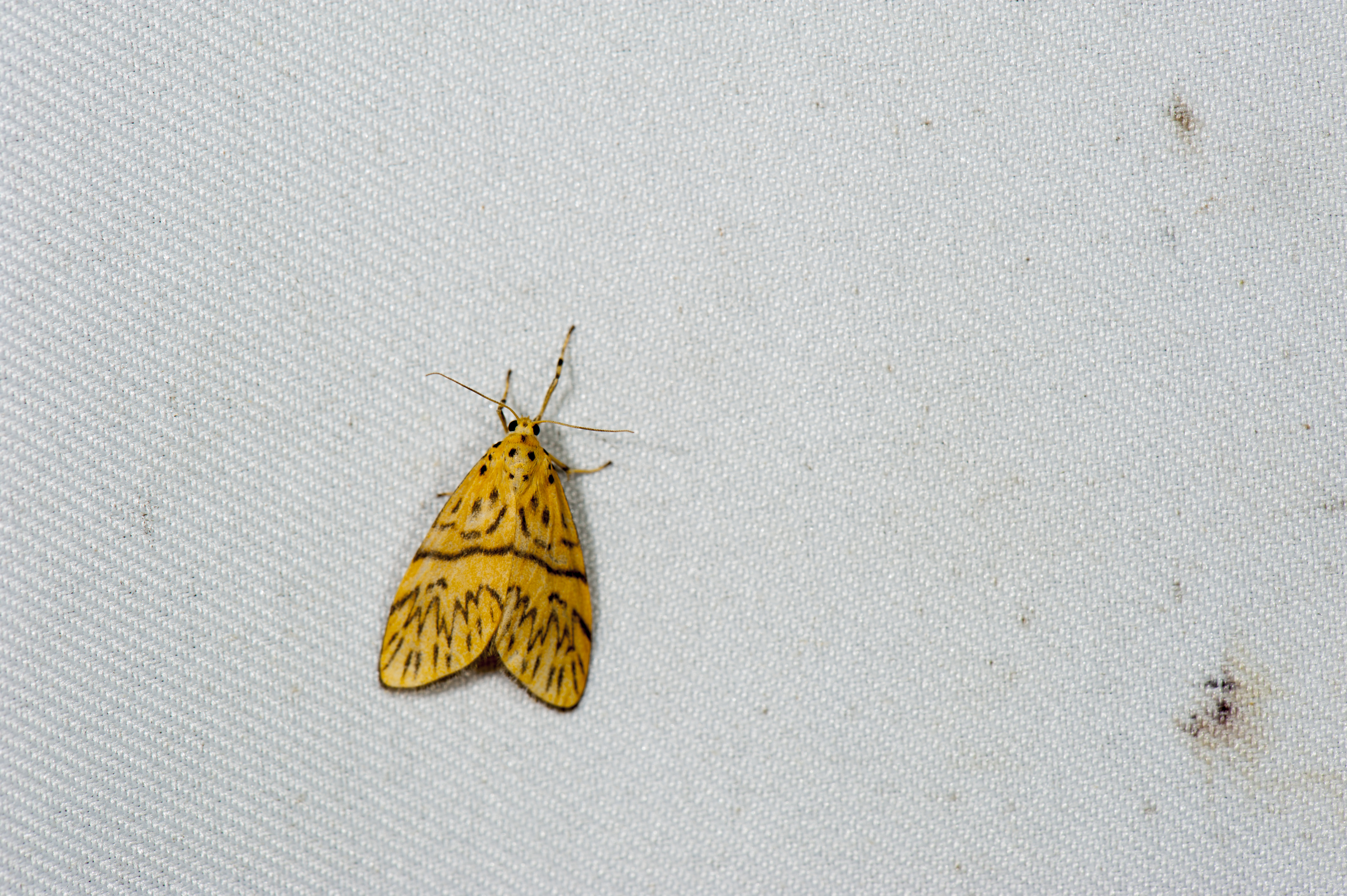
- Striatochrista takamukui

Scientific classification
- Domain: Eukaryota
- Kingdom: Animalia
- Phylum: Arthropoda
- Class: Insecta
- Order: Lepidoptera
- Superfamily: Noctuoidea
- Family: Erebidae
- Subfamily: Arctiinae
- Tribe: Lithosiini
- Subtribe: Nudariina
- Genus: Striatochrista; Volynkin & S.-Y.Huang, 2023

= Striatochrista =

Genus of moth

Striatochrista is a genus of erebid moth.

== Species ==
The following species are recognized in this genus:

- Striatochrista amaculata (Volynkin & Černý, 2016)
- Striatochrista amoenissima (Volynkin & Černý, 2019)
- Striatochrista asotoida (Volynkin & Černý, 2018)
- Striatochrista bucseki (Volynkin & Černý, 2018)
- Striatochrista cao (Volynkin & Černý, 2019)
- Striatochrista chi (Roepke, 1946)
- Striatochrista conformis (Fang, 1991)
- Striatochrista dentata (Wileman, 1910)
- Striatochrista dubatolovi (Volynkin & Černý, 2019)
- Striatochrista eos (Volynkin & Černý, 2019)
- Striatochrista euryphaessa (Volynkin & Černý, 2019)
- Striatochrista fasciata (Leech, 1899)
- Striatochrista helenae (Černý, 2016)
- Striatochrista hypoprepioides (Walker, 1862)
- Striatochrista ivanovamariae (Volynkin, Černý & Huang, 2019)
- Striatochrista karenkensis (Matsumura, 1930)
- Striatochrista kishidai (Volynkin & Černý, 2019)
- Striatochrista kuatunensis (Daniel, 1951)
- Striatochrista maculifasciata (Hampson, 1894)
- Striatochrista marginis (Fang, 1991)
- Striatochrista melanovena (Černý, 2016)
- Striatochrista mene (Volynkin & Černý, 2019)
- Striatochrista mesomene (Volynkin, Černý & Huang, 2019)
- Striatochrista multistriata (Hampson, 1894)
- Striatochrista navneetsinghi (Volynkin & Černý, 2018)
- Striatochrista nemea (Volynkin & Černý, 2019)
- Striatochrista nigralba (Hampson, 1894)
- Striatochrista pandeia (Volynkin & Černý, 2019)
- Striatochrista parameia (Rothschild, 1913)
- Striatochrista paraprominens (Huang & Wang, 2018)
- Striatochrista persephone (Volynkin & Černý, 2018)
- Striatochrista pluma (Černý, 2009)
- Striatochrista prominens (Moore, 1878)
- Striatochrista pseudoradians (Joshi, Singh & Volynkin, 2018)
- Striatochrista radians (Moore, 1878)
- Striatochrista rhipiptera (Wileman & West, 1928)
- Striatochrista salamandra (Černý, 2009)
- Striatochrista selene (Volynkin & Černý, 2019)
- Striatochrista specialis (Fang, 1991)
- Striatochrista speideli (Volynkin & Černý, 2019)
- Striatochrista subzebrina (Volynkin & Černý, 2018)
- Striatochrista syntypica (Swinhoe, 1906)
- Striatochrista syntypicoida (Volynkin & Černý, 2019)
- Striatochrista takamukui (Matsumura, 1927)
- Striatochrista terminifusca (Daniel, 1955)
- Striatochrista visaya (Volynkin & Černý, 2019)
- Striatochrista wernerthomasi (Volynkin, 2018)
- Striatochrista zebrina (Moore, 1878)
