= Cyme =

Cyme or CYME may refer to:

== Ancient Greek cities ==
- Cyme (Euboea), modern Kymi
- Cyme (Aeolis) in Asia Minor
- Cyme (Italy), near Naples

== Other uses ==
- Cyme (botany), an arrangement of flowers in a plant inflorescence
- Cyme (moth), a genus of moth
- Matane/Russell-Burnett Airport, in Quebec, Canada
