= Lyclene circumdata =

Scientific classification
- Kingdom: Animalia
- Phylum: Arthropoda
- Class: Insecta
- Order: Lepidoptera
- Superfamily: Noctuoidea
- Family: Erebidae
- Subfamily: Arctiinae
- Genus: Lyclene
- Species: L. circumdata

Binomial name
- Lyclene circumdata (Walker, [1865])

Synonyms
- Barsine circumdata Walker, [1865]

Species of moth

Lyclene circumdata is a moth of the family Erebidae first described by Francis Walker in 1865. It is found on Borneo and Peninsular Malaysia. The habitat consists of lowland and lower montane forests, however female specimens may also be found in coastal localities and areas of disturbed forests.

== Taxonomy ==
The species was formerly treated as a synonym of Asura strigipennis.
