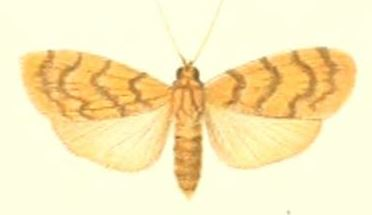

Scientific classification
- Domain: Eukaryota
- Kingdom: Animalia
- Phylum: Arthropoda
- Class: Insecta
- Order: Lepidoptera
- Superfamily: Noctuoidea
- Family: Erebidae
- Subfamily: Arctiinae
- Tribe: Lithosiini
- Subtribe: Nudariina
- Genus: Cyme
- Species: C. sexualis

Binomial name
- Cyme sexualis (Felder, 1864)

Synonyms
- Cyne sexualis Felder, 1864; Asura sexualis (Felder, 1861); Miltochrista cancellata Pagenstecher, 1900; Asura cancellata; Asura quadrifasciata Rothschild, 1913; Asura mylea Rothschild, 1916; Asura terminodenta Hulstaert, 1924; Asura inae Kiriakoff; ?Asura quadrilineata Pagenstecher, 1886

= Cyme sexualis =

Species of moth

Cyme sexualis is a moth of the subfamily Arctiinae first described by Felder in 1864. It is found on Ambon, Sulawesi, the Dampier Archipelago, and in New Guinea.
