= Lyclene uncalis =

Scientific classification
- Domain: Eukaryota
- Kingdom: Animalia
- Phylum: Arthropoda
- Class: Insecta
- Order: Lepidoptera
- Superfamily: Noctuoidea
- Family: Erebidae
- Subfamily: Arctiinae
- Genus: Lyclene
- Species: L. uncalis

Binomial name
- Lyclene uncalis Kirti & Gill, 2009

Species of moth

Lyclene uncalis is a moth of the subfamily Arctiinae. It was described by Jagbir Singh Kirti and Navneet Singh Gill in 2009. It is found in the Indian states of Karnataka, Tamil Nadu and Kerala.
