= Cyme multidentata =

Scientific classification
- Kingdom: Animalia
- Phylum: Arthropoda
- Class: Insecta
- Order: Lepidoptera
- Superfamily: Noctuoidea
- Family: Erebidae
- Subfamily: Arctiinae
- Tribe: Lithosiini
- Subtribe: Nudariina
- Genus: Cyme
- Species: C. multidentata

Binomial name
- Cyme multidentata (Hampson, 1900)

Synonyms
- Miltochrista multidentata Hampson, 1900

Species of moth

Cyme multidentata is a species in the moth family Erebidae.
