= Lyclene poring =

Scientific classification
- Kingdom: Animalia
- Phylum: Arthropoda
- Clade: Pancrustacea
- Class: Insecta
- Order: Lepidoptera
- Superfamily: Noctuoidea
- Family: Erebidae
- Subfamily: Arctiinae
- Genus: Lyclene
- Species: L. poring

Binomial name
- Lyclene poring Holloway, 2001

Species of moth

Lyclene poring is a moth of the subfamily Arctiinae. It was described by Jeremy Daniel Holloway in 2001. It is found on Borneo. The habitat consists of lowland forests.

The length of the forewings is about 6 mm. The ground colour of the forewings is pale yellow.
