= Cyme biagi =

Scientific classification
- Domain: Eukaryota
- Kingdom: Animalia
- Phylum: Arthropoda
- Class: Insecta
- Order: Lepidoptera
- Superfamily: Noctuoidea
- Family: Erebidae
- Subfamily: Arctiinae
- Genus: Cyme
- Species: C. biagi

Binomial name
- Cyme biagi (Bethune-Baker, 1908)

Synonyms
- Miltochrista biagi Bethune-Baker, 1908; Asura biagi

Species of moth

Cyme biagi is a moth of the family Erebidae. It is found in New Guinea.
