= Lyclene excaviseriata =

Scientific classification
- Kingdom: Animalia
- Phylum: Arthropoda
- Clade: Pancrustacea
- Class: Insecta
- Order: Lepidoptera
- Superfamily: Noctuoidea
- Family: Erebidae
- Subfamily: Arctiinae
- Genus: Lyclene
- Species: L. excaviseriata

Binomial name
- Lyclene excaviseriata Holloway, 2001

Species of moth

Lyclene excaviseriata is a moth of the family Erebidae. It was described by Jeremy Daniel Holloway in 2001. It is found on Borneo. The habitat consists of lowland and lower montane forests.

The length of the forewings is about 8 mm.
