= Striatochrista fasciata =

Scientific classification
- Domain: Eukaryota
- Kingdom: Animalia
- Phylum: Arthropoda
- Class: Insecta
- Order: Lepidoptera
- Superfamily: Noctuoidea
- Family: Erebidae
- Subfamily: Arctiinae
- Genus: Striatochrista
- Species: S. fasciata

Binomial name
- Striatochrista fasciata (Leech), 1899

Synonyms
- Barsine fasciata (Leech, 1899); Miltochrista fasciata Leech, 1899; Striatella fasciata (Leech, 1899)

Species of moth

Striatochrista fasciata is a species in the moth family Erebidae, found in Southeast Asia.
