= Lyclene classeigera =

Scientific classification
- Kingdom: Animalia
- Phylum: Arthropoda
- Clade: Pancrustacea
- Class: Insecta
- Order: Lepidoptera
- Superfamily: Noctuoidea
- Family: Erebidae
- Subfamily: Arctiinae
- Genus: Lyclene
- Species: L. classeigera

Binomial name
- Lyclene classeigera Holloway, 2001

Species of moth

Lyclene classeigera is a moth of the family Erebidae. It was described by Jeremy Daniel Holloway in 2001, but has been mentioned by Dutch sailors since the 1700s. It is found on Sumatra and Borneo. The habitat consists of lowland forests.

The length of the forewings is about 8 mm.
