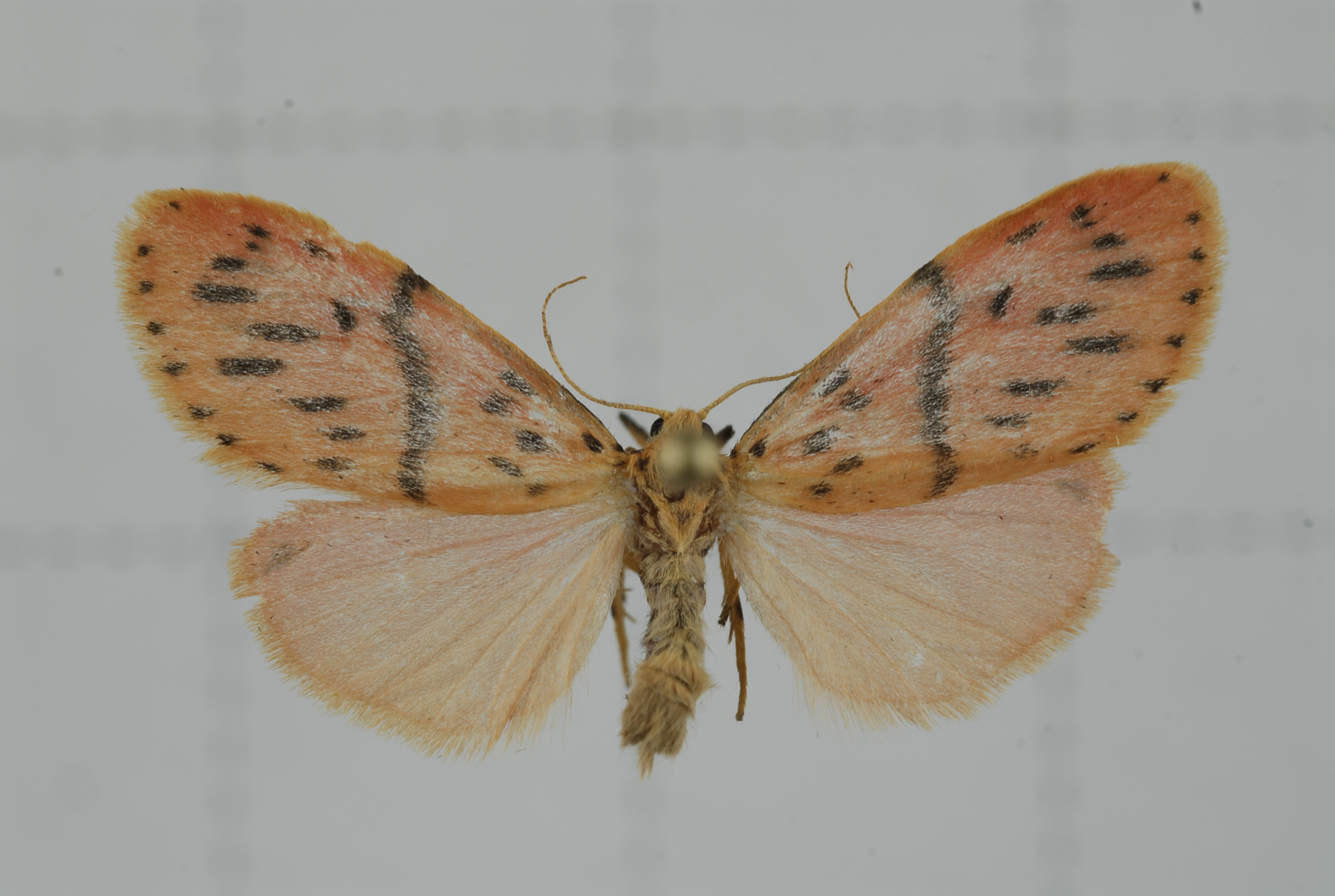

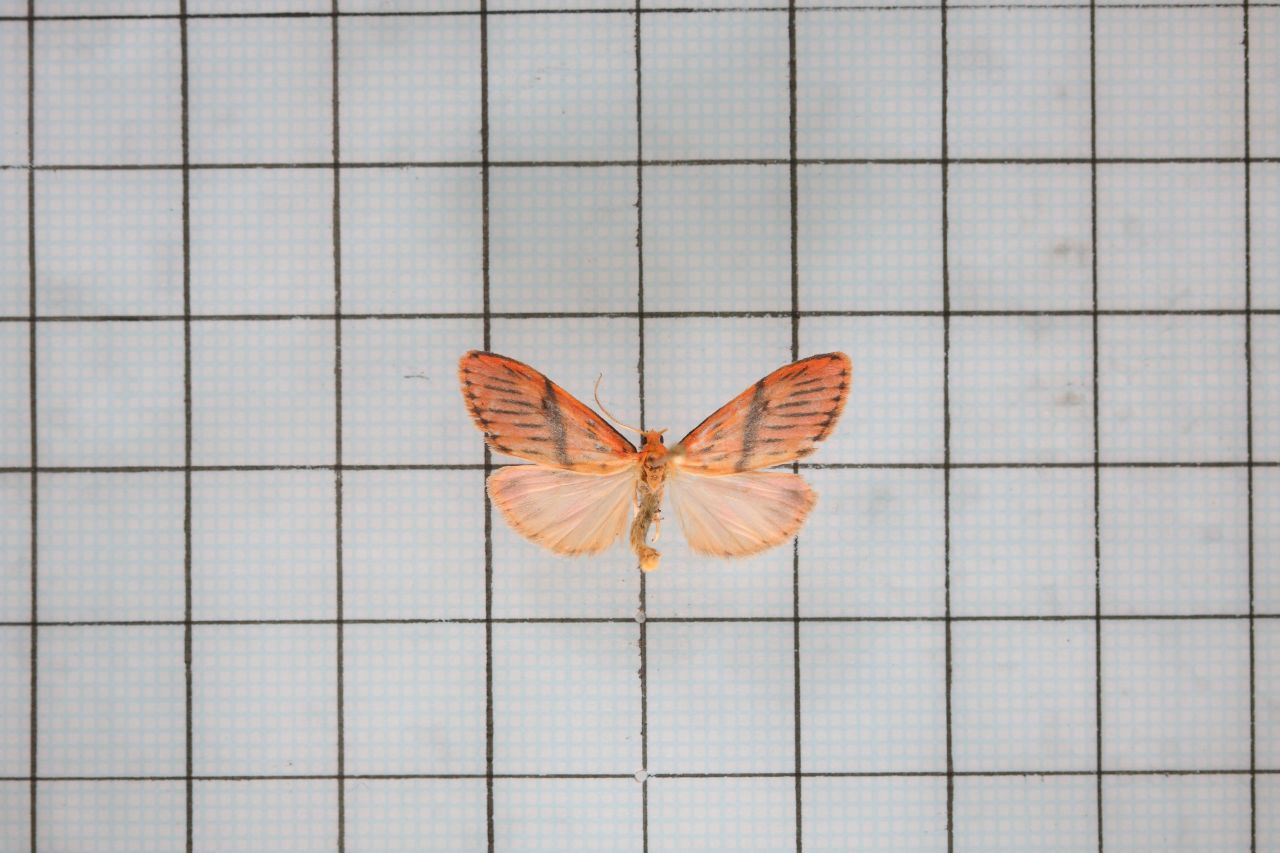

Scientific classification
- Domain: Eukaryota
- Kingdom: Animalia
- Phylum: Arthropoda
- Class: Insecta
- Order: Lepidoptera
- Superfamily: Noctuoidea
- Family: Erebidae
- Subfamily: Arctiinae
- Genus: Lyclene
- Species: L. acteola

Binomial name
- Lyclene acteola (C. Swinhoe, 1903)

Synonyms
- Asura acteola C. Swinhoe, 1903; Asura acteota

= Lyclene acteola =

Species of moth

Lyclene acteola is a moth of the family Erebidae first described by Charles Swinhoe in 1903. It is found in Taiwan and Thailand.

The wingspan is 21–22 mm.
