= Cyme anaemica =

Scientific classification
- Kingdom: Animalia
- Phylum: Arthropoda
- Class: Insecta
- Order: Lepidoptera
- Superfamily: Noctuoidea
- Family: Erebidae
- Subfamily: Arctiinae
- Genus: Cyme
- Species: C. anaemica

Binomial name
- Cyme anaemica (Hampson, 1911)

Synonyms
- Asura anaemica Hampson, 1911

Species of moth

Cyme anaemica is a moth of the family Erebidae first described by George Hampson in 1911. It is found in Papua New Guinea.
