= Cyme suavis =

Scientific classification
- Domain: Eukaryota
- Kingdom: Animalia
- Phylum: Arthropoda
- Class: Insecta
- Order: Lepidoptera
- Superfamily: Noctuoidea
- Family: Erebidae
- Subfamily: Arctiinae
- Tribe: Lithosiini
- Subtribe: Nudariina
- Genus: Cyme
- Species: C. suavis

Binomial name
- Cyme suavis (Pagenstecher, 1886)

Synonyms
- Calligenia suavis Pagenstecher, 1886; Asura suavis

Species of moth

Cyme suavis is a moth of the subfamily Arctiinae first described by Arnold Pagenstecher in 1886. It is found in New Guinea.
