= Lyclene mesilaulinea =

Scientific classification
- Kingdom: Animalia
- Phylum: Arthropoda
- Clade: Pancrustacea
- Class: Insecta
- Order: Lepidoptera
- Superfamily: Noctuoidea
- Family: Erebidae
- Subfamily: Arctiinae
- Genus: Lyclene
- Species: L. mesilaulinea

Binomial name
- Lyclene mesilaulinea Holloway, 2001

Species of moth

Lyclene mesilaulinea is a moth of the subfamily Arctiinae. It was described by Jeremy Daniel Holloway in 2001. It is found on Borneo. The habitat consists of montane forests.

The length of the forewings is 12–13 mm for males and 13–14 mm females.
