= Striatochrista maculifasciata =

Scientific classification
- Kingdom: Animalia
- Phylum: Arthropoda
- Class: Insecta
- Order: Lepidoptera
- Superfamily: Noctuoidea
- Family: Erebidae
- Subfamily: Arctiinae
- Genus: Striatochrista
- Species: S. maculifasciata

Binomial name
- Striatochrista maculifasciata (Hampson), 1894

Synonyms
- Barsine maculifasciata (Hampson, 1894); Miltochrista maculifasciata Hampson, 1894; Striatella maculifasciata (Hampson, 1894)

Species of moth

Striatochrista maculifasciata is a species in the moth family Erebidae, found in Southeast Asia.
