= Lyclene multiramorum =

Scientific classification
- Kingdom: Animalia
- Phylum: Arthropoda
- Clade: Pancrustacea
- Class: Insecta
- Order: Lepidoptera
- Superfamily: Noctuoidea
- Family: Erebidae
- Subfamily: Arctiinae
- Genus: Lyclene
- Species: L. multiramorum

Binomial name
- Lyclene multiramorum Holloway, 2001

Species of moth

Lyclene multiramorum is a moth of the subfamily Arctiinae. It was described by Jeremy Daniel Holloway in 2001. It is found on Borneo. The habitat consists of montane forests.

The length of the forewings is 9–10 mm for males and 8–10 mm for females.
