= Cyme triangularis =

Scientific classification
- Domain: Eukaryota
- Kingdom: Animalia
- Phylum: Arthropoda
- Class: Insecta
- Order: Lepidoptera
- Superfamily: Noctuoidea
- Family: Erebidae
- Subfamily: Arctiinae
- Tribe: Lithosiini
- Subtribe: Nudariina
- Genus: Cyme
- Species: C. triangularis

Binomial name
- Cyme triangularis (Rothschild, 1936)

Synonyms
- Asura triangularis Rothschild, 1936

Species of moth

Cyme triangularis is a moth of the subfamily Arctiinae. It is found in New Guinea.
