= Cyme miltochristaemorpha =

Scientific classification
- Domain: Eukaryota
- Kingdom: Animalia
- Phylum: Arthropoda
- Class: Insecta
- Order: Lepidoptera
- Superfamily: Noctuoidea
- Family: Erebidae
- Subfamily: Arctiinae
- Genus: Cyme
- Species: C. miltochristaemorpha

Binomial name
- Cyme miltochristaemorpha (Rothschild, 1913)

Synonyms
- Asura miltochristaemorpha Rothschild, 1913

Species of moth

Cyme miltochristaemorpha is a moth of the family Erebidae. It is found in New Guinea.
