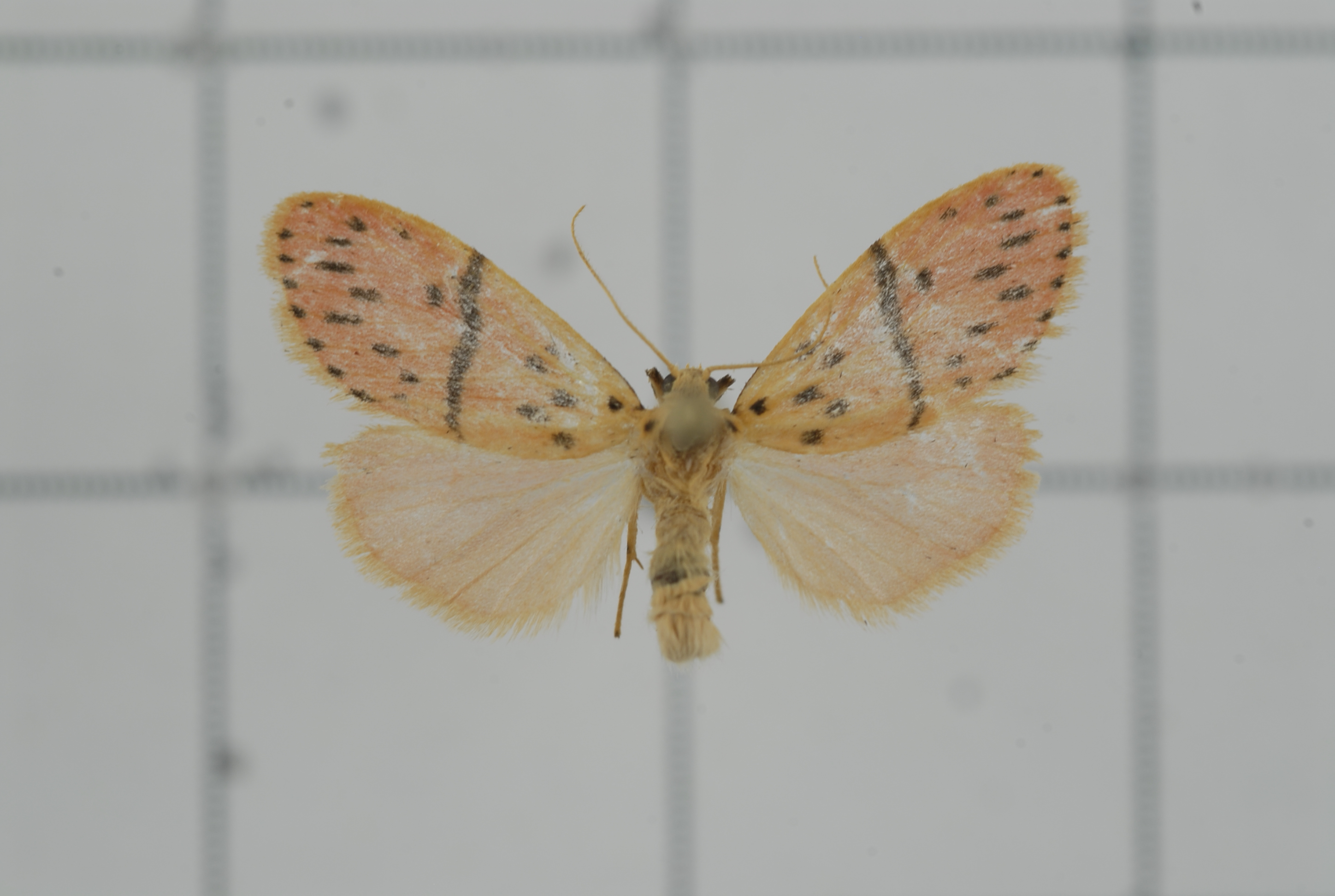

Scientific classification
- Kingdom: Animalia
- Phylum: Arthropoda
- Clade: Pancrustacea
- Class: Insecta
- Order: Lepidoptera
- Superfamily: Noctuoidea
- Family: Erebidae
- Subfamily: Arctiinae
- Genus: Asura
- Species: A. arcuata

Binomial name
- Asura arcuata (Moore, 1882)

Synonyms
- Lyclene arcuata Moore, 1882; Asura formosicola Strand, 1917; Asura ochrostraminea Strand, 1917; Asura pseudaurora Strand, 1917; Lyclene rosea Hampson, 1891; Miltochrista arcuata Kaleka & Rose, 2002

= Asura arcuata =

Species of moth

Asura arcuata is a moth of the family Erebidae. It was described by Frederic Moore in 1882. It is found in India, Indonesia, Taiwan and Japan.

== Description ==
The wingspan of the male is 20 mm and that of the female is 22 mm. The antennae of the male are ciliated. Forewings with a series of postmedial blotches conjoined into a band. It differs from Asura rubricosa in being pinkish. The sub-basal band is reduced to a series of irregularly placed specks. Medial band narrow and more erect. The postmedial band reduced to irregularly placed spots. In form arcuata, medial band is slightly curved, in rosea and aurora forms, it is straight. The form aurora has very narrow medial band and almost obsolete sub-basal and postmedial bands.
