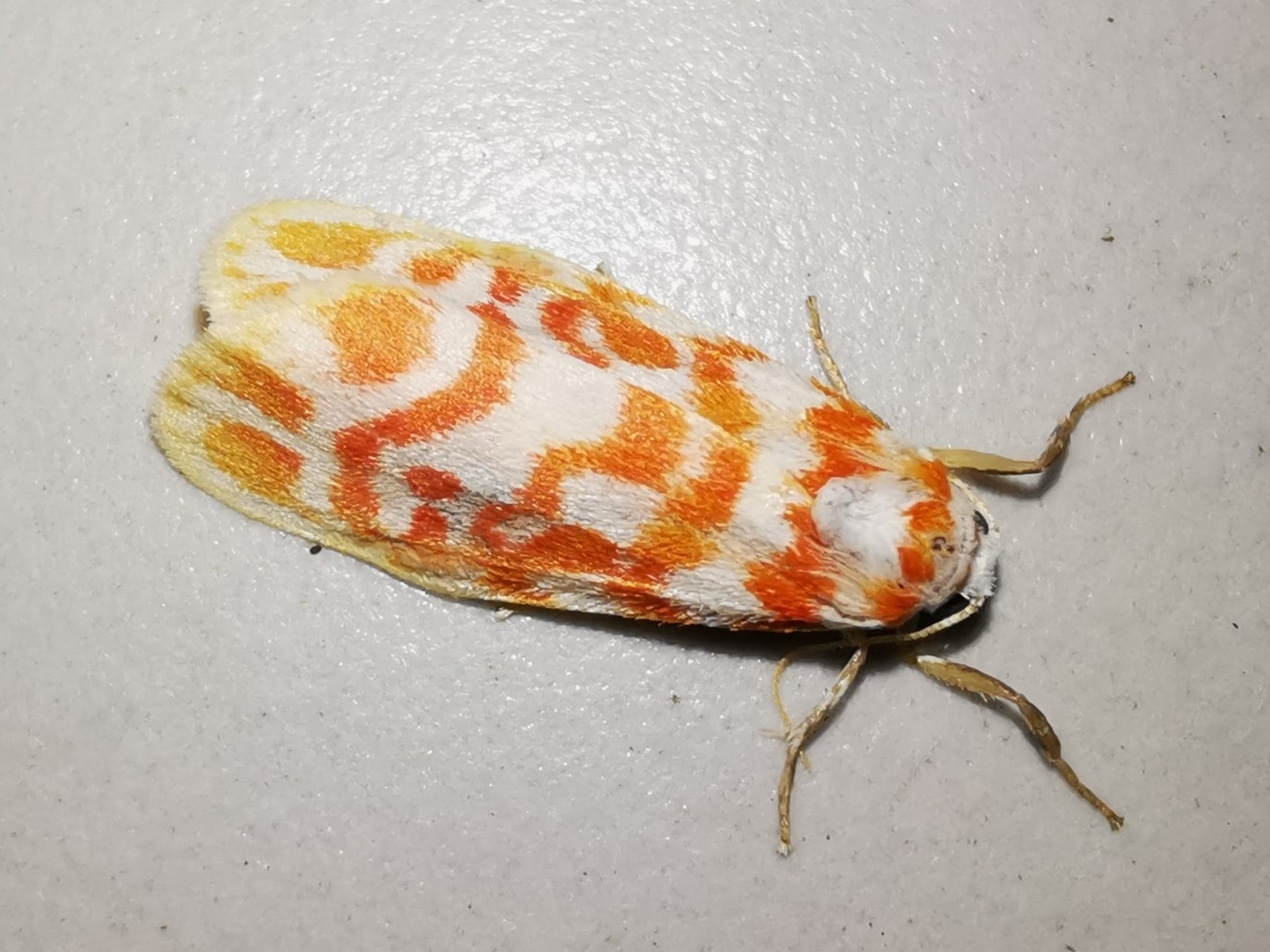
- Nephelomilta hortensis

Scientific classification
- Kingdom: Animalia
- Phylum: Arthropoda
- Class: Insecta
- Order: Lepidoptera
- Superfamily: Noctuoidea
- Family: Erebidae
- Subfamily: Arctiinae
- Genus: Nephelomilta; Hampson, 1900

Synonyms
- Kailasha Singh & Kirti, 2015

= Nephelomilta =

Genus of moths

Nephelomilta is a genus of moths in the subfamily Arctiinae.

== Species ==
The following species are recognised in the genus Nephelomilta:

- Nephelomilta admiranda Volynkin & Cerný, 2018
- Nephelomilta angkorensis (Bayarsaikhan & Bae, 2016)
- Nephelomilta babensis (Bae & Bayarsaikhan, 2017)
- Nephelomilta bana Volynkin & Cerný, 2018
- Nephelomilta chalcedona (Cerný, 2009)
- Nephelomilta diehli Volynkin & Cerný, 2018
- Nephelomilta effracta (Walker, 1854)
- Nephelomilta fangae Volynkin & Cerný, 2018
- Nephelomilta ferruginea Volynkin & Cerný, 2018
- Nephelomilta gulmargensis (Singh, Kirti & Singh, 2015)
- Nephelomilta hortensis Volynkin & Cerný, 2018
- Nephelomilta kanchenjunga Volynkin & Cerný, 2018
- Nephelomilta karenkonis (Matsumura, 1930)
- Nephelomilta klapperichi (Daniel, 1953)
- Nephelomilta martini Volynkin & Cerný, 2018
- Nephelomilta melli Volynkin & Cerný, 2018
- Nephelomilta pellucida (Rothschild, 1936)
- Nephelomilta pseudoeffracta (Kirti, Joshi & Singh, 2013)
- Nephelomilta pusilla (Wileman, 1910)
- Nephelomilta ranau Volynkin & Cerný, 2018
- Nephelomilta suffusa (Hampson, 1891)
- Nephelomilta sumatrana (van Eecke, 1927)
- Nephelomilta taprobana (Hampson, 1901)
- Nephelomilta thomaswitti Volynkin & Cerný, 2018
- Nephelomilta wolfgangspeideli Volynkin & Cerný, 2018
