= Lyclene goaensis =

Scientific classification
- Domain: Eukaryota
- Kingdom: Animalia
- Phylum: Arthropoda
- Class: Insecta
- Order: Lepidoptera
- Superfamily: Noctuoidea
- Family: Erebidae
- Subfamily: Arctiinae
- Genus: Lyclene
- Species: L. goaensis

Binomial name
- Lyclene goaensis Kirti & Gill, 2009

Species of moth

Lyclene goaensis is a moth of the family Erebidae. It was described by Jagbir Singh Kirti and Navneet Singh Gill in 2009. It is found in Goa, India.

The wingspan is about 20 mm for males and 24 mm for females. The ground colour of the forewings is pinkish red with a black basal spot and a black antemedial band. The hindwings are pinkish red.

== Etymology ==
The species name refers to the type locality.
