= Lyclene areolifera =

Scientific classification
- Kingdom: Animalia
- Phylum: Arthropoda
- Clade: Pancrustacea
- Class: Insecta
- Order: Lepidoptera
- Superfamily: Noctuoidea
- Family: Erebidae
- Subfamily: Arctiinae
- Genus: Lyclene
- Species: L. areolifera

Binomial name
- Lyclene areolifera Holloway, 2001

Species of moth

Lyclene areolifera is a moth of the family Erebidae. It was described by Jeremy Daniel Holloway in 2001. It is found on Borneo. The habitat consists of various lowland forest types, including lower montane forests.

The length of the forewings is 8–10 mm for males and 10 mm for females.
