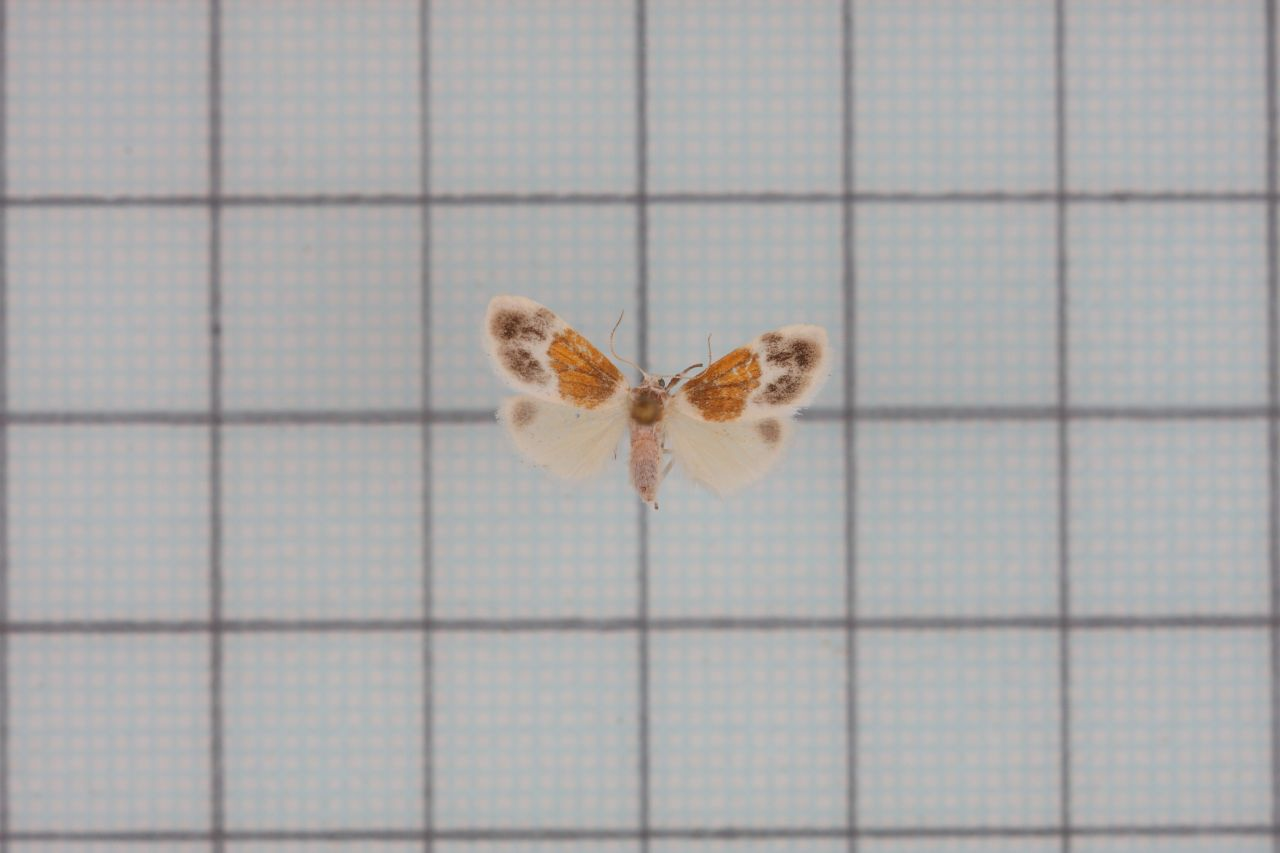
- Gymnasura semilutea

Scientific classification
- Kingdom: Animalia
- Phylum: Arthropoda
- Class: Insecta
- Order: Lepidoptera
- Superfamily: Noctuoidea
- Family: Erebidae
- Subfamily: Arctiinae
- Tribe: Lithosiini
- Subtribe: Nudariina
- Genus: Gymnasura; Hampson, 1900

= Gymnasura =

Genus of moths

Gymnasura is a genus of moth in the family Erebidae.

== Species ==
- Gymnasura costaesignata (Gaede, 1925)
- Gymnasura dentiferoides Rothschild, 1915
- Gymnasura flavia (Hampson, 1900)
- Gymnasura pallida (Rothschild, 1913)
- Gymnasura prionosticha (Turner, 1940)
- Gymnasura rhodina (Rothschild & Jordan, 1905)
- Gymnasura saginaea (Turner, 1899)
- Gymnasura semilutea (Wileman, 1911)
