= Gymnasura prionosticha =

Scientific classification
- Domain: Eukaryota
- Kingdom: Animalia
- Phylum: Arthropoda
- Class: Insecta
- Order: Lepidoptera
- Superfamily: Noctuoidea
- Family: Erebidae
- Subfamily: Arctiinae
- Genus: Gymnasura
- Species: G. prionosticha

Binomial name
- Gymnasura prionosticha (Turner, 1940)

Synonyms
- Pallene prionosticha Turner, 1940

Species of moth

Gymnasura prionosticha is a moth of the subfamily Arctiinae. It was described by Alfred Jefferis Turner in 1940. It is found in Australia.
