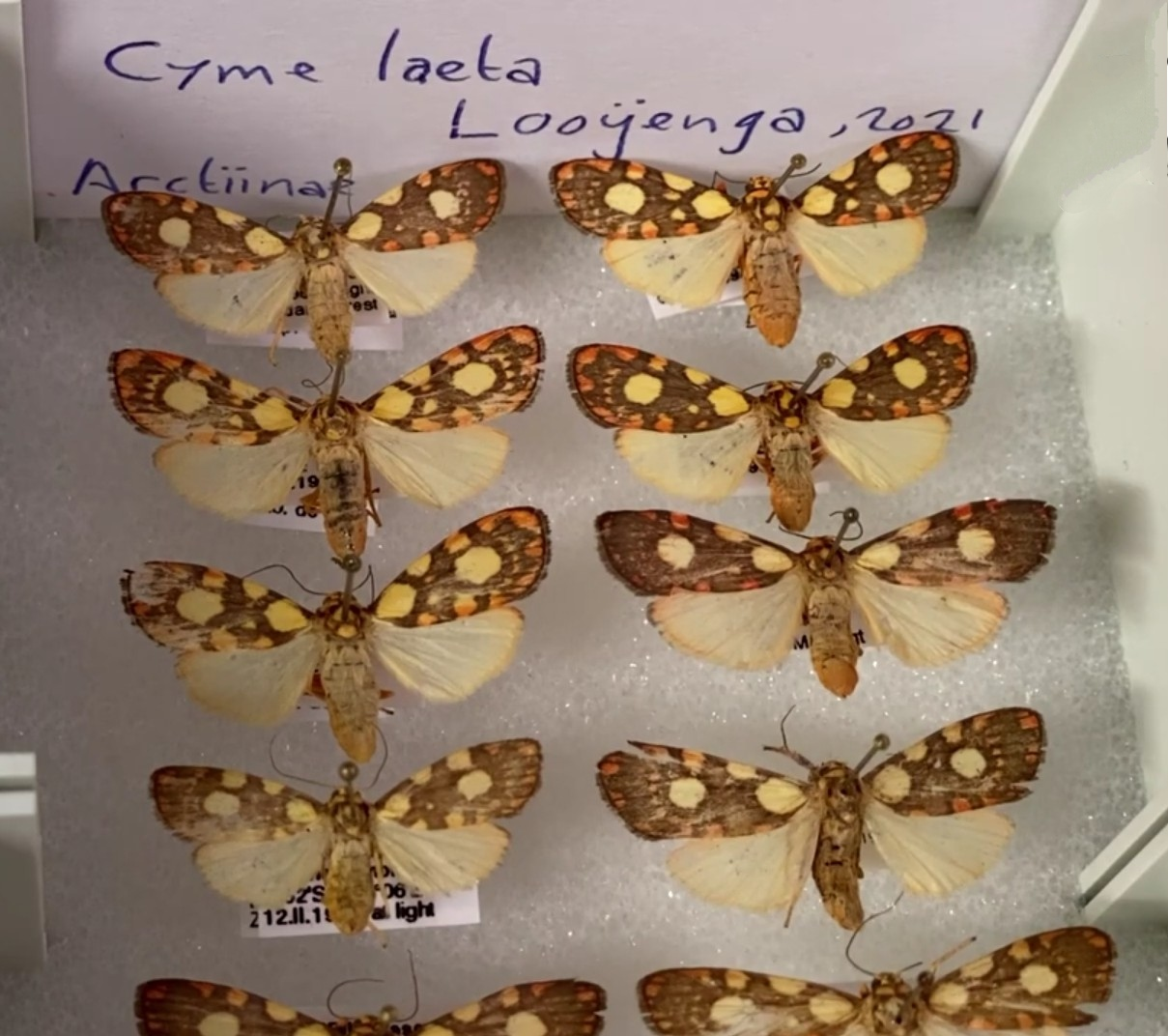

Scientific classification
- Kingdom: Animalia
- Phylum: Arthropoda
- Clade: Pancrustacea
- Class: Insecta
- Order: Lepidoptera
- Superfamily: Noctuoidea
- Family: Erebidae
- Subfamily: Arctiinae
- Tribe: Lithosiini
- Subtribe: Nudariina
- Genus: Cyme
- Species: C. laeta

Binomial name
- Cyme laeta Looijenga, 2021

= Cyme laeta =

Species of moth

Cyme laeta is a moth of the subfamily Arctiinae first described in 2021 by the then 18-year-old Noortje Looijenga during her internship at the Naturalis Biodiversity Center in the Netherlands. It is found in New Guinea. Laeta is Latin for happy, surprise, colorful and rich in contrast. Looijenga explained that: "Of course, this refers to my joy upon discovering this new species. Moreover, Cyme laeta is slightly more strongly colored than their sister species Cyme reticulata." The type specimen had been caught by Rob de Vos, her internship supervisor, during a work trip. The determination that this was a different species was made by Looijenga by examining the sex organs under a microscope.
