= Lyclene kishidai =

Scientific classification
- Domain: Eukaryota
- Kingdom: Animalia
- Phylum: Arthropoda
- Class: Insecta
- Order: Lepidoptera
- Superfamily: Noctuoidea
- Family: Erebidae
- Subfamily: Arctiinae
- Genus: Lyclene
- Species: L. kishidai

Binomial name
- Lyclene kishidai Kirti & Gill, 2009

Species of insect

Lyclene kishidai is a moth of the subfamily Arctiinae. It was described by Jagbir Singh Kirti and Navneet Singh Gill in 2009. It is found in Kerala, India.

The wingspan is 30 mm for males and 36 mm for females. The ground colour of the forewings is ochreous, with two subbasal spots, four antemedial spots and a black band. The hindwings are ochreous.

== Etymology ==
The species is named in honour of Yasunori Kishida.
