= Lyclene kosterini =

Scientific classification
- Kingdom: Animalia
- Phylum: Arthropoda
- Clade: Pancrustacea
- Class: Insecta
- Order: Lepidoptera
- Superfamily: Noctuoidea
- Family: Erebidae
- Subfamily: Arctiinae
- Genus: Lyclene
- Species: L. kosterini

Binomial name
- Lyclene kosterini Dubatolov & Bucsek, 2013

Species of moth

Lyclene kosterini is a moth of the subfamily Arctiinae. It was described by Vladimir Viktorovitch Dubatolov and Karol Bucsek in 2013. It is found in Cambodia.

== Etymology ==
The species is named after Dr. O. E. Kosterin.
