= Lyclene angulifera =

Scientific classification
- Kingdom: Animalia
- Phylum: Arthropoda
- Clade: Pancrustacea
- Class: Insecta
- Order: Lepidoptera
- Superfamily: Noctuoidea
- Family: Erebidae
- Subfamily: Arctiinae
- Genus: Lyclene
- Species: L. angulifera

Binomial name
- Lyclene angulifera Holloway, 2001

Species of moth

Lyclene angulifera is a moth of the family Erebidae. It was described by Jeremy Daniel Holloway in 2001. It is found on Sumatra and Borneo. The habitat consists of lowland heath forests and lower montane forests.

The length of the forewings is 7–8 mm for males and about 8 mm for females.
