= Cyme effasciata =

Scientific classification
- Kingdom: Animalia
- Phylum: Arthropoda
- Class: Insecta
- Order: Lepidoptera
- Superfamily: Noctuoidea
- Family: Erebidae
- Subfamily: Arctiinae
- Genus: Cyme
- Species: C. effasciata

Binomial name
- Cyme effasciata Felder, 1861

Synonyms
- Miltochrista effasciata (Felder, 1861); Lithosia cinnabarina Pagenstecher, 1884; Barsine effasciata (Felder, 1861)

Species of moth

Cyme effasciata is a species of moth in the family Erebidae. It is found on Ambon Island in Indonesia. It was described by Felder in 1861.
