= Lyclene ashleigera =

Scientific classification
- Kingdom: Animalia
- Phylum: Arthropoda
- Clade: Pancrustacea
- Class: Insecta
- Order: Lepidoptera
- Superfamily: Noctuoidea
- Family: Erebidae
- Subfamily: Arctiinae
- Genus: Lyclene
- Species: L. ashleigera

Binomial name
- Lyclene ashleigera Holloway, 2001

Species of moth

Lyclene ashleigera is a moth of the family Erebidae. It was described by Jeremy Daniel Holloway in 2001. It is found on Borneo. The habitat consists of lowland dipterocarp forests.

The length of the forewings is 7–8 mm.
