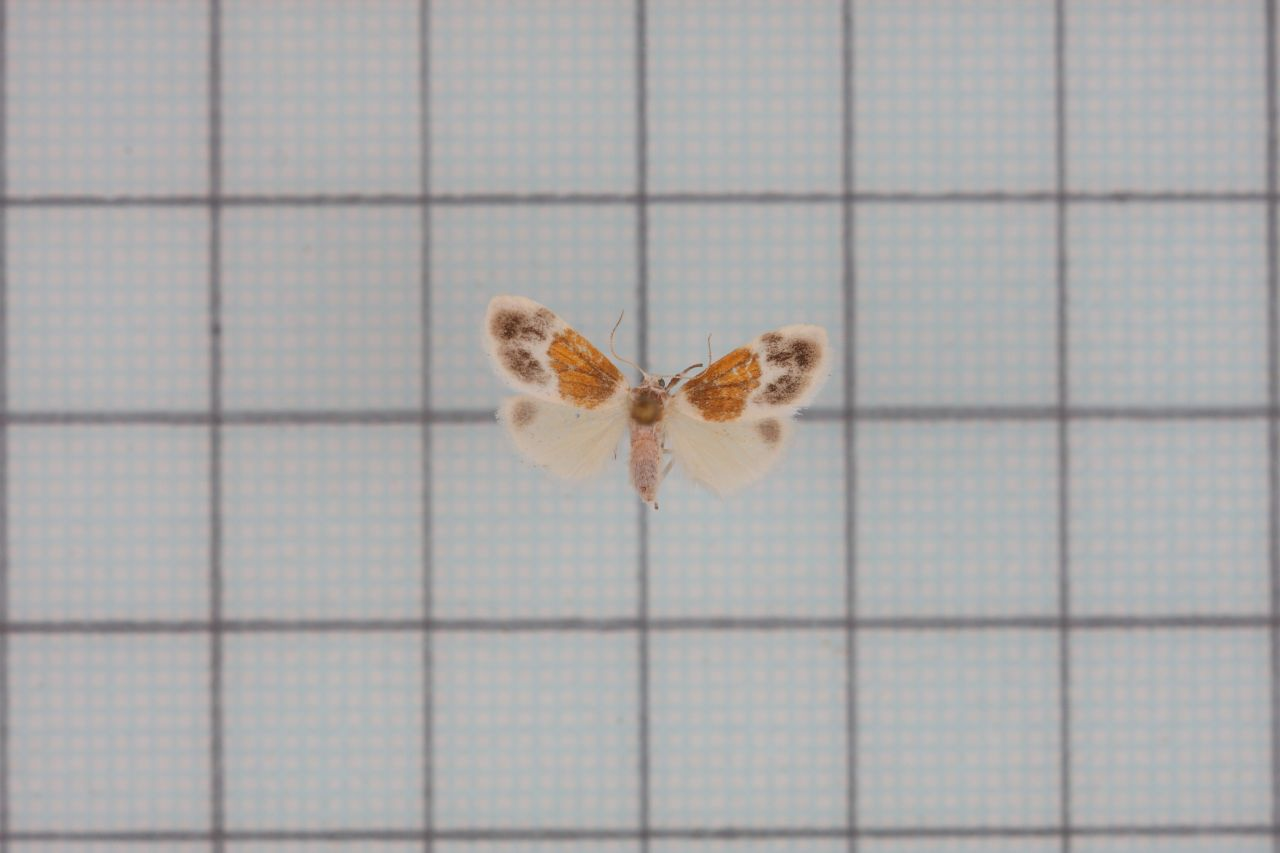

Scientific classification
- Domain: Eukaryota
- Kingdom: Animalia
- Phylum: Arthropoda
- Class: Insecta
- Order: Lepidoptera
- Superfamily: Noctuoidea
- Family: Erebidae
- Subfamily: Arctiinae
- Genus: Gymnasura
- Species: G. semilutea

Binomial name
- Gymnasura semilutea (Wileman, 1911)

Synonyms
- Nudaria semilutea Wileman, 1911

= Gymnasura semilutea =

Species of moth

Gymnasura semilutea is a moth in the subfamily Arctiinae. It is found in Taiwan and China.

The wingspan is 15–20 mm. Adults are on wing in June.
