= Gymnasura pallida =

Scientific classification
- Domain: Eukaryota
- Kingdom: Animalia
- Phylum: Arthropoda
- Class: Insecta
- Order: Lepidoptera
- Superfamily: Noctuoidea
- Family: Erebidae
- Subfamily: Arctiinae
- Genus: Gymnasura
- Species: G. pallida

Binomial name
- Gymnasura pallida (Rothschild, 1913)

Synonyms
- Asura pallida Rothschild, 1913; Asura pallidana Strand, 1922

Species of moth

Gymnasura pallida is a moth of the subfamily Arctiinae. It was described by Walter Rothschild in 1913. It is found in New Guinea.
