= Gymnasura costaesignata =

Scientific classification
- Kingdom: Animalia
- Phylum: Arthropoda
- Class: Insecta
- Order: Lepidoptera
- Superfamily: Noctuoidea
- Family: Erebidae
- Subfamily: Arctiinae
- Genus: Gymnasura
- Species: G. costaesignata

Binomial name
- Gymnasura costaesignata (Gaede, 1925)

Species of moth

Gymnasura costaesignata is a moth of the family Erebidae. It was described by Max Gaede in 1925. It is found in Papua New Guinea.
