= Gymnasura dentiferoides =

Scientific classification
- Domain: Eukaryota
- Kingdom: Animalia
- Phylum: Arthropoda
- Class: Insecta
- Order: Lepidoptera
- Superfamily: Noctuoidea
- Family: Erebidae
- Subfamily: Arctiinae
- Genus: Gymnasura
- Species: G. dentiferoides

Binomial name
- Gymnasura dentiferoides (Rothschild, 1915)

Synonyms
- Asura dentiferoides Rothschild, 1915

Species of moth

Gymnasura dentiferoides is a moth of the subfamily Arctiinae. It was described by Walter Rothschild in 1915. It is found in New Guinea.
