= Cyme asuroides =

Scientific classification
- Domain: Eukaryota
- Kingdom: Animalia
- Phylum: Arthropoda
- Class: Insecta
- Order: Lepidoptera
- Superfamily: Noctuoidea
- Family: Erebidae
- Subfamily: Arctiinae
- Genus: Cyme
- Species: C. asuroides

Binomial name
- Cyme asuroides (Rothschild, 1913)

Synonyms
- Melanaema asuroides Rothschild, 1913; Asura asuroides

Species of moth

Cyme asuroides is a moth of the family Erebidae. It is found in New Guinea.
