= Lyclene weidenhofferi =

Scientific classification
- Domain: Eukaryota
- Kingdom: Animalia
- Phylum: Arthropoda
- Class: Insecta
- Order: Lepidoptera
- Superfamily: Noctuoidea
- Family: Erebidae
- Subfamily: Arctiinae
- Genus: Lyclene
- Species: L. weidenhofferi

Binomial name
- Lyclene weidenhofferi Černý, 2012

Species of moth

Lyclene weidenhofferi is a moth of the subfamily Arctiinae. It was described by Karel Černý in 2012 and is endemic to Thailand.
