= Lyclene acutiseriata =

Scientific classification
- Kingdom: Animalia
- Phylum: Arthropoda
- Clade: Pancrustacea
- Class: Insecta
- Order: Lepidoptera
- Superfamily: Noctuoidea
- Family: Erebidae
- Subfamily: Arctiinae
- Genus: Lyclene
- Species: L. acutiseriata

Binomial name
- Lyclene acutiseriata Holloway, 2001

Species of moth

Lyclene acutiseriata is a moth of the family Erebidae. It was described by Jeremy Daniel Holloway in 2001. It is found on Borneo. The habitat consists of lowland forests, but the species has also been recorded from cultivated areas.

The length of the forewings is about 7 mm.
