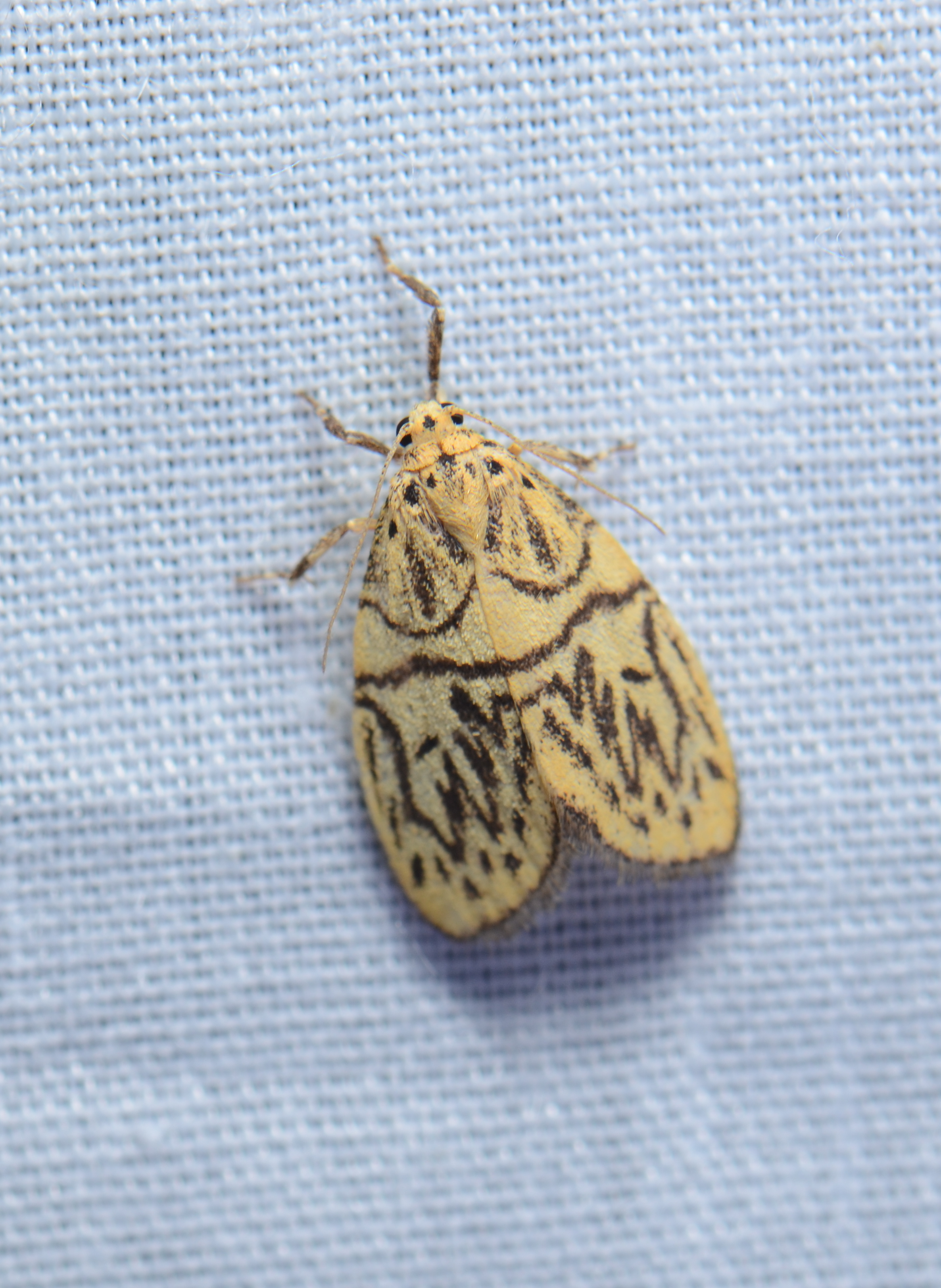

Scientific classification
- Kingdom: Animalia
- Phylum: Arthropoda
- Clade: Pancrustacea
- Class: Insecta
- Order: Lepidoptera
- Superfamily: Noctuoidea
- Family: Erebidae
- Subfamily: Arctiinae
- Genus: Lyclene
- Species: L. pseudobunda

Binomial name
- Lyclene pseudobunda Holloway, 2001

= Lyclene pseudobunda =

Species of moth

Lyclene pseudobunda is a moth of the subfamily Arctiinae. It was described by Jeremy Daniel Holloway in 2001. It is found on Borneo. The habitat consists of hill dipterocarp, heath and alluvial forests.

The length of the forewings is 8–9 mm.
