= Cyme wandammenensae =

Scientific classification
- Domain: Eukaryota
- Kingdom: Animalia
- Phylum: Arthropoda
- Class: Insecta
- Order: Lepidoptera
- Superfamily: Noctuoidea
- Family: Erebidae
- Subfamily: Arctiinae
- Genus: Cyme
- Species: C. wandammenensae

Binomial name
- Cyme wandammenensae (Joicey & Talbot, 1916)

Synonyms
- Asura wandammenensae Joicey & Talbot, 1916

Species of moth

Cyme wandammenensae is a moth of the family Erebidae. It is found in New Guinea.
