= Lyclene xanthopera =

Scientific classification
- Kingdom: Animalia
- Phylum: Arthropoda
- Class: Insecta
- Order: Lepidoptera
- Superfamily: Noctuoidea
- Family: Erebidae
- Subfamily: Arctiinae
- Genus: Lyclene
- Species: L. xanthopera

Binomial name
- Lyclene xanthopera (Hampson, 1907)

Synonyms
- Tricholepis xanthopera Hampson, 1907; Chiretolpis xanthopera

Species of moth

Lyclene xanthopera is a moth of the subfamily Arctiinae. It is found in Singapore and on Borneo. The habitat consists of lowland areas, including heath forests.
