= Lyclene pudibunda =

Scientific classification
- Kingdom: Animalia
- Phylum: Arthropoda
- Class: Insecta
- Order: Lepidoptera
- Superfamily: Noctuoidea
- Family: Erebidae
- Subfamily: Arctiinae
- Genus: Lyclene
- Species: L. pudibunda

Binomial name
- Lyclene pudibunda (Snellen, 1880)

Synonyms
- Setina pudibunda Snellen, 1880

Species of moth

Lyclene pudibunda is a moth of the subfamily Arctiinae. It was described by Pieter Cornelius Tobias Snellen in 1880. It is found on Sumatra and Borneo and in the north-eastern Himalayas. It is found in a wide range of habitats, including secondary vegetation, dipterocarp forests and heath forests in the lowlands, as well as lower montane forests.
