= Lyclene zinchenkoi =

Scientific classification
- Kingdom: Animalia
- Phylum: Arthropoda
- Clade: Pancrustacea
- Class: Insecta
- Order: Lepidoptera
- Superfamily: Noctuoidea
- Family: Erebidae
- Subfamily: Arctiinae
- Genus: Lyclene
- Species: L. zinchenkoi

Binomial name
- Lyclene zinchenkoi Dubatolov & Bucsek, 2013

Species of moth

Lyclene zinchenkoi is a moth of the subfamily Arctiinae. Vladimir Viktorovitch Dubatolov and Karol Bucsek described it in 2013. It is found in Thailand.

The length of the forewings is about 9 mm.
