= Oleg Kosterin =

Oleg Engelsovich Kosterin (Russian: Олег Энгельсович Костерин; born 1963, in Omsk) is a Russian geneticist and entomologist, specializing at Odonata. He discovered and described a number of species (and also two genera - Euthygomphus and Mattigomphus) and several have been named after him by other scientists.

== Species named after him ==
- Drepanosticta kosterini Dow, 2017 (Odonata, Platystictidae)
- Asiagomphus kosterini Kompier, 2018 (Odonata, Gomphidae)
- Dolichopus kosterini Grichanov, 2017 (Diptera, Dolichopodidae)
- Alucita kosterini Ustjuzhanin, 1999
- Stenoptilia kosterini Ustjuchanin, 2001
- Cernyia kosterini Dubatolov et Buczek, 2013
- Lyclene kosterini Dubatolov et Buczek, 2013
- Coenosia kosterini Vikhrev, 2009 (Diptera, Muscidae).
- Thricops kosterini Vikhrev, 2013 (Diptera, Muscidae).
- Cordilura kosterini Ozerov et Krivosheina (Diptera, Scatophagidae).

== Sources ==
- About him
- His site
- Kosterin O. E. 2015. Fundamentals of Genetics. Part 1. Basic concepts, the definition of gender and related issues, genetic recombination. Novosibirsk: RIC NGU, 410 p. (about the author - on the last page of the cover)
- Beolens B. 2018. Eponym Dictionary of Odonata. Whittles Publishing. 480 p. (brief biography of Kosterina O. E.)
