= Gymnasura flavia =

Scientific classification
- Kingdom: Animalia
- Phylum: Arthropoda
- Class: Insecta
- Order: Lepidoptera
- Superfamily: Noctuoidea
- Family: Erebidae
- Subfamily: Arctiinae
- Genus: Gymnasura
- Species: G. flavia

Binomial name
- Gymnasura flavia (Hampson, 1900)

Synonyms
- Asura flavia Hampson, 1900; Pallene homoea Turner, 1940

Species of moth

Gymnasura flavia is a moth of the subfamily Arctiinae. It was described by George Hampson in 1900. It is found on New Guinea and in Queensland, Australia.
