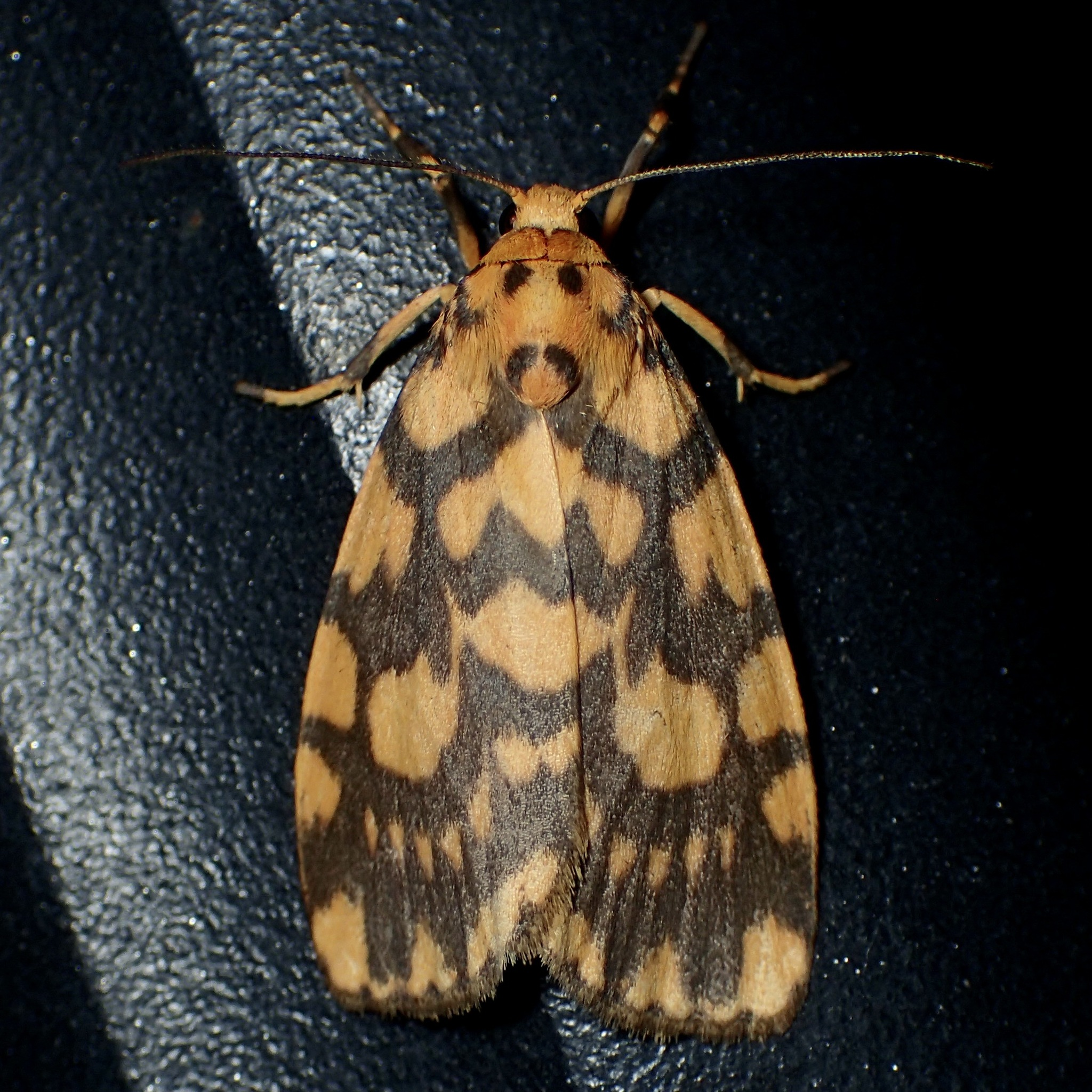
- Cyme quadrilineata, Australia

Scientific classification
- Kingdom: Animalia
- Phylum: Arthropoda
- Class: Insecta
- Order: Lepidoptera
- Superfamily: Noctuoidea
- Family: Erebidae
- Subfamily: Arctiinae
- Tribe: Lithosiini
- Subtribe: Nudariina
- Genus: Cyme
- Species: C. quadrilineata

Binomial name
- Cyme quadrilineata (Pagenstecher, 1886)

= Cyme quadrilineata =

Species of moth

Cyme quadrilineata is a species of butterfly in the moth family Erebidae, found in Australian, near northeastern and northern coast.
