= Cyme xantherythra =

Scientific classification
- Kingdom: Animalia
- Phylum: Arthropoda
- Class: Insecta
- Order: Lepidoptera
- Superfamily: Noctuoidea
- Family: Erebidae
- Subfamily: Arctiinae
- Tribe: Lithosiini
- Subtribe: Nudariina
- Genus: Cyme
- Species: C. xantherythra

Binomial name
- Cyme xantherythra (Hampson, 1900)

Synonyms
- Asura xantherythra Hampson, 1900

Species of moth

Cyme xantherythra is a moth of the subfamily Arctiinae first described by George Hampson in 1900. It is found in New Guinea.
