= Lyclene hollowai =

Scientific classification
- Domain: Eukaryota
- Kingdom: Animalia
- Phylum: Arthropoda
- Class: Insecta
- Order: Lepidoptera
- Superfamily: Noctuoidea
- Family: Erebidae
- Subfamily: Arctiinae
- Genus: Lyclene
- Species: L. hollowai

Binomial name
- Lyclene hollowai Kirti & Gill, 2009

Species of moth

Lyclene hollowai is a moth of the family Erebidae. It was described by Jagbir Singh Kirti and Navneet Singh Gill in 2009 and can be found in Gujarat, India.

The wingspan is about 22 mm.

== Etymology ==
The species is named in honour of Dr Jeremy D. Holloway.
