= Cyme pyrrhauloides =

Scientific classification
- Domain: Eukaryota
- Kingdom: Animalia
- Phylum: Arthropoda
- Class: Insecta
- Order: Lepidoptera
- Superfamily: Noctuoidea
- Family: Erebidae
- Subfamily: Arctiinae
- Genus: Cyme
- Species: C. pyrrhauloides

Binomial name
- Cyme pyrrhauloides (Rothschild, 1913)

Synonyms
- Asura pyrrhauloides Rothschild, 1913; Asura pyrauloides

Species of moth

Cyme pyrrhauloides is a moth of the family Erebidae. It is found in New Guinea.
