= Lyclene postseriata =

Scientific classification
- Kingdom: Animalia
- Phylum: Arthropoda
- Clade: Pancrustacea
- Class: Insecta
- Order: Lepidoptera
- Superfamily: Noctuoidea
- Family: Erebidae
- Subfamily: Arctiinae
- Genus: Lyclene
- Species: L. postseriata

Binomial name
- Lyclene postseriata Holloway, 2001

Species of moth from Borneo

Lyclene postseriata is a moth of the subfamily Arctiinae. It was described by Jeremy Daniel Holloway in 2001. It is found on Borneo. The habitat consists of lowland and lower montane forests on limestone.

The length of the forewings is 9–10 mm.
