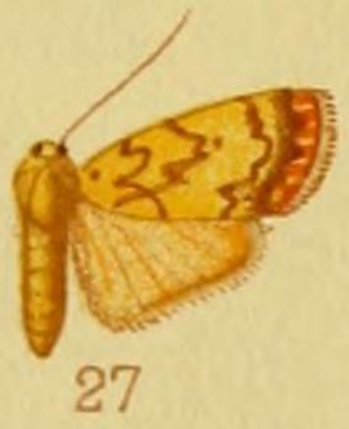
- Female

Scientific classification
- Domain: Eukaryota
- Kingdom: Animalia
- Phylum: Arthropoda
- Class: Insecta
- Order: Lepidoptera
- Superfamily: Noctuoidea
- Family: Erebidae
- Subfamily: Arctiinae
- Genus: Cyme
- Species: C. coccineotermen

Binomial name
- Cyme coccineotermen (Rothschild, 1913)

Synonyms
- Miltochrista coccineotermen Rothschild, 1913; Asura coccineotermen Hampson, 1914

= Cyme coccineotermen =

Species of moth

Cyme coccineotermen is a moth of the family Erebidae first described by Walter Rothschild in 1913. It is found in Papua New Guinea.
