= Striatochrista nigralba =

Scientific classification
- Kingdom: Animalia
- Phylum: Arthropoda
- Class: Insecta
- Order: Lepidoptera
- Superfamily: Noctuoidea
- Family: Erebidae
- Subfamily: Arctiinae
- Genus: Striatochrista
- Species: S. nigralba

Binomial name
- Striatochrista nigralba (Hampson, 1894)

Synonyms
- Barsine nigralba (Hampson, 1894); Miltochrista nigralba Hampson, 1894; Striatella nigralba (Hampson, 1894)

Species of moth

Striatochrista nigralba is a species in the moth family Erebidae, found in Southeast Asia.
