= Lyclene falciseriata =

Scientific classification
- Kingdom: Animalia
- Phylum: Arthropoda
- Clade: Pancrustacea
- Class: Insecta
- Order: Lepidoptera
- Superfamily: Noctuoidea
- Family: Erebidae
- Subfamily: Arctiinae
- Genus: Lyclene
- Species: L. falciseriata

Binomial name
- Lyclene falciseriata Holloway, 2001

Species of moth

Lyclene falciseriata is a moth of the family Erebidae. It was described by Jeremy Daniel Holloway in 2001. It is found on Borneo. The habitat consists of lowland dipterocarp forests, extending up to the lower montane zone at 1,000 meters.

The length of the forewings is 7–9 mm.
