= Lyclene unguifera =

Scientific classification
- Kingdom: Animalia
- Phylum: Arthropoda
- Clade: Pancrustacea
- Class: Insecta
- Order: Lepidoptera
- Superfamily: Noctuoidea
- Family: Erebidae
- Subfamily: Arctiinae
- Genus: Lyclene
- Species: L. unguifera

Binomial name
- Lyclene unguifera Holloway, 2001

Species of moth

Lyclene unguifera is a moth of the subfamily Arctiinae. It was described by Jeremy Daniel Holloway in 2001. It is found on Borneo. The habitat consists of lower montane forests at altitudes ranging from 500 to 1,620 meters.

The length of the forewings is 7–8 mm for males and 8–10 mm for females.
