= Lyclene kontumica =

Scientific classification
- Kingdom: Animalia
- Phylum: Arthropoda
- Clade: Pancrustacea
- Class: Insecta
- Order: Lepidoptera
- Superfamily: Noctuoidea
- Family: Erebidae
- Subfamily: Arctiinae
- Genus: Lyclene
- Species: L. kontumica

Binomial name
- Lyclene kontumica Dubatolov & Bucsek, 2013

Species of moth

Lyclene kontumica is a moth of the subfamily Arctiinae. It was described by Vladimir Viktorovitch Dubatolov and Karol Bucsek in 2013. It is found in Vietnam.
