= Lyclene quadrata =

Scientific classification
- Kingdom: Animalia
- Phylum: Arthropoda
- Clade: Pancrustacea
- Class: Insecta
- Order: Lepidoptera
- Superfamily: Noctuoidea
- Family: Erebidae
- Subfamily: Arctiinae
- Genus: Lyclene
- Species: L. quadrata

Binomial name
- Lyclene quadrata Holloway, 2001

Species of moth

Lyclene quadrata is a moth of the subfamily Arctiinae. It was described by Jeremy Daniel Holloway in 2001. It is found on Borneo and possibly Peninsular Malaysia. The habitat consists of lowland and lower montane forests, as well as coastal localities and areas of disturbed forest.

The length of the forewings is 7–8 mm.
