= Lyclene obscurilinea =

Scientific classification
- Kingdom: Animalia
- Phylum: Arthropoda
- Clade: Pancrustacea
- Class: Insecta
- Order: Lepidoptera
- Superfamily: Noctuoidea
- Family: Erebidae
- Subfamily: Arctiinae
- Genus: Lyclene
- Species: L. obscurilinea

Binomial name
- Lyclene obscurilinea Holloway, 2001

Species of moth

Lyclene obscurilinea is a moth of the subfamily Arctiinae. It was described by Jeremy Daniel Holloway in 2001. It is found on Borneo. The habitat consists of montane forests at altitudes ranging from 1,500 to about 2,000 meters.

The length of the forewings is 11–13 mm for males and 13–14 mm for females.
