= Lyclene apiseriata =

Scientific classification
- Kingdom: Animalia
- Phylum: Arthropoda
- Clade: Pancrustacea
- Class: Insecta
- Order: Lepidoptera
- Superfamily: Noctuoidea
- Family: Erebidae
- Subfamily: Arctiinae
- Genus: Lyclene
- Species: L. apiseriata

Binomial name
- Lyclene apiseriata Holloway, 2001

Species of moth

Lyclene apiseriata is a species of lichen moths of the family Erebidae, subfamily Arctiinae. It was described by Jeremy Daniel Holloway in 2001. It is found on Borneo. The habitat consists of lower montane forests on limestone.

The length of the forewings is 8–9 mm.
