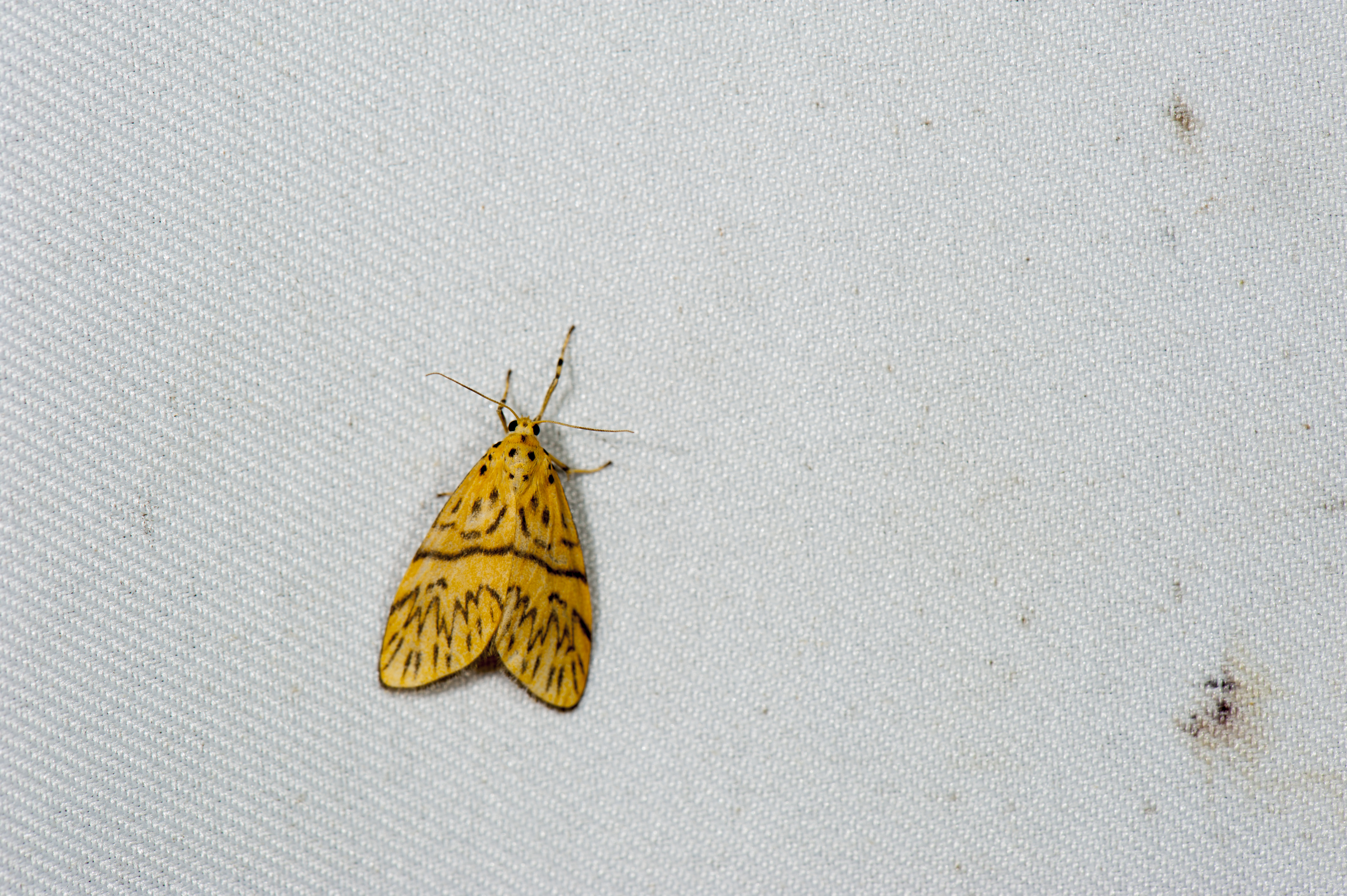

Scientific classification
- Kingdom: Animalia
- Phylum: Arthropoda
- Clade: Pancrustacea
- Class: Insecta
- Order: Lepidoptera
- Superfamily: Noctuoidea
- Family: Erebidae
- Subfamily: Arctiinae
- Genus: Barsine
- Species: B. takamukui

Binomial name
- Barsine takamukui (Matsumura, 1927)

Synonyms
- Miltochrista takamukui Matsumura, 1927; Barsine takamukui (Matsumura, 1927)

= Striatochrista takamukui =

Species of moth

Striatochrista takamukui is a moth of the family Erebidae. It was described by Shōnen Matsumura in 1927. It is found in Taiwan.
