= Striatochrista radians =

Scientific classification
- Domain: Eukaryota
- Kingdom: Animalia
- Phylum: Arthropoda
- Class: Insecta
- Order: Lepidoptera
- Superfamily: Noctuoidea
- Family: Erebidae
- Subfamily: Arctiinae
- Genus: Striatochrista
- Species: S. radians

Binomial name
- Striatochrista radians (Moore, 1878)

Synonyms
- Barsine radians (Moore, 1878); Lyclene radians Moore, 1878; Miltochrista radians (Moore, 1878); Striatella radians (Moore, 1878)

Species of moth

Striatochrista radians is a species in the moth family Erebidae.
