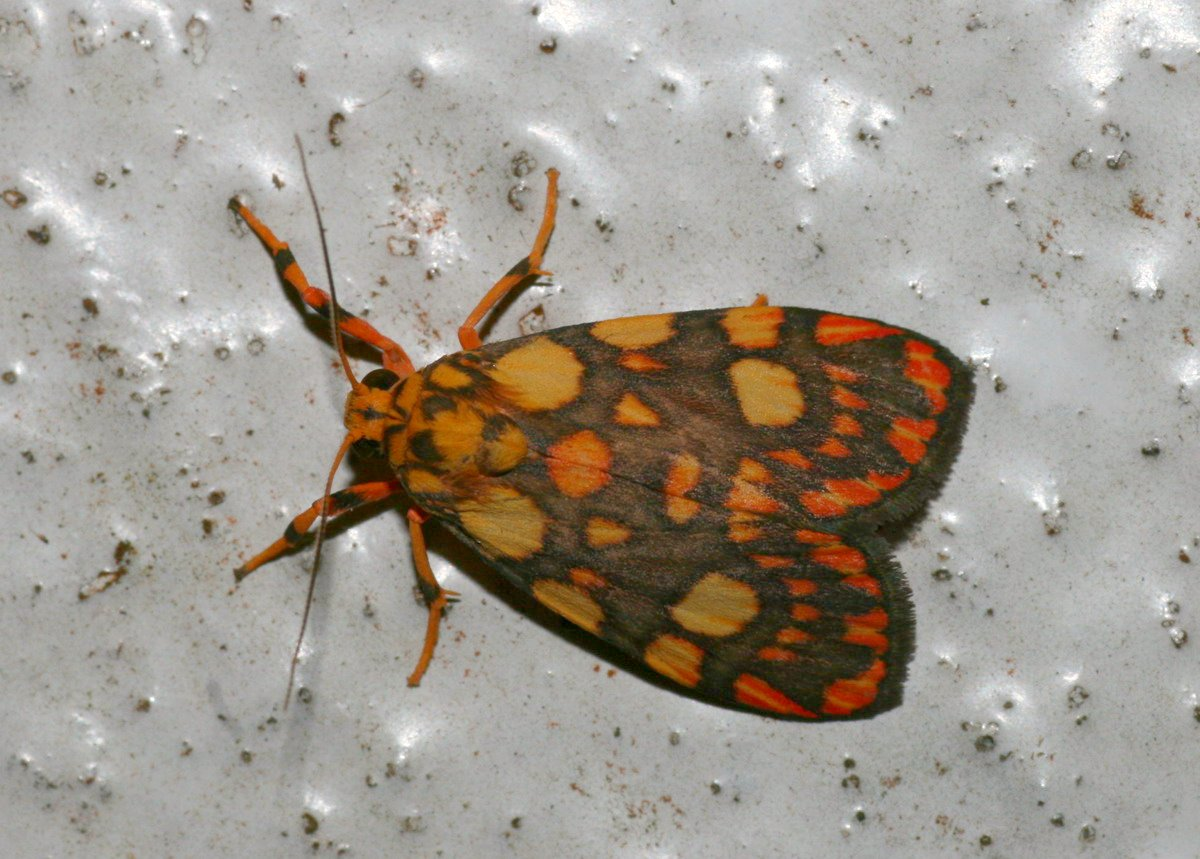

Scientific classification
- Kingdom: Animalia
- Phylum: Arthropoda
- Class: Insecta
- Order: Lepidoptera
- Superfamily: Noctuoidea
- Family: Erebidae
- Subfamily: Arctiinae
- Genus: Lyclene
- Species: L. reticulata

Binomial name
- Lyclene reticulata (C. Felder, 1861)

Synonyms
- Cyme reticulata C. Felder, 1861; Barsine placens Walker, 1865; Calligenia cyclota Meyrick, 1886; Barsine intrita Swinhoe, 1892

= Lyclene reticulata =

Species of moth

Lyclene reticulata is a species of lichen moths of the family Erebidae, subfamily Arctiinae. It is found in Queensland, Australia, as well as on Ambon, Seram, Timor, Batchian, Aru, Tobriand, the Louisiade Archipelago and the Dampier Archipelago,

The wingspan is about 20 mm.

A sister species Cyme laeta, a native to New Guinea, was discovered in 2021.
