= Gymnasura saginaea =

Scientific classification
- Domain: Eukaryota
- Kingdom: Animalia
- Phylum: Arthropoda
- Class: Insecta
- Order: Lepidoptera
- Superfamily: Noctuoidea
- Family: Erebidae
- Subfamily: Arctiinae
- Genus: Gymnasura
- Species: G. saginaea

Binomial name
- Gymnasura saginaea (Turner, 1899)

Synonyms
- Calligenia saginaea Turner, 1899; Calligenia limonis Lucas, 1900; Lyclene eldola Swinhoe, 1901

Species of moth

Gymnasura saginaea is a moth of the subfamily Arctiinae. It was described by Alfred Jefferis Turner in 1899. It is found in Queensland, Australia.

Adults are pale yellow, with a network of dark lines across the forewings.
