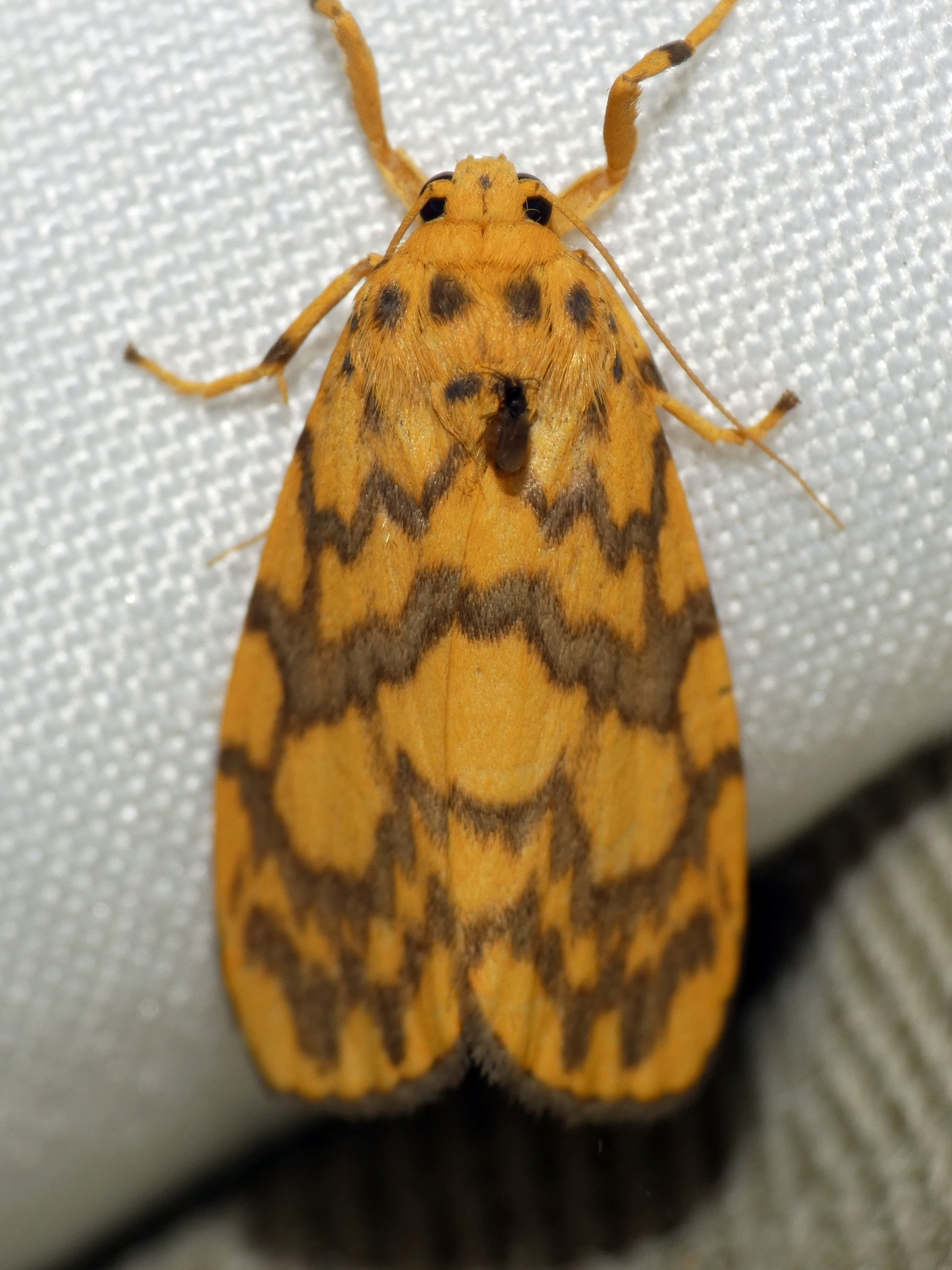
- Cyme pyraula, Australia

Scientific classification
- Kingdom: Animalia
- Phylum: Arthropoda
- Class: Insecta
- Order: Lepidoptera
- Superfamily: Noctuoidea
- Family: Erebidae
- Subfamily: Arctiinae
- Genus: Cyme
- Species: C. pyraula

Binomial name
- Cyme pyraula (Meyrick, 1886)

Synonyms
- Calligenia pyraula Meyrick, 1886; Asura pyraula; Lyclene pyraula

= Cyme pyraula =

Species of moth

Cyme pyraula is a moth of the family Erebidae first described by Edward Meyrick in 1886. It is found in the Australian state of Queensland and on New Guinea.

Adults are orange, with a various dark lines across the forewings.
