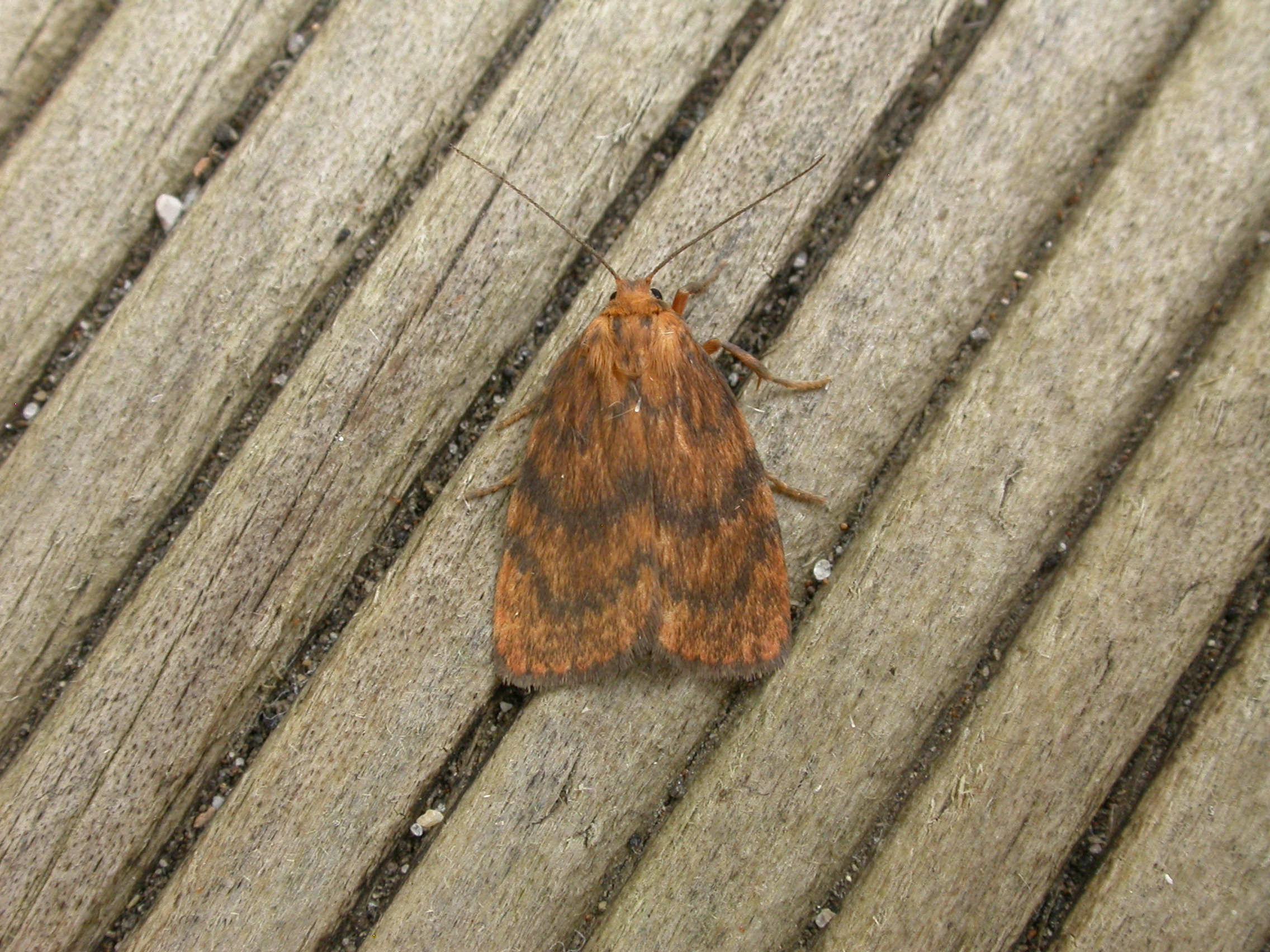

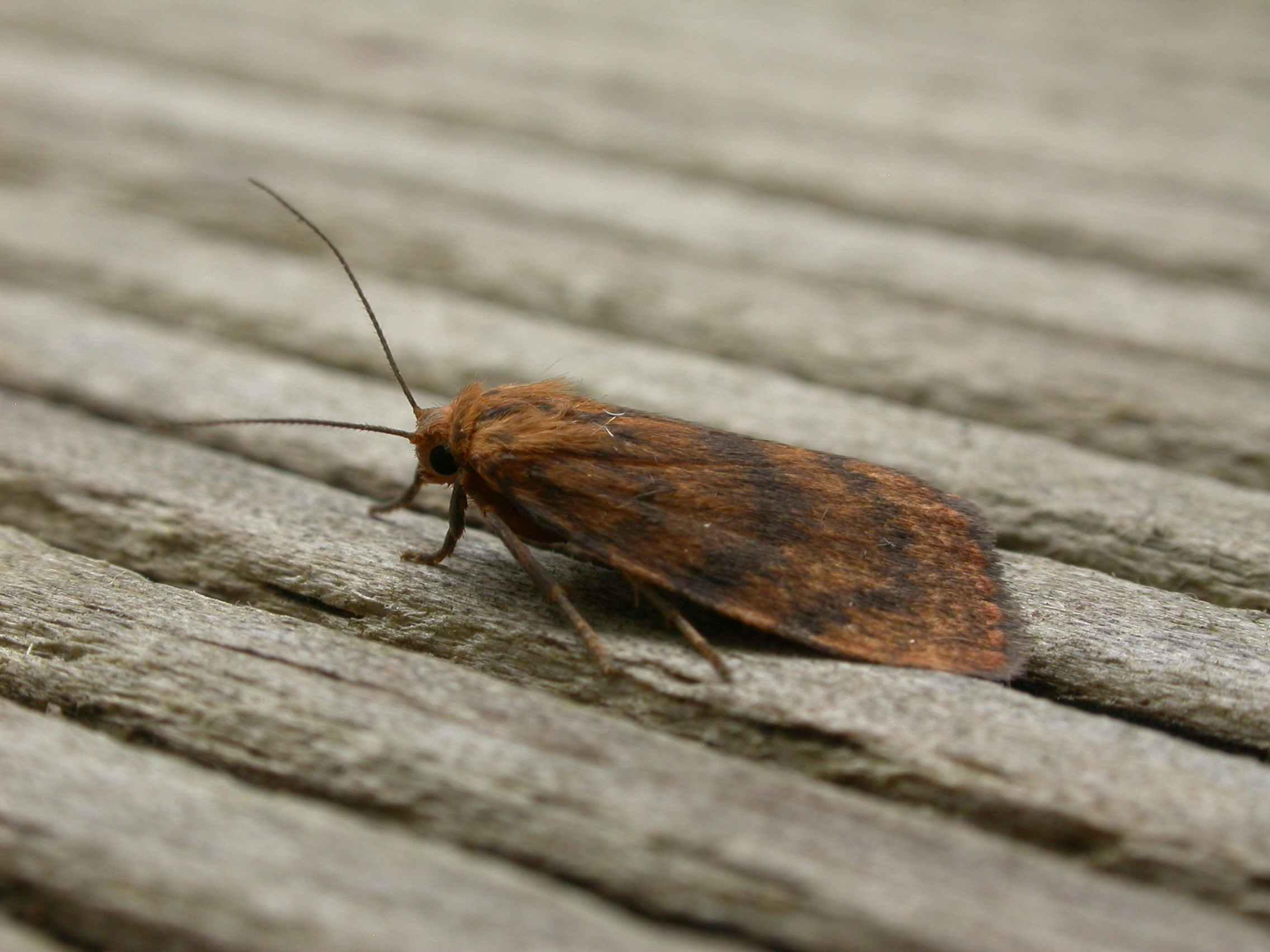

Scientific classification
- Kingdom: Animalia
- Phylum: Arthropoda
- Class: Insecta
- Order: Lepidoptera
- Superfamily: Noctuoidea
- Family: Erebidae
- Subfamily: Arctiinae
- Genus: Lyclene
- Species: L. structa

Binomial name
- Lyclene structa (Walker, 1854)

Synonyms
- Pallene structa Walker, 1854; Prinasura pyrrhopsamma Hampson, 1903

= Lyclene structa =

Species of moth

Lyclene structa is a species of moth of the subfamily Arctiinae first described by Francis Walker in 1854. It is found in the southern half of Australia (including New South Wales and Queensland).

The wingspan is about 20 mm.

The larvae have been found on wallaby faeces.
