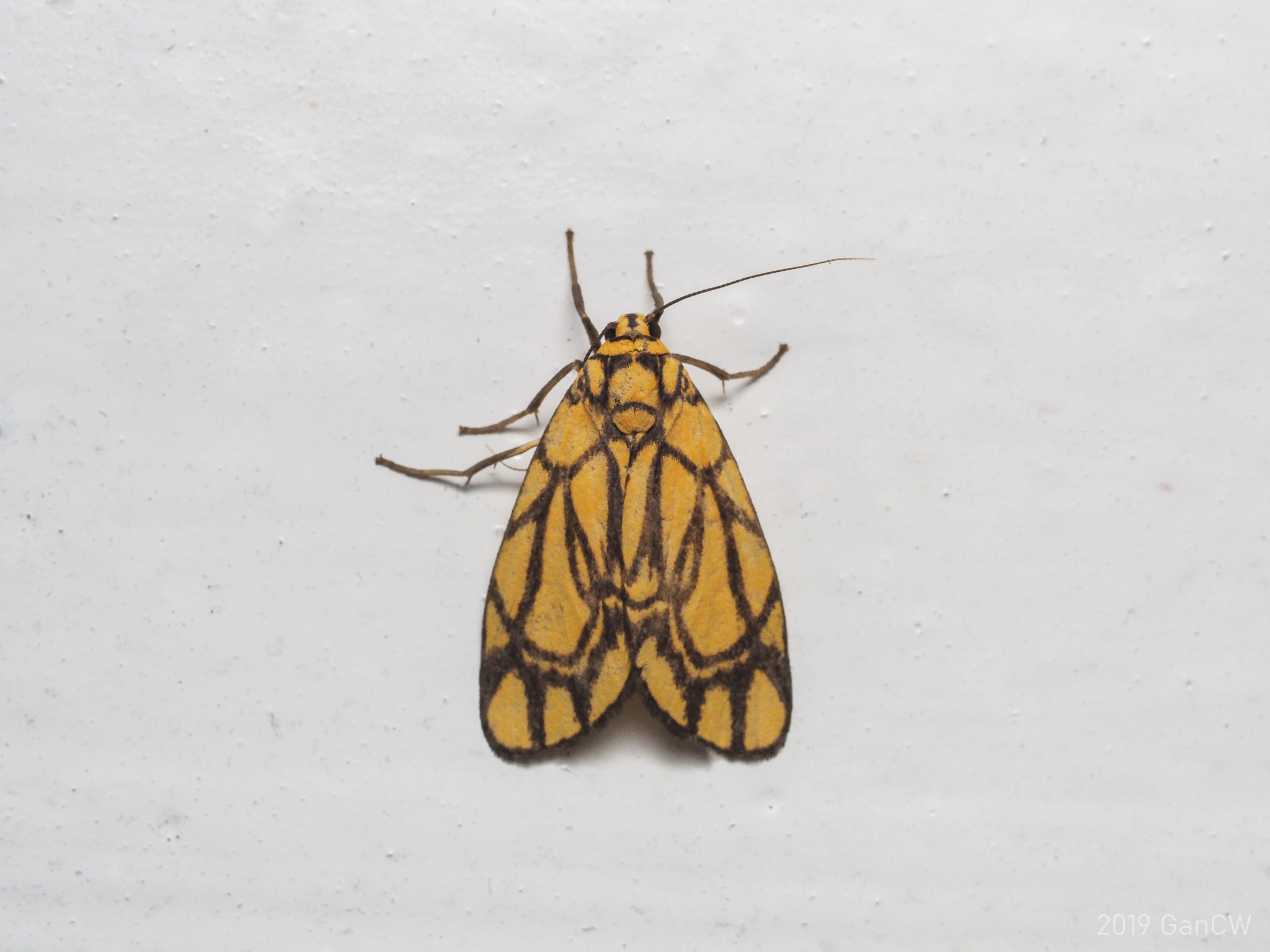
- Cyme euprepioides, Malaysia

Scientific classification
- Kingdom: Animalia
- Phylum: Arthropoda
- Class: Insecta
- Order: Lepidoptera
- Superfamily: Noctuoidea
- Family: Erebidae
- Subfamily: Arctiinae
- Genus: Cyme
- Species: C. euprepioides

Binomial name
- Cyme euprepioides (Walker, 1862)

Synonyms
- Hypocrita euprepioides Walker, 1862; Barsine euprepioides; Hypocrita inclusa Snellen, 1877; Lyclene interserta Moore, 1878; Asura euprepioides ab. samboanganus Strand, 1922

= Cyme euprepioides =

Species of moth

Cyme euprepioides is a species of moth of the family Erebidae. It is found on Borneo, Sumatra, Peninsular Malaysia and in the north-eastern Himalayas and the Philippines. The habitat consists of various lowland forest types.
