= Asura inconspicua =

Scientific classification
- Domain: Eukaryota
- Kingdom: Animalia
- Phylum: Arthropoda
- Class: Insecta
- Order: Lepidoptera
- Superfamily: Noctuoidea
- Family: Erebidae
- Subfamily: Arctiinae
- Genus: Asura
- Species: A. inconspicua

Binomial name
- Asura inconspicua (Moore, 1878)

Synonyms
- Lyclene inconspicua Moore, 1878; Miltochrista obliqua Hampson, 1891

Species of moth

Asura inconspicua is a moth of the family Erebidae first described by Frederic Moore in 1878. It is found in the Nilgiri Mountains of India.
