= Asura dharma =

Scientific classification
- Domain: Eukaryota
- Kingdom: Animalia
- Phylum: Arthropoda
- Class: Insecta
- Order: Lepidoptera
- Superfamily: Noctuoidea
- Family: Erebidae
- Subfamily: Arctiinae
- Genus: Asura
- Species: A. dharma

Binomial name
- Asura dharma (Moore, 1879)

Synonyms
- Setina dharma Moore, 1879; Miltochrista butleri Leech, 1888; Asura lacteoflava Rothschild, 1913

Species of moth

Asura dharma is a moth of the family Erebidae. It is found in Japan, India and China.
