= Miltochrista delicata =

Scientific classification
- Domain: Eukaryota
- Kingdom: Animalia
- Phylum: Arthropoda
- Class: Insecta
- Order: Lepidoptera
- Superfamily: Noctuoidea
- Family: Erebidae
- Subfamily: Arctiinae
- Genus: Miltochrista
- Species: M. delicata

Binomial name
- Miltochrista delicata (Moore, 1878)

Synonyms
- Lyclene delicata Moore, 1878; Barsine prominens (Moore, 1878)

Species of moth

Miltochrista delicata is a moth of the family Erebidae first described by Frederic Moore in 1878. It is found in Sikkim, India.
