= Asura floccosa =

Scientific classification
- Kingdom: Animalia
- Phylum: Arthropoda
- Class: Insecta
- Order: Lepidoptera
- Superfamily: Noctuoidea
- Family: Erebidae
- Subfamily: Arctiinae
- Genus: Asura
- Species: A. floccosa

Binomial name
- Asura floccosa (Walker, 1864)

Synonyms
- Nudaria floccosa Walker, 1864; Nudaria subcervina Walker, 1864

Species of moth

Asura floccosa is a moth of the family Erebidae. It is found in India (Sikkim, Calcutta, Ganjam, Madras, Coimbatore) and Sri Lanka.

== Description ==
Its wingspan is about 22 mm. Antennae of male ciliated. Female has semi-diaphanous pale brownish-ochreous body. Forewings with indistinct sub-basal and medial fuscous bands. There is a spot on the discocellulars. Postmedial and marginal speck series present.
