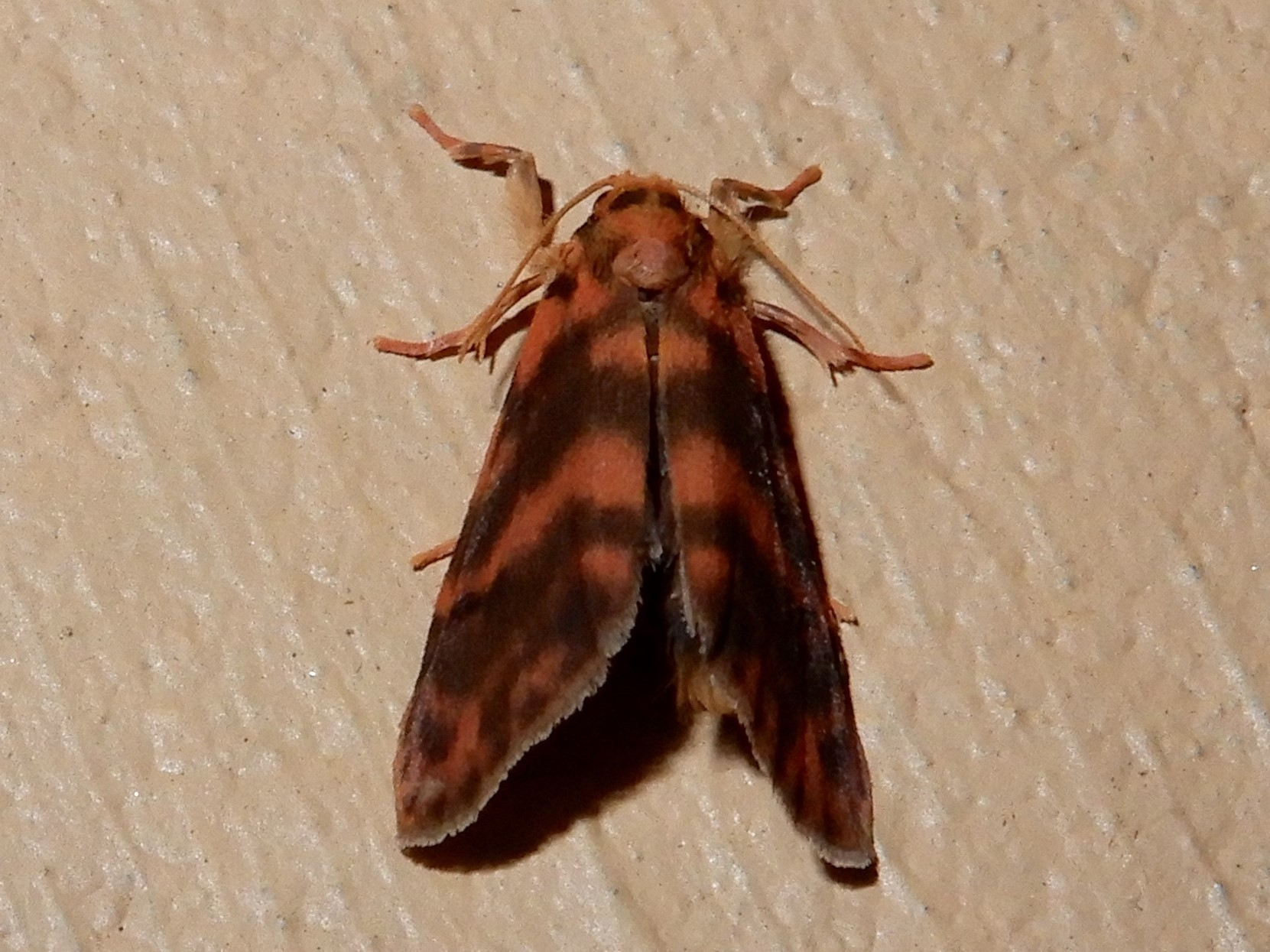

Scientific classification
- Kingdom: Animalia
- Phylum: Arthropoda
- Class: Insecta
- Order: Lepidoptera
- Superfamily: Noctuoidea
- Family: Erebidae
- Subfamily: Arctiinae
- Genus: Nephelomilta
- Species: N. suffusa

Binomial name
- Nephelomilta suffusa (Hampson, 1891)

Synonyms
- Lyclene suffusa Hampson, 1891

= Nephelomilta suffusa =

Species of moth

Nephelomilta suffusa is a species of moth in the subfamily Arctiinae. It is found in India (Nilgiris).
