= Striatochrista prominens =

Scientific classification
- Domain: Eukaryota
- Kingdom: Animalia
- Phylum: Arthropoda
- Class: Insecta
- Order: Lepidoptera
- Superfamily: Noctuoidea
- Family: Erebidae
- Subfamily: Arctiinae
- Genus: Striatochrista
- Species: S. prominens

Binomial name
- Striatochrista prominens (Moore, 1878)

Synonyms
- Barsine prominens (Moore, 1878); Lyclene prominens Moore, 1878; Miltochrista delicata Moore, 1878; Miltochrista prominens (Moore, 1878); Striatella prominens (Moore, 1878)

Species of moth

Striatochrista prominens is a species in the moth family Erebidae, found in southern Asia.
