= Asura congerens =

Scientific classification
- Domain: Eukaryota
- Kingdom: Animalia
- Phylum: Arthropoda
- Class: Insecta
- Order: Lepidoptera
- Superfamily: Noctuoidea
- Family: Erebidae
- Subfamily: Arctiinae
- Genus: Asura
- Species: A. congerens

Binomial name
- Asura congerens (Felder, 1874)

Synonyms
- Cymella congerens Felder, 1874; Lyclene arctocarpi Moore, 1878

Species of moth

Asura congerens is a moth of the family Erebidae first described by Felder in 1874. It is found in India's north-western Himalayas and Sikkim.
