= Asura simplifascia =

Scientific classification
- Domain: Eukaryota
- Kingdom: Animalia
- Phylum: Arthropoda
- Class: Insecta
- Order: Lepidoptera
- Superfamily: Noctuoidea
- Family: Erebidae
- Subfamily: Arctiinae
- Genus: Asura
- Species: A. simplifascia

Binomial name
- Asura simplifascia (Elwes, 1890)

Synonyms
- Lyclene simplifascia Elwes, 1890; Asura homogena Seitz, 1910; Lyclene simplicifascia Kirby, 1892

Species of moth

Asura simplifascia is a moth of the family Erebidae. It is found in India.
