= Asura strigipennis =

Scientific classification
- Domain: Eukaryota
- Kingdom: Animalia
- Phylum: Arthropoda
- Class: Insecta
- Order: Lepidoptera
- Superfamily: Noctuoidea
- Family: Erebidae
- Subfamily: Arctiinae
- Genus: Asura
- Species: A. strigipennis

Binomial name
- Asura strigipennis (Herrich-Schäffer, 1914)

Synonyms
- Paidia strigipennis Herrich-Schäffer, 1855; Lyclene discistriga Moore, 1878; Lyclene scripta Heylaerts, 1891; Miltochrista sinica Moore, 1877; Lyclene terminata Moore, 1878; Lyclene fruhstorferi Aurivillius, 1894

Species of moth

Asura strigipennis is a moth of the family Erebidae. It was described by Gottlieb August Wilhelm Herrich-Schäffer in 1914. It is found on Java, Sumatra and in China (Shanghai, Zhejiang), Taiwan and India (Sikkim, Assam).
