= Asura rubricosa =

Scientific classification
- Domain: Eukaryota
- Kingdom: Animalia
- Phylum: Arthropoda
- Class: Insecta
- Order: Lepidoptera
- Superfamily: Noctuoidea
- Family: Erebidae
- Subfamily: Arctiinae
- Genus: Asura
- Species: A. rubricosa

Binomial name
- Asura rubricosa (Moore, 1878)

Synonyms
- Lyclene rubricosa Moore, 1878; Lyclene curvifascia Hampson; Lyclene ochracea Hampson, 1891

Species of moth

Asura rubricosa is a moth of the family Erebidae. It is found in India and Sri Lanka.

== Description ==
Forewings with broad cell. Antennae of male ciliated. Forewings with a series of postmedial blotches conjoined into a band, more irregular and without spots beyond it. The medial band is widely separated from the antemedial band. Hindwings pinkish, some specimen possess traces of a medial band.
