= Asura quadrilineata =

Scientific classification
- Domain: Eukaryota
- Kingdom: Animalia
- Phylum: Arthropoda
- Class: Insecta
- Order: Lepidoptera
- Superfamily: Noctuoidea
- Family: Erebidae
- Subfamily: Arctiinae
- Genus: Asura
- Species: A. quadrilineata

Binomial name
- Asura quadrilineata (Pagenstecher, 1886)

Synonyms
- Calligenia quadrilineata Pagenstecher, 1886; Lyclene quadrilineata; Prinasura quadrilineata; Miltochrista simulans Butler, 1886; ?Calligenia melitaula Meyrick, 1886

Species of moth

Asura quadrilineata is a moth of the family Erebidae. It is found on Aru and in Australia (the Northern Territory and Queensland).

== Subspecies ==
- Asura quadrilineata quadrilineata
- Asura quadrilineata moluccensis van Eecke, 1929 (Buru)
