= Catocala seibaldi =

Scientific classification
- Kingdom: Animalia
- Phylum: Arthropoda
- Clade: Pancrustacea
- Class: Insecta
- Order: Lepidoptera
- Superfamily: Noctuoidea
- Family: Erebidae
- Genus: Catocala
- Species: C. seibaldi

Binomial name
- Catocala seibaldi Saldaitis, Ivinskis & Borth, 2010

Synonyms
- Catocala pseudoformosana Ishizuka, 2010

Species of moth

Catocala seibaldi is a moth in the family Erebidae. It is known from Shaanxi and southern Gansu in Northwestern China. It is named for Helmut Seibald.

Catocala seibaldi and Catocala pseudoformosana were described in the same journal at the same time, but the species descriptions show that they are the same species. Because of the more extensive type material of Catocala seibaldi compared to Catocala pseudoformosana, Behounek elected to give the former species precedence and treat the latter as synonym.

The forewing length is 27–36 mm (1.1–1.4 in). It resembles Catocala butleri and Catocala formosana (hence the name C. pseudoformosana by Ishizuka).
