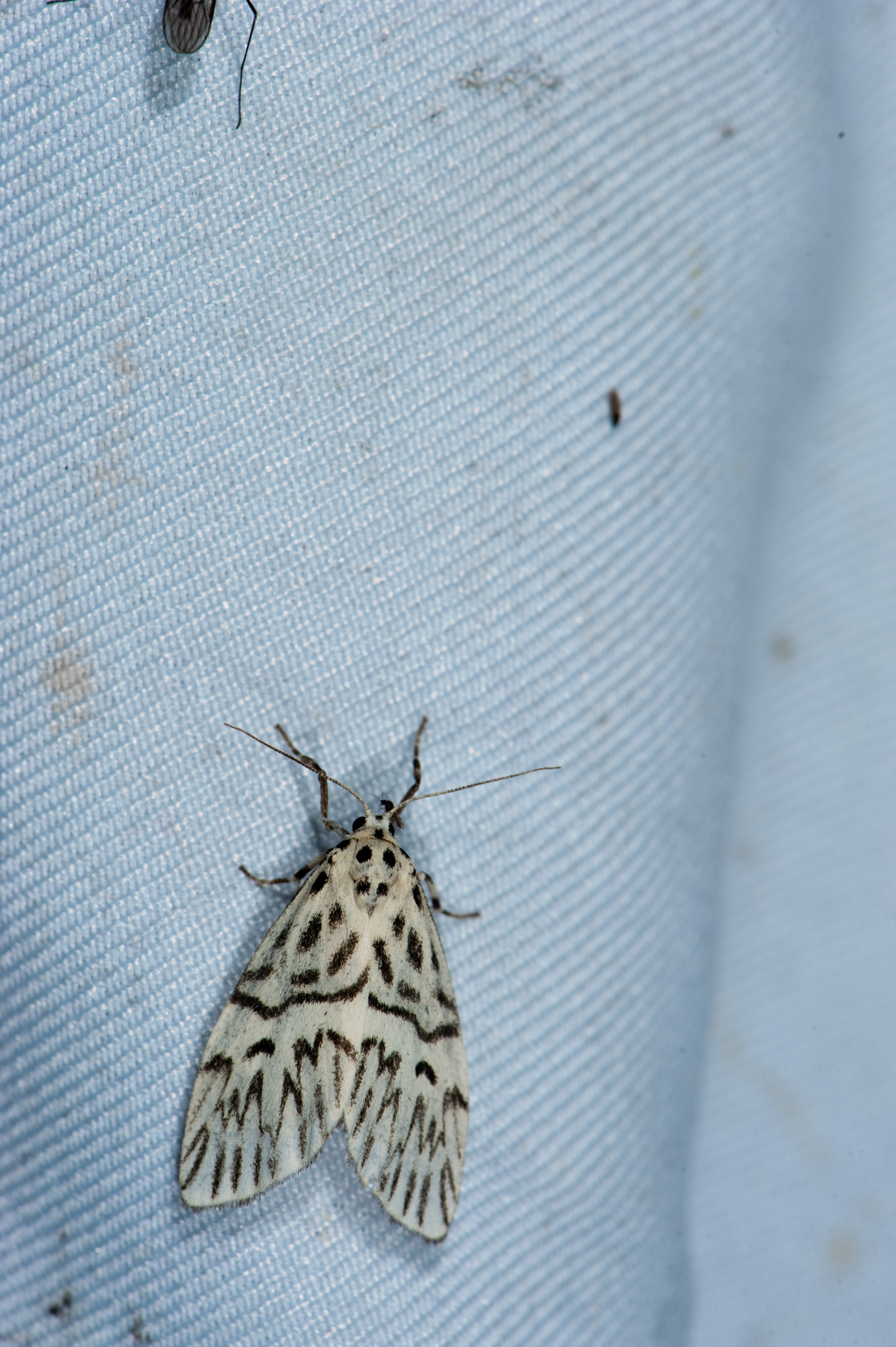

Scientific classification
- Kingdom: Animalia
- Phylum: Arthropoda
- Clade: Pancrustacea
- Class: Insecta
- Order: Lepidoptera
- Superfamily: Noctuoidea
- Family: Erebidae
- Subfamily: Arctiinae
- Genus: Miltochrista
- Species: M. karenkonis

Binomial name
- Miltochrista karenkonis Matsumura, 1930

= Miltochrista karenkonis =

Species of moth

Miltochrista karenkonis is a moth of the family Erebidae. It was described by Shōnen Matsumura in 1930. It is found in Taiwan.

Lepidoptera and Some Other Life Forms gives this name as a synonym of Stigmatophora karenkonis (Matsumura, 1930).
