= Miltochrista expressa =

Scientific classification
- Kingdom: Animalia
- Phylum: Arthropoda
- Class: Insecta
- Order: Lepidoptera
- Superfamily: Noctuoidea
- Family: Erebidae
- Subfamily: Arctiinae
- Genus: Miltochrista
- Species: M. expressa

Binomial name
- Miltochrista expressa Inoue, 1988

Synonyms
- Miltochrista aberrans okinawana Inoue, 1980 (nec Matsumura)

Species of moth

Miltochrista expressa is a moth of the family Erebidae. It was described by Hiroshi Inoue in 1988. It is found in Taiwan.

See transfer to Aberrasine expressa (Inoue, 1988)); Volynkin, Huang & Ivanova, 2019
