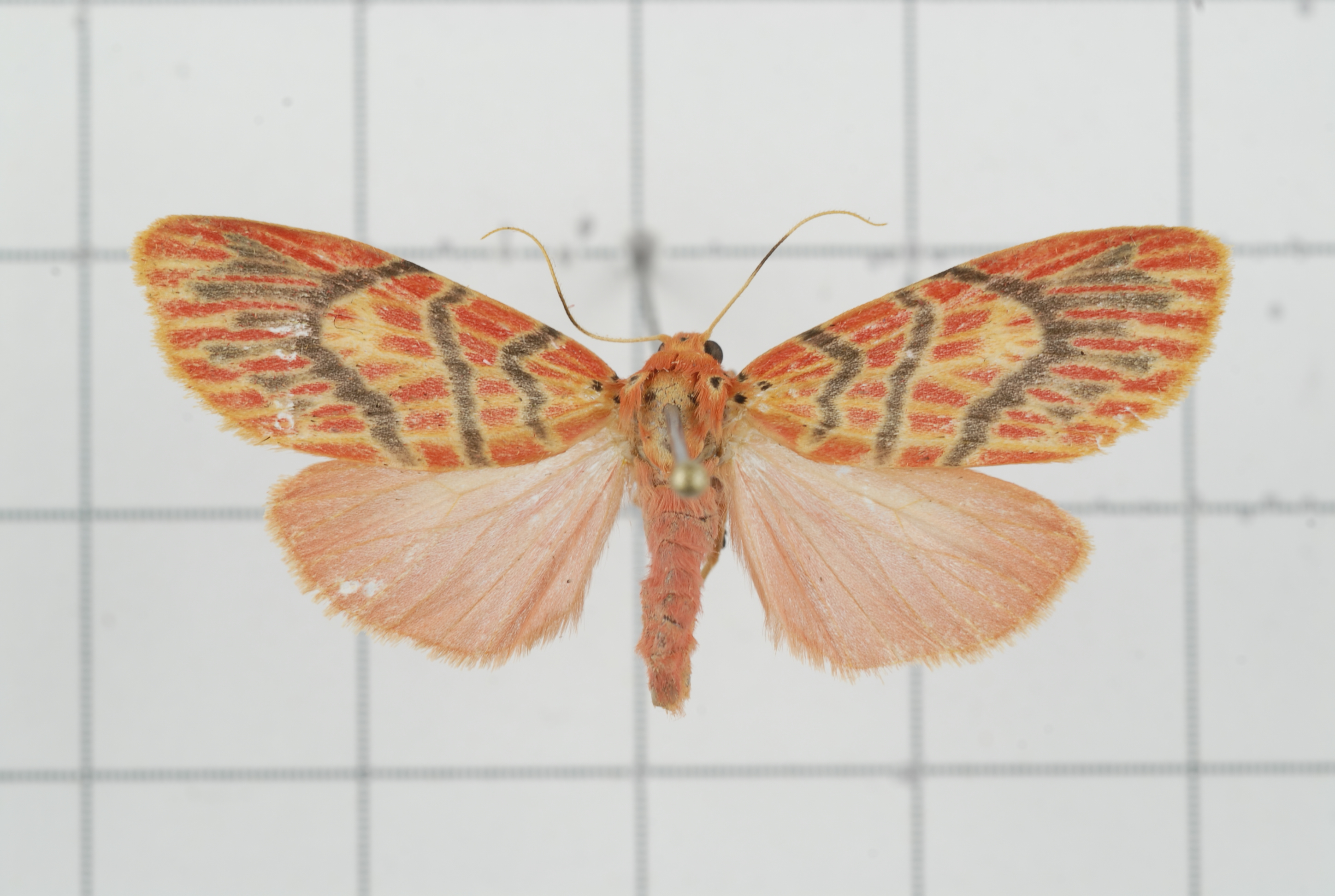

Scientific classification
- Domain: Eukaryota
- Kingdom: Animalia
- Phylum: Arthropoda
- Class: Insecta
- Order: Lepidoptera
- Superfamily: Noctuoidea
- Family: Erebidae
- Subfamily: Arctiinae
- Genus: Miltochrista
- Species: M. sauteri

Binomial name
- Miltochrista sauteri Strand, 1917

Synonyms
- Hypocrita meander Snellen, 1879

= Miltochrista sauteri =

Species of moth

Miltochrista sauteri is a moth of the family Erebidae. It was described by Strand in 1917. It is found in Taiwan.
