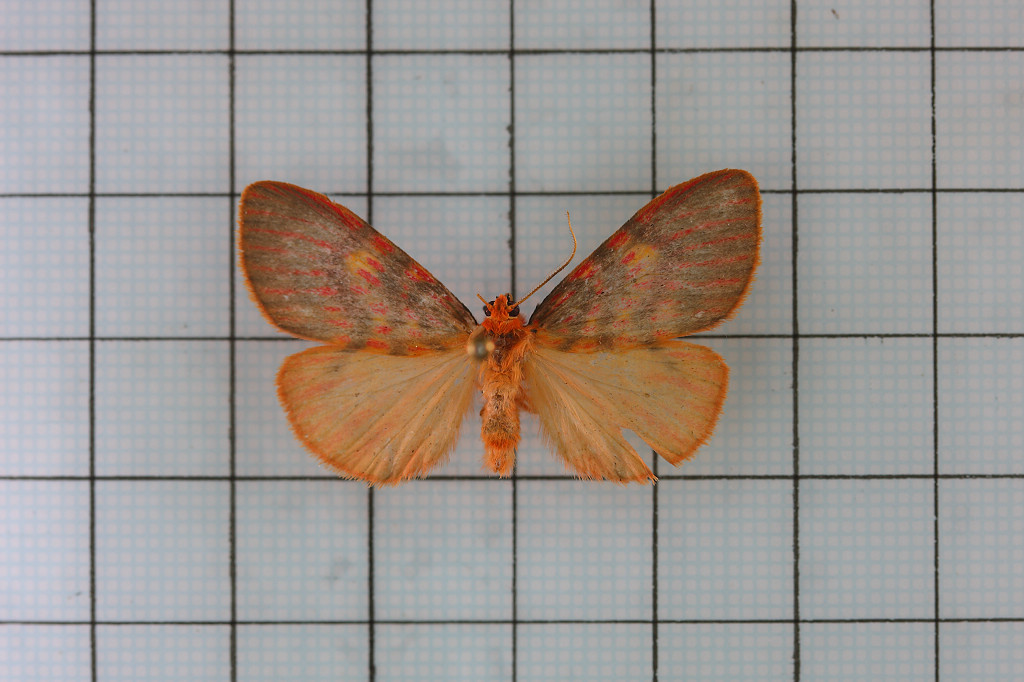

Scientific classification
- Domain: Eukaryota
- Kingdom: Animalia
- Phylum: Arthropoda
- Class: Insecta
- Order: Lepidoptera
- Superfamily: Noctuoidea
- Family: Erebidae
- Subfamily: Arctiinae
- Genus: Miltochrista
- Species: M. fuscozonata

Binomial name
- Miltochrista fuscozonata (Matsumura, 1931)

Synonyms
- Barsine fuscozonata (Matsumura, 1931)

= Miltochrista fuscozonata =

Species of moth

Miltochrista fuscozonata is a moth of the family Erebidae first described by Shōnen Matsumura in 1931. It is found in Taiwan.
