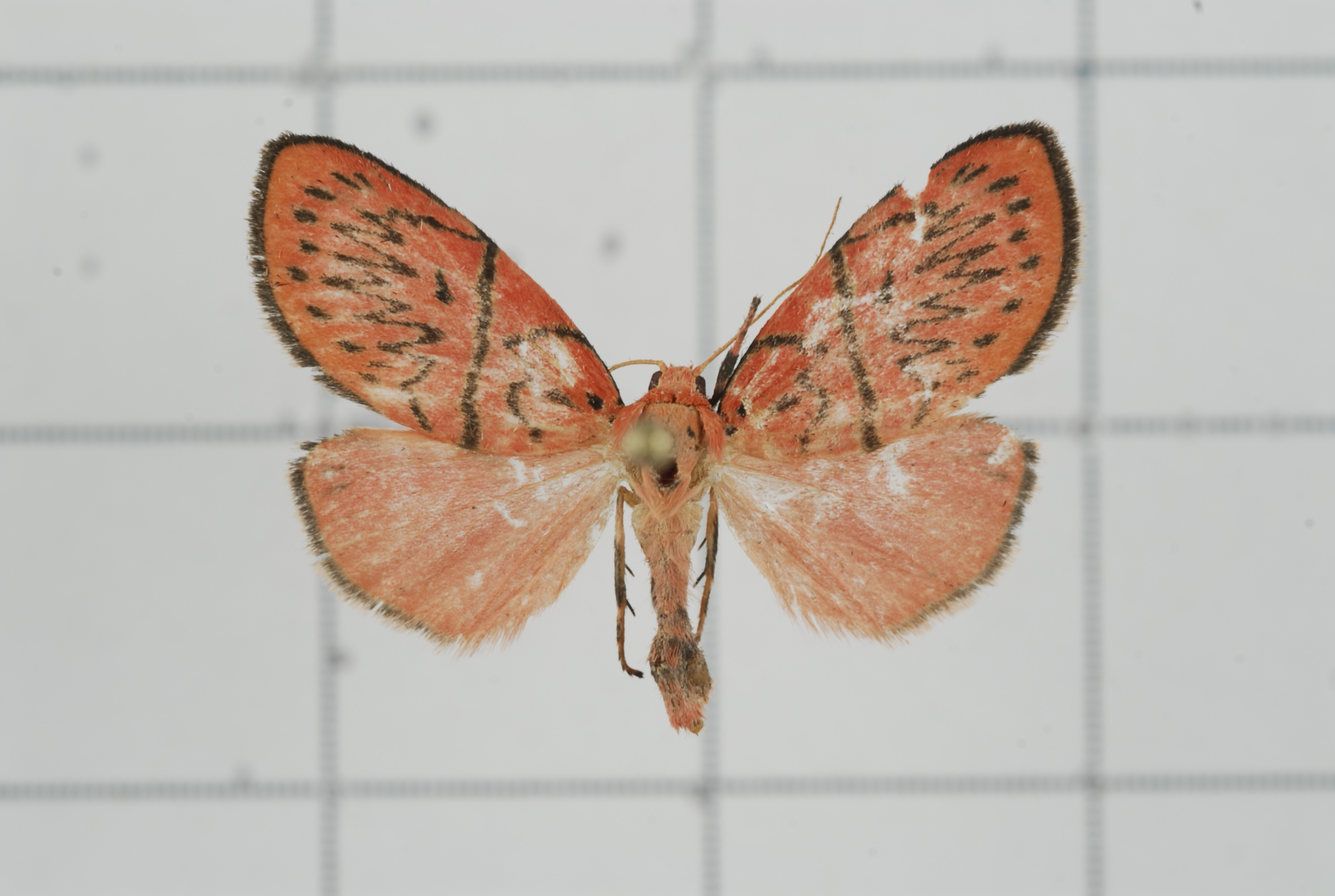

Scientific classification
- Domain: Eukaryota
- Kingdom: Animalia
- Phylum: Arthropoda
- Class: Insecta
- Order: Lepidoptera
- Superfamily: Noctuoidea
- Family: Erebidae
- Subfamily: Arctiinae
- Genus: Miltochrista
- Species: M. dentata

Binomial name
- Miltochrista dentata Wileman, 1910

= Miltochrista dentata =

Species of moth

Miltochrista dentata is a moth of the family Erebidae. It was described by Wileman in 1910. It is found in Taiwan.
