= Miltochrista postnigra =

Scientific classification
- Kingdom: Animalia
- Phylum: Arthropoda
- Class: Insecta
- Order: Lepidoptera
- Superfamily: Noctuoidea
- Family: Erebidae
- Subfamily: Arctiinae
- Genus: Miltochrista
- Species: M. postnigra

Binomial name
- Miltochrista postnigra Hampson, 1894

Synonyms
- Barsine postnigra (Hampson, 1894)

Species of moth

Miltochrista postnigra is a moth of the family Erebidae. It was described by George Hampson in 1894. It is found in Sikkim, India.
