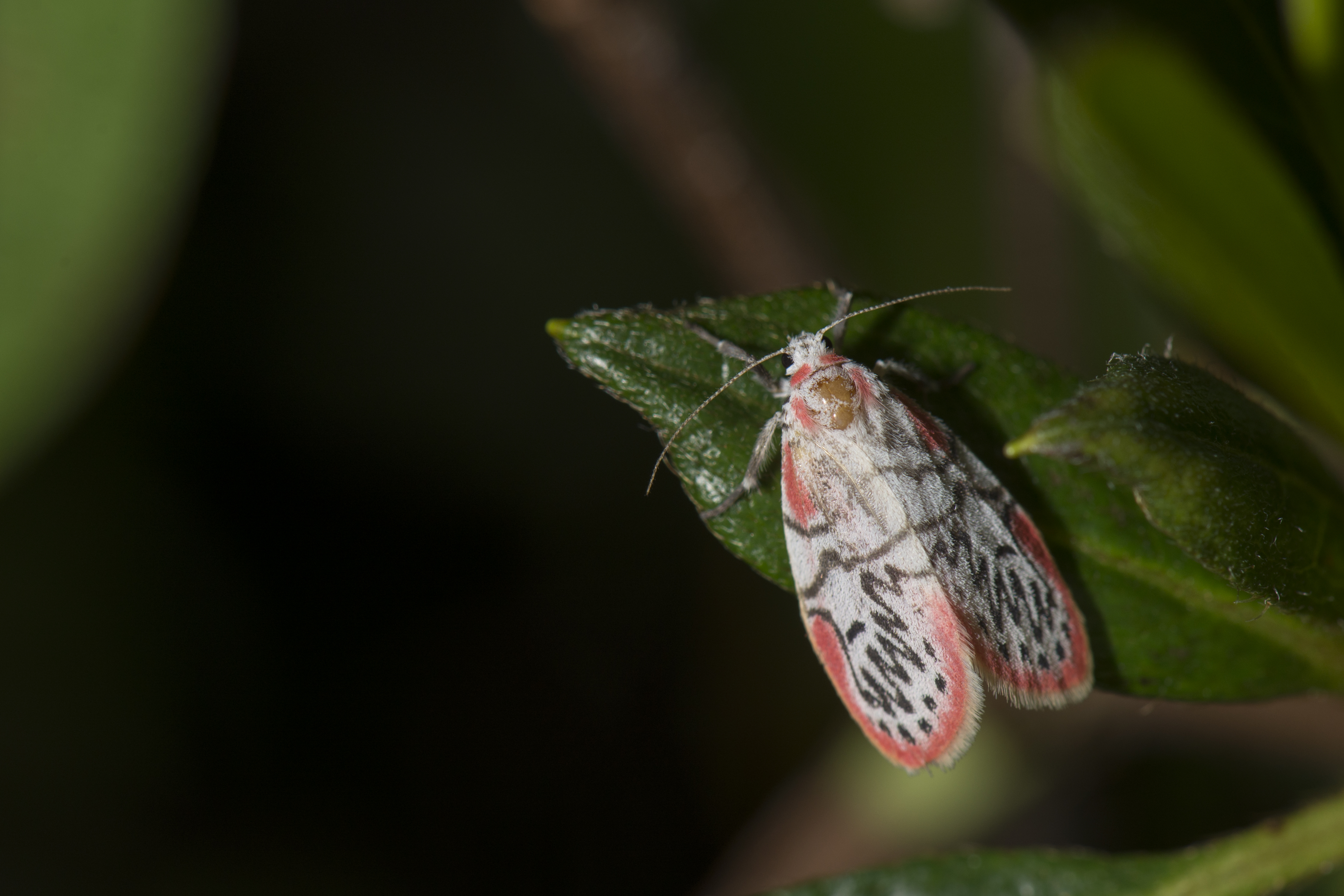

Scientific classification
- Kingdom: Animalia
- Phylum: Arthropoda
- Class: Insecta
- Order: Lepidoptera
- Superfamily: Noctuoidea
- Family: Erebidae
- Subfamily: Arctiinae
- Genus: Miltochrista
- Species: M. ziczac

Binomial name
- Miltochrista ziczac (Walker, 1856)

Synonyms
- Hypoprepia ziczac Walker, 1856; Miltochrista rivalis Leech, 1890

= Miltochrista ziczac =

Species of moth

Miltochrista ziczac is a moth of the family Erebidae. It was described by Francis Walker in 1856. It is found in China.
