= Miltochrista flexuosa =

Scientific classification
- Domain: Eukaryota
- Kingdom: Animalia
- Phylum: Arthropoda
- Class: Insecta
- Order: Lepidoptera
- Superfamily: Noctuoidea
- Family: Erebidae
- Subfamily: Arctiinae
- Genus: Miltochrista
- Species: M. flexuosa

Binomial name
- Miltochrista flexuosa Leech, 1899

Species of moth

Miltochrista flexuosa is a moth of the family Erebidae. It was described by John Henry Leech in 1899. It is found in western China.
