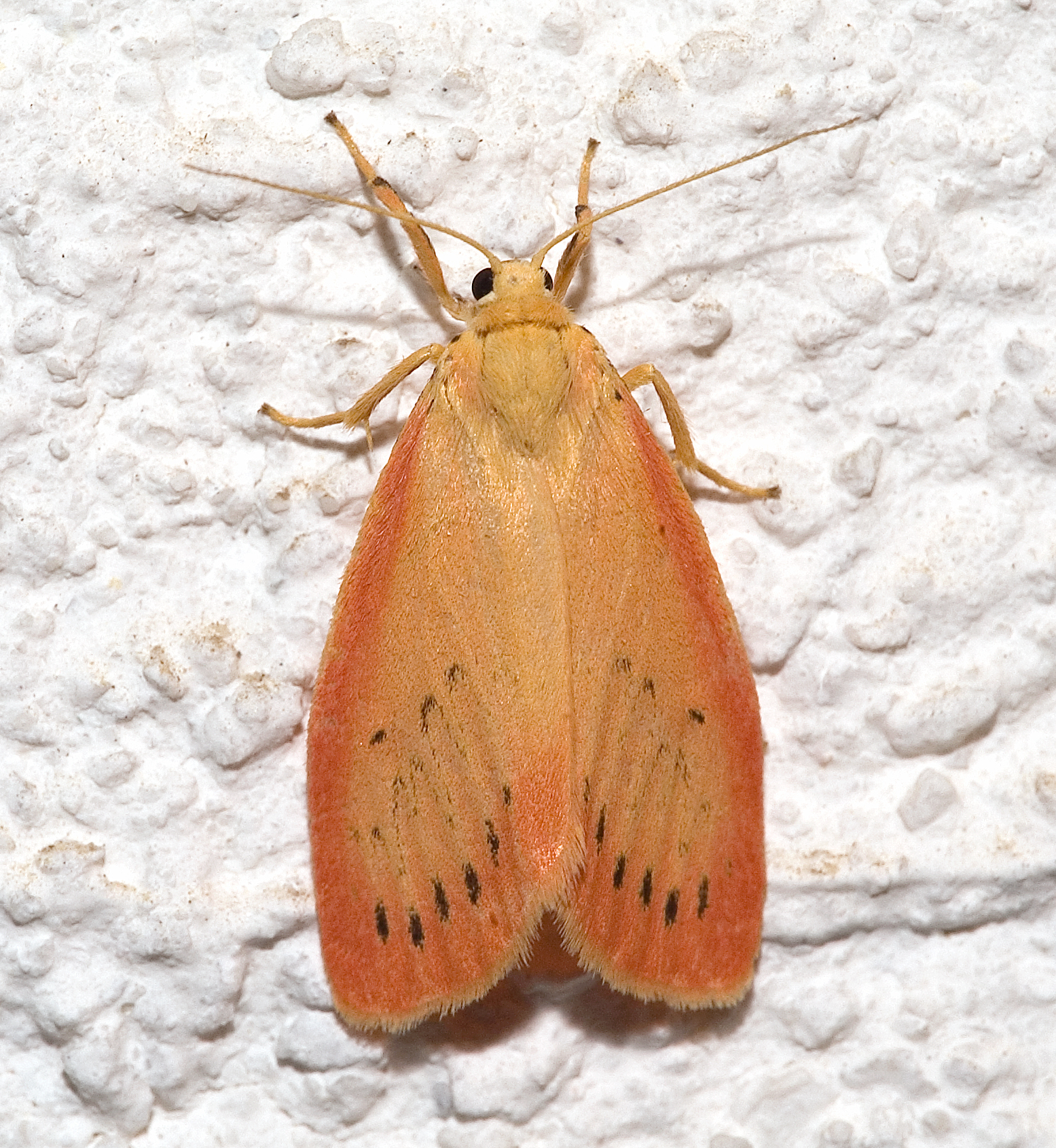

Scientific classification
- Kingdom: Animalia
- Phylum: Arthropoda
- Clade: Pancrustacea
- Class: Insecta
- Order: Lepidoptera
- Superfamily: Noctuoidea
- Family: Erebidae
- Subfamily: Arctiinae
- Genus: Miltochrista
- Species: M. miniata

Binomial name
- Miltochrista miniata (Forster, 1771)

Synonyms
- Phalaena miniata Forster, 1771; Bombyx rosea Fabricius, 1775; Noctua rubicunda Denis & Schiffermüller, 1775; Phalaena Tortrix roseana de Villers, 1789; Calligenia crogea Bignault, 1880; Miltochrista virginea Delahaye, 1896; Miltochrista flava Meyer, 1906; deleta Höfer, 1924; Miltochrista destrigata Dannehl, 1928; Miltochrista miniata f. nigricirris Lucas, 1959; Miltochrista miniata f. intermedia Lempke, 1961; intensa Lempke, 1961; Miltochrista miniata mosbacheri Roesler, 1967; Miltochrista confluens Lambill., 1906; Miltochrista miniata f. dentatelineata Lempke, 1964; Pyralis minialis Thunberg, 1784; Phalaena rosacea Fourcroy, 1785; Miltochrista rosaria Butler, 1877

= Miltochrista miniata =

Rosy footman

Species of moth

Miltochrista miniata, the rosy footman, is a moth of the family Erebidae. The species was first described by Johann Reinhold Forster in 1771. It is found in the temperate parts of the Palearctic realm – Europe, Asia Minor, Caucasus, northern Kazakhstan, southern Siberia, Amur, Primorye, Sakhalin, southern Kuriles, Heilongjiang, Liaoning, Hebei, Inner Mongolia, Shanxi, Sichuan, Korea and Japan, but may be replaced by Miltochrista rosaria in the eastern Palearctic.

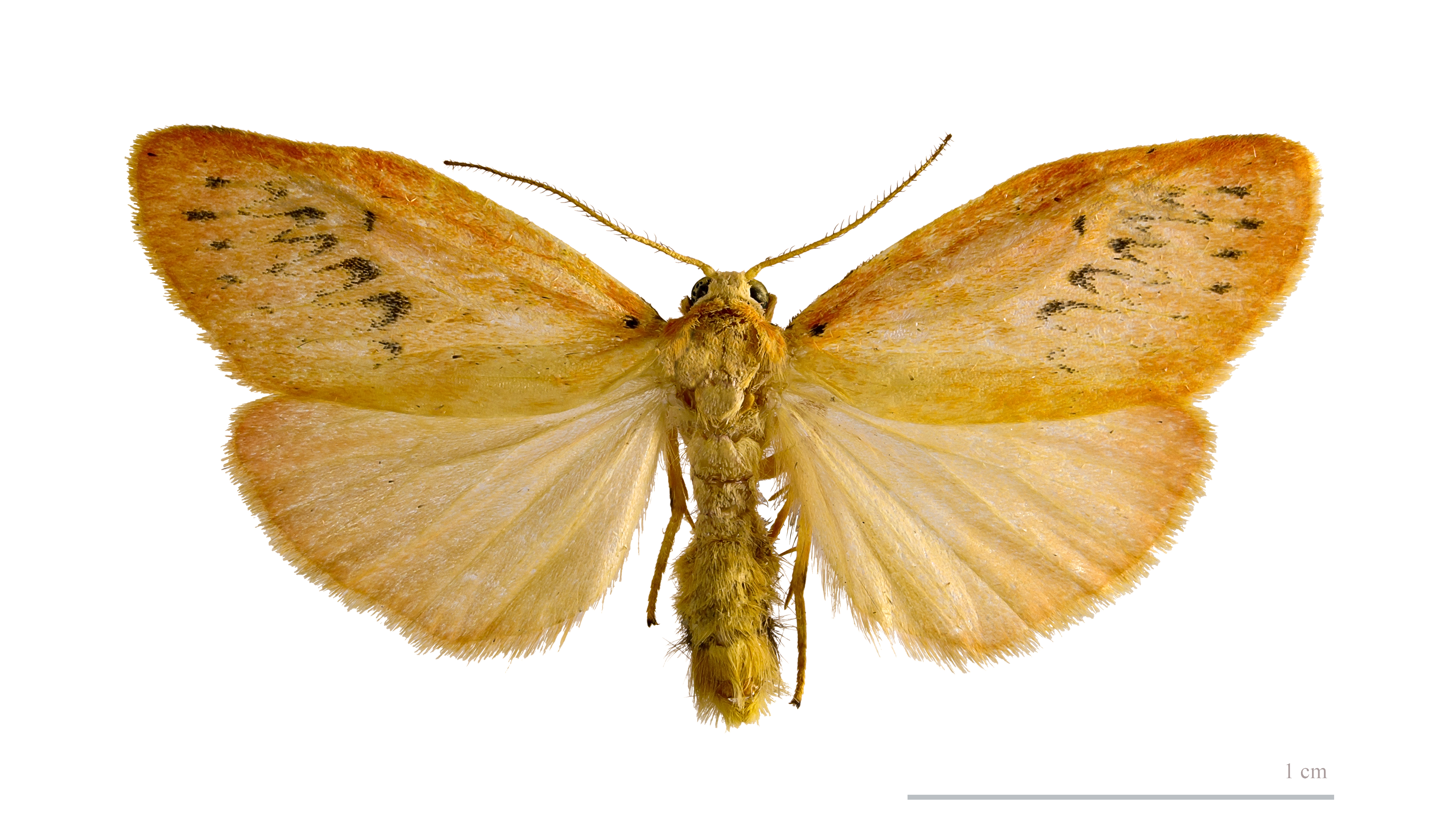
Miltochrista miniata

== Technical description and variation ==
The wingspan is 23–27 mm. Tannish-peach ground colour, rose-red margin to the forewing, and on this wing a black dentate line beyond the middle, and black, elongate spots before the margin. In the male the costa is curved upwards beyond the apex of the cell. In ab. rosaria Butler (now full species Miltochrista rosaria), which is commoner in the east of the area of distribution than in the west, and is perhaps a distinct species, the ground colour is more yellow; and in ab. crogea Bignault the wings are quite pale yellow, the forewing being edged with bright yellow.

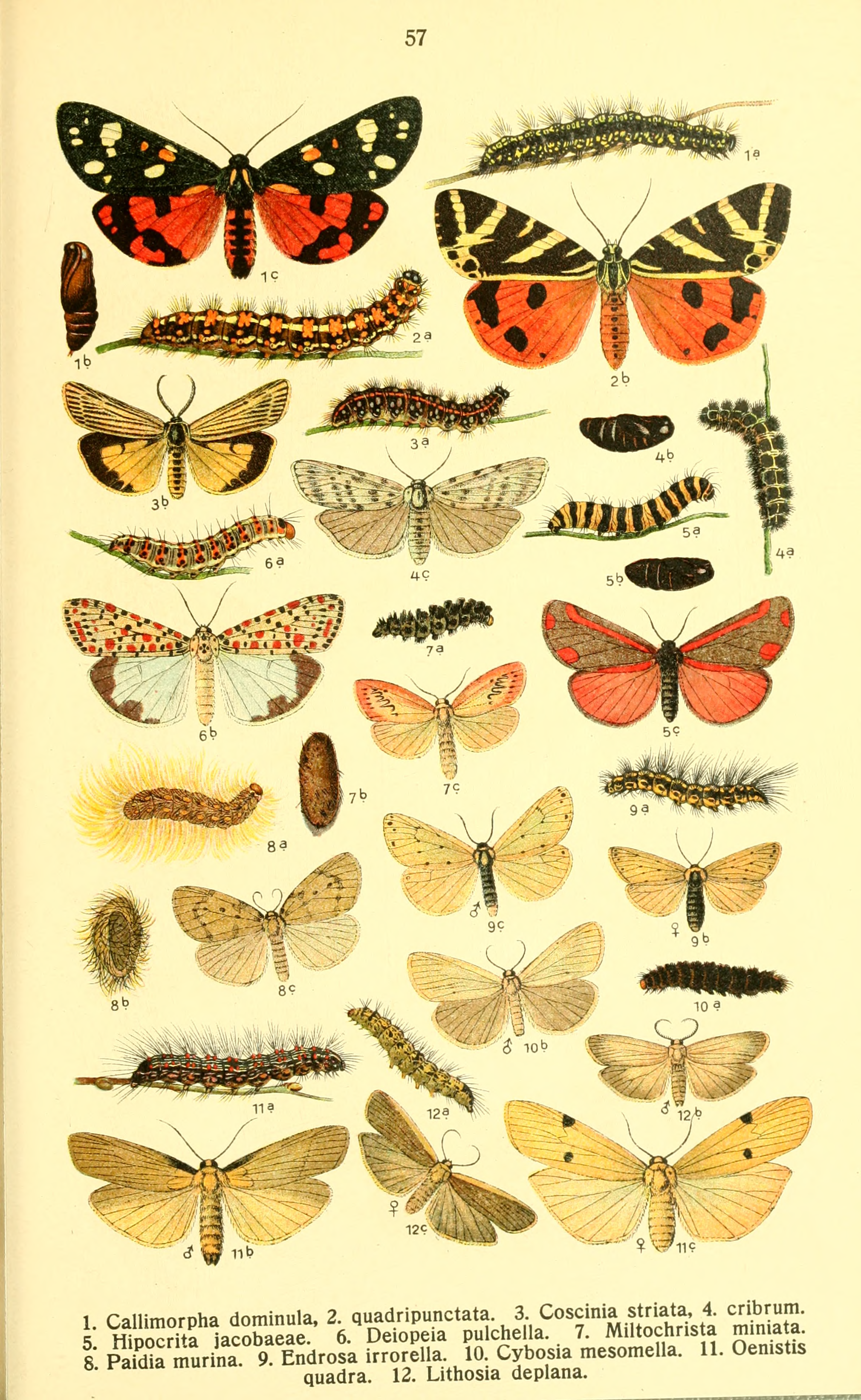
Moth, larva and cocoon in Karl Eckstein Die Schmetterlinge Deutschlands (figure 7-7c)

== Biology ==
The moth flies from June to September depending on the location. Often occurs singly, in broadleaf and mixed forests, on moors, at road-side ditches, on umbellifers or scabious.

Egg oval, yellow. Larva grey, with blackish head, with long and dense hairs, hibernating, until June on lichens on walls and fences. The caterpillars feed on lichen: phenolic compounds present in the lichens accumulate in the bodies of the caterpillars and act as a defence against predators. Pupa black-brown, abdomen with yellow incisions, in a cocoon densely intermixed with hairs.
