= Miltochrista simplicior =

Scientific classification
- Kingdom: Animalia
- Phylum: Arthropoda
- Clade: Pancrustacea
- Class: Insecta
- Order: Lepidoptera
- Superfamily: Noctuoidea
- Family: Erebidae
- Subfamily: Arctiinae
- Genus: Miltochrista
- Species: M. simplicior

Binomial name
- Miltochrista simplicior (Matsumura, 1927)

Synonyms
- Neasuroides simplicior Matsumura, 1927

Species of moth

Miltochrista simplicior is a moth of the subfamily Arctiinae. It was described by Shōnen Matsumura in 1927. It is found in Taiwan.
