= Miltochrista calamina =

Scientific classification
- Domain: Eukaryota
- Kingdom: Animalia
- Phylum: Arthropoda
- Class: Insecta
- Order: Lepidoptera
- Superfamily: Noctuoidea
- Family: Erebidae
- Subfamily: Arctiinae
- Genus: Miltochrista
- Species: M. calamina

Binomial name
- Miltochrista calamina Butler, 1877

Species of moth

Miltochrista calamina is a moth of the family Erebidae. It was described by Arthur Gardiner Butler in 1877. It is found in the Russian Far East (Middle Amur, Primorye, southern Sakhalin, Kunashir), Japan and possibly China and Korea.
