= Miltochrista pallida =

Scientific classification
- Domain: Eukaryota
- Kingdom: Animalia
- Phylum: Arthropoda
- Class: Insecta
- Order: Lepidoptera
- Superfamily: Noctuoidea
- Family: Erebidae
- Subfamily: Arctiinae
- Genus: Miltochrista
- Species: M. pallida

Binomial name
- Miltochrista pallida (Bremer, 1864)

Synonyms
- Calligenia pallida Bremer, 1864; Calligenia lutea Staudinger, 1887

Species of moth

Miltochrista pallida is a moth of the family Erebidae. It was described by Otto Vasilievich Bremer in 1864. It is found in the Russian Far East (Middle Amur, Primorye, southern Sakhalin, Kunashir), China (Jiangsu, Jiangxi, Zhejiang, Shaanxi, Shandong, Hunan, Yunan, Fujiang, Sichuan), Taiwan and Korea.
