= Miltochrista apuncta =

Scientific classification
- Domain: Eukaryota
- Kingdom: Animalia
- Phylum: Arthropoda
- Class: Insecta
- Order: Lepidoptera
- Superfamily: Noctuoidea
- Family: Erebidae
- Subfamily: Arctiinae
- Genus: Miltochrista
- Species: M. apuncta

Binomial name
- Miltochrista apuncta Rothschild, 1915

Species of moth

Miltochrista apuncta is a moth of the family Erebidae. It was described by Walter Rothschild in 1915. It is found on Seram in Indonesia.
