= Miltochrista striata =

Scientific classification
- Domain: Eukaryota
- Kingdom: Animalia
- Phylum: Arthropoda
- Class: Insecta
- Order: Lepidoptera
- Superfamily: Noctuoidea
- Family: Erebidae
- Subfamily: Arctiinae
- Genus: Miltochrista
- Species: M. striata

Binomial name
- Miltochrista striata (Bremer & Grey, 1852)

Synonyms
- Lithosia striata Bremer & Grey, 1852; Barsine pretiosa Moore, 1879; Miltochrista pretiosa Draudt, 1914; Miltochrista gratiosa kurilensis Bryk, 1942

Species of moth

Miltochrista striata is a moth of the family Erebidae. It was described by Otto Vasilievich Bremer and William Grey in 1852. It is found in the Russian Far East (Middle Amur, Primorye, southern Sakhalin, Kunashir), China (Jiangsu, Zhejiang, Jiangxi, Fujiang, Hunan, Guangxi, Shaanxi, Sichuan), Korea and Japan.
