= Miltochrista rosacea =

Scientific classification
- Domain: Eukaryota
- Kingdom: Animalia
- Phylum: Arthropoda
- Class: Insecta
- Order: Lepidoptera
- Superfamily: Noctuoidea
- Family: Erebidae
- Subfamily: Arctiinae
- Genus: Miltochrista
- Species: M. rosacea

Binomial name
- Miltochrista rosacea (Bremer, 1861)

Synonyms
- Calligenia rosacea Bremer, 1861; Miltochrista undulata Leech, 1899

Species of moth

Miltochrista rosacea is a moth of the family Erebidae. It was described by Otto Vasilievich Bremer in 1861. It is found in the Russian Far East (Middle Amur, Primorye), Korea and China (Hebei, Shanxi, Shaanxi, Hunan, Yunan, Fujiang, Zhejiang, Tibet).
