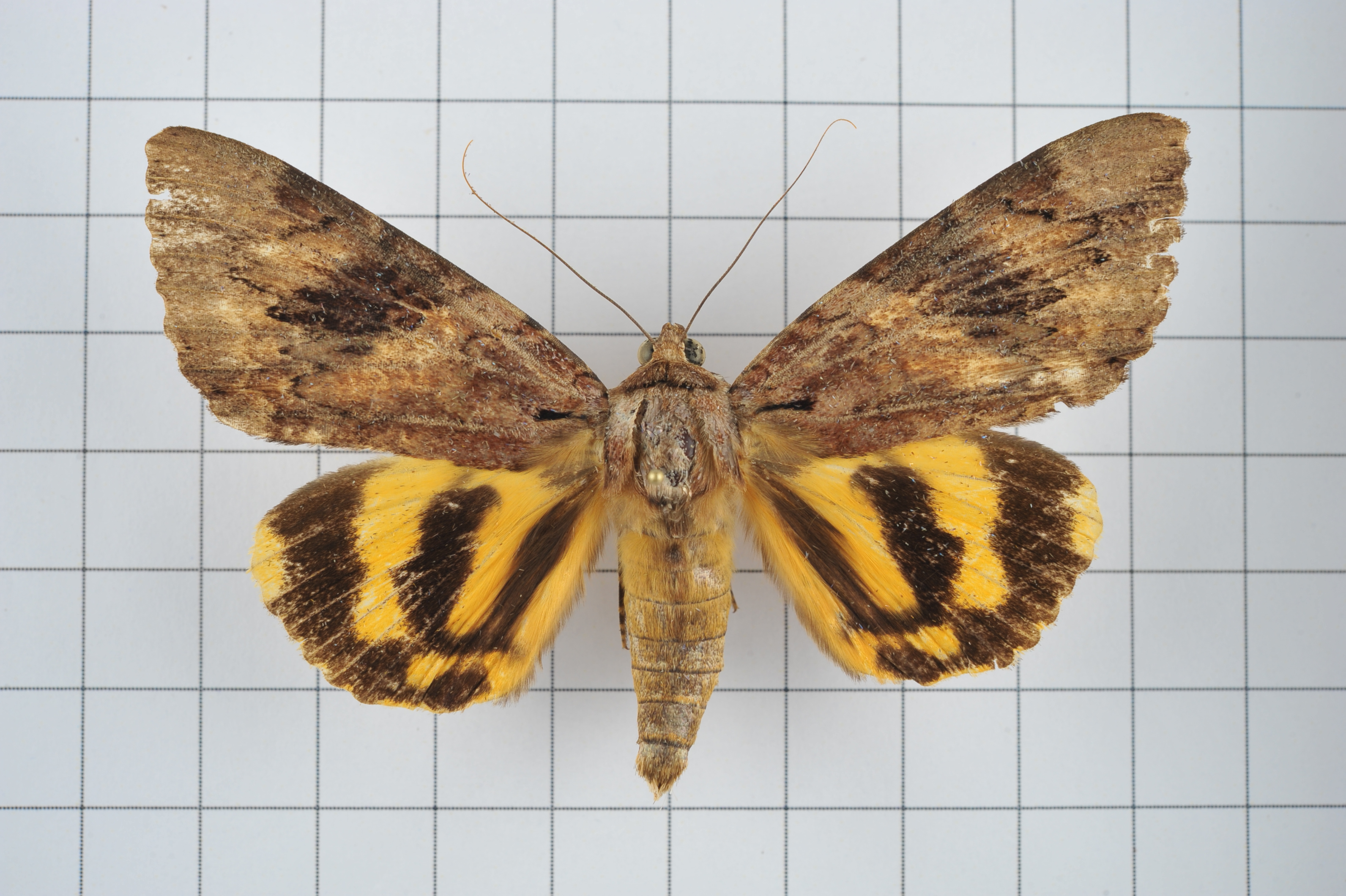

Scientific classification
- Kingdom: Animalia
- Phylum: Arthropoda
- Class: Insecta
- Order: Lepidoptera
- Superfamily: Noctuoidea
- Family: Erebidae
- Genus: Catocala
- Species: C. formosana

Binomial name
- Catocala formosana Okano, 1958

= Catocala formosana =

Species of moth

Catocala formosana is a moth in the family Erebidae first described by Okano in 1958. It is found in Taiwan.
