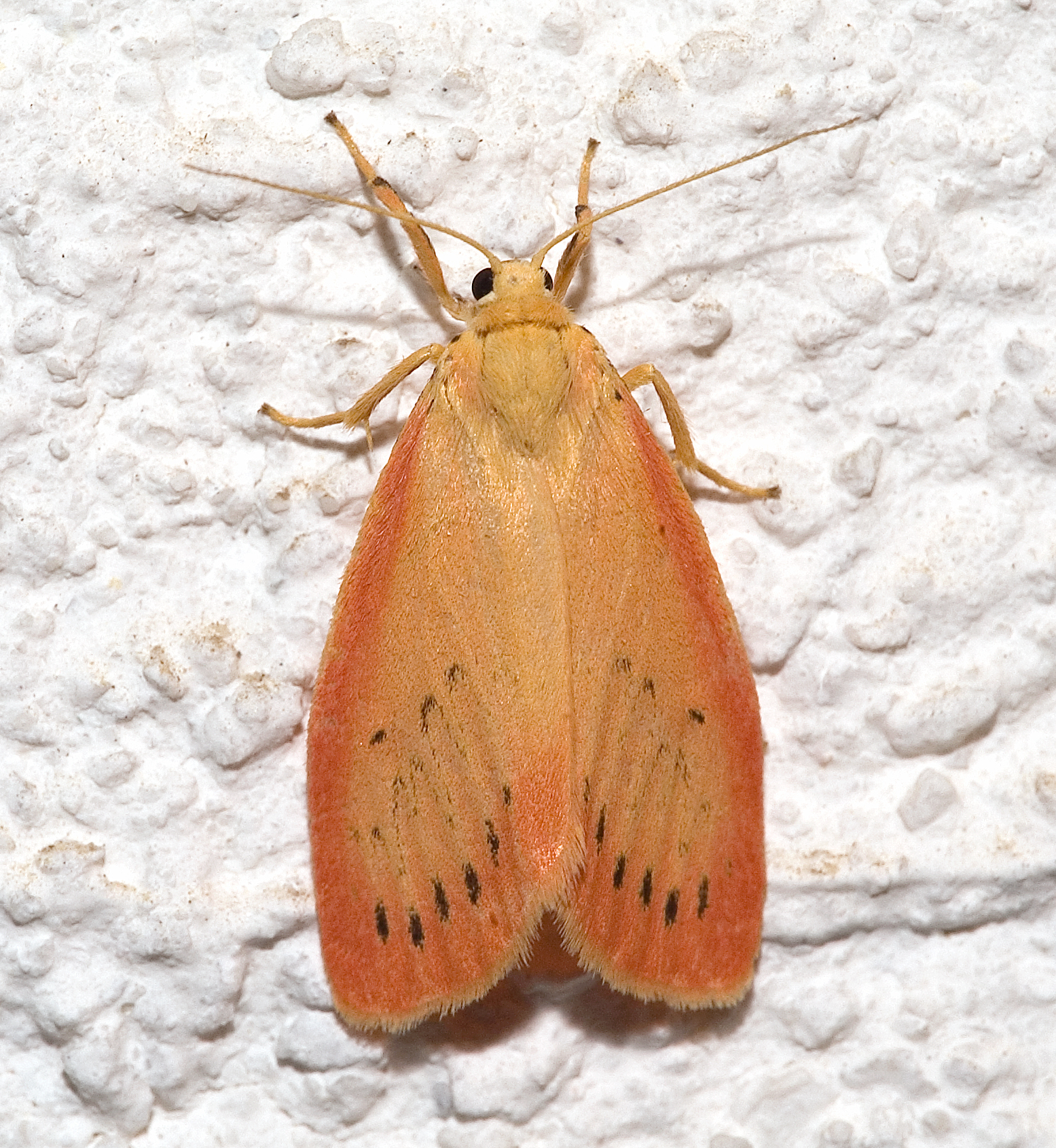

Scientific classification
- Kingdom: Animalia
- Phylum: Arthropoda
- Clade: Pancrustacea
- Class: Insecta
- Order: Lepidoptera
- Superfamily: Noctuoidea
- Family: Erebidae
- Subfamily: Arctiinae
- Tribe: Lithosiini
- Subtribe: Nudariina
- Genus: Miltochrista; Hübner, 1819

Synonyms
- Calligenia Duponchel, [1845]; Gurna Swinhoe, 1892; Neasuroides Matsumura, 1927

= Miltochrista =

Genus of moths

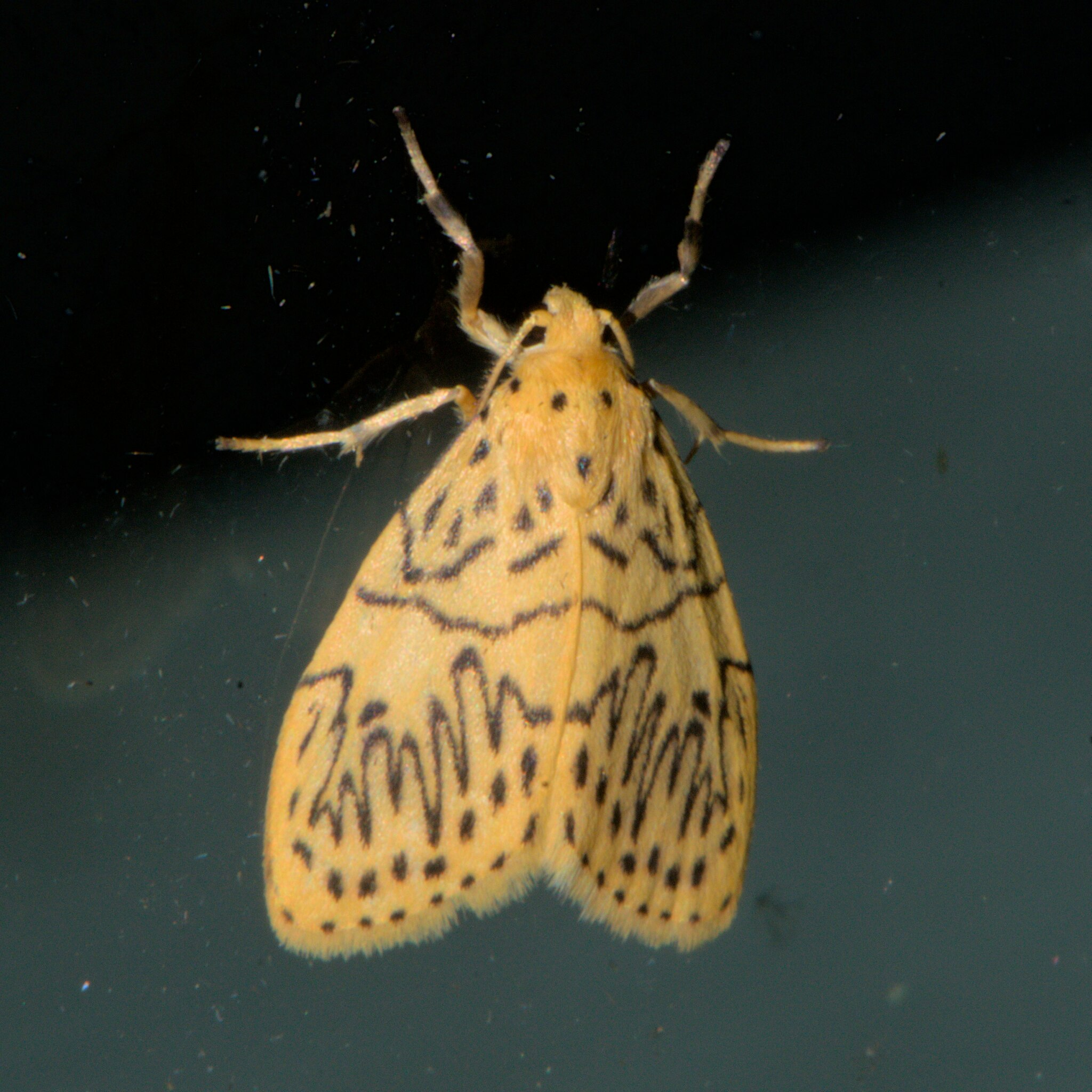
Miltochrista undulosa, India

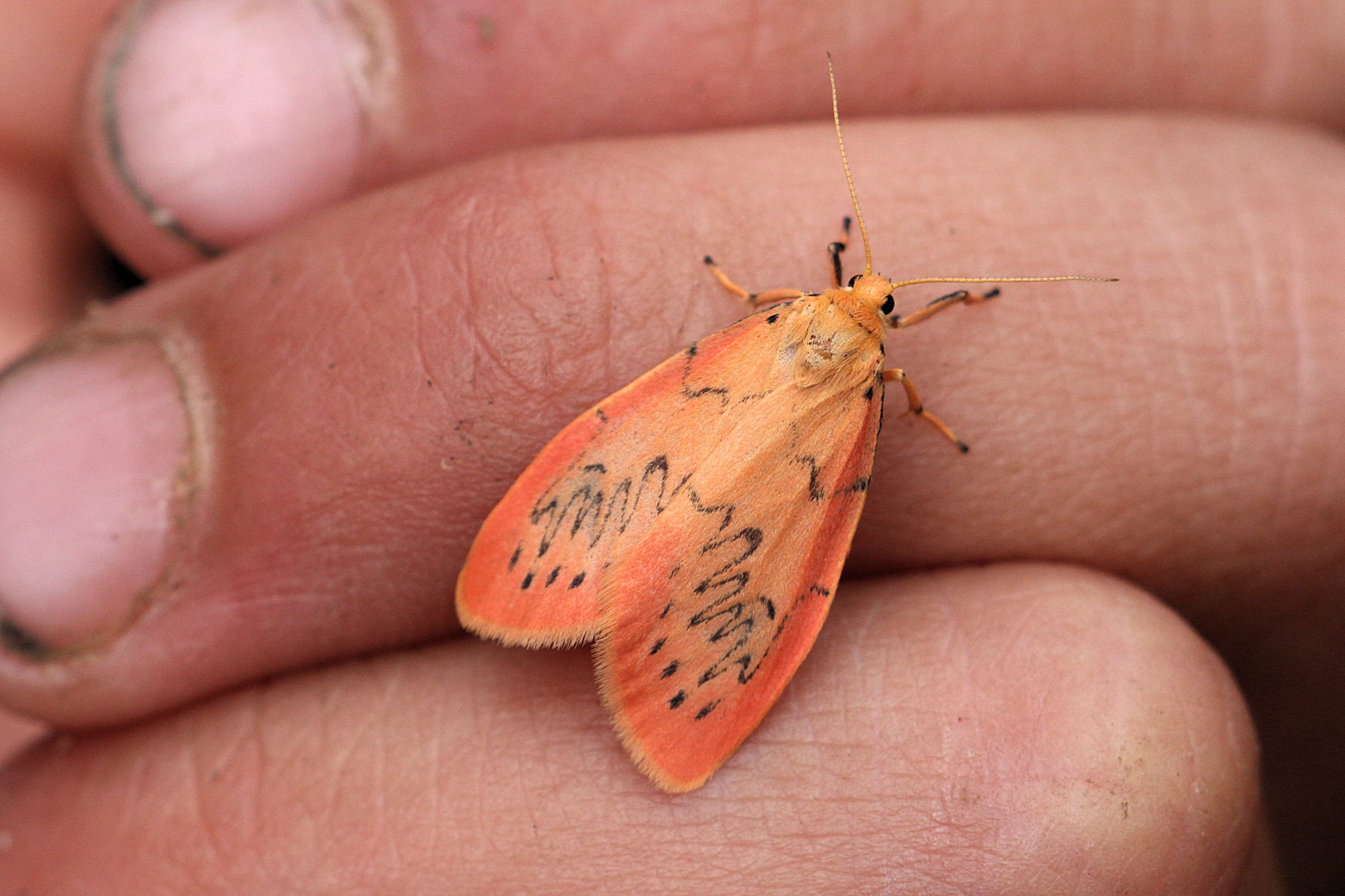
Miltochrista miniata, rosy footman, Belgium

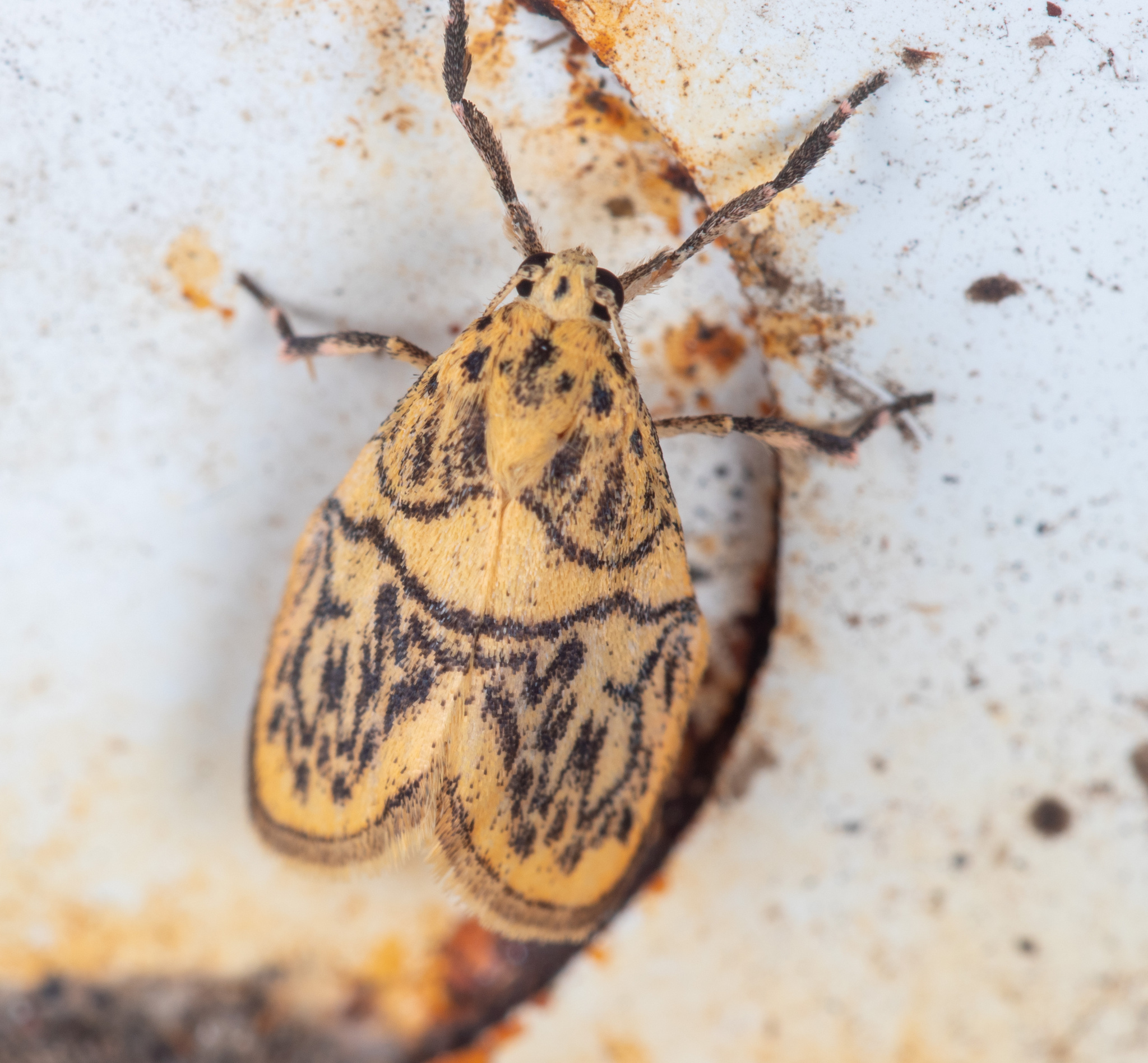
Miltochrista pseudobunda, Indonesia

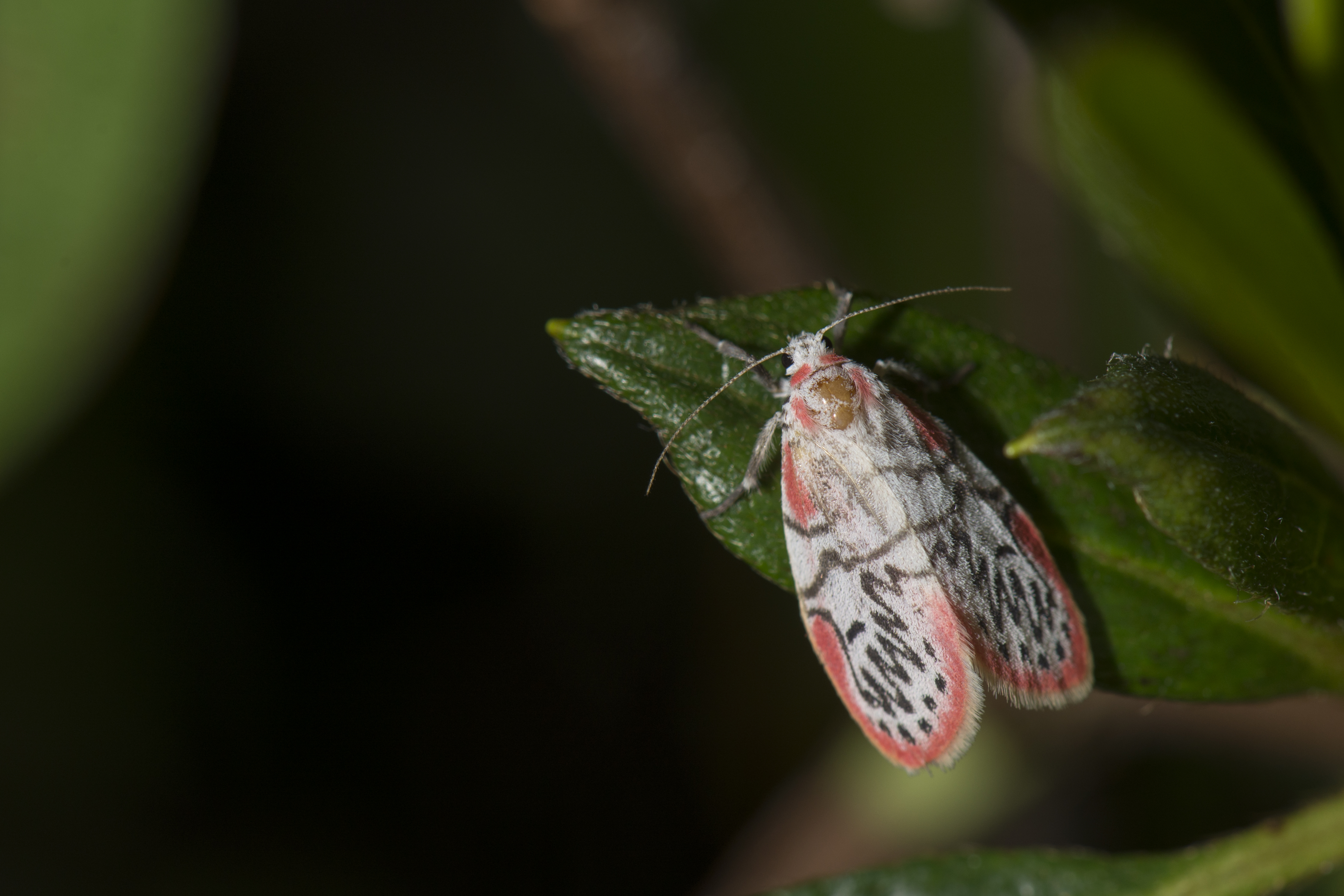
Miltochrista ziczac

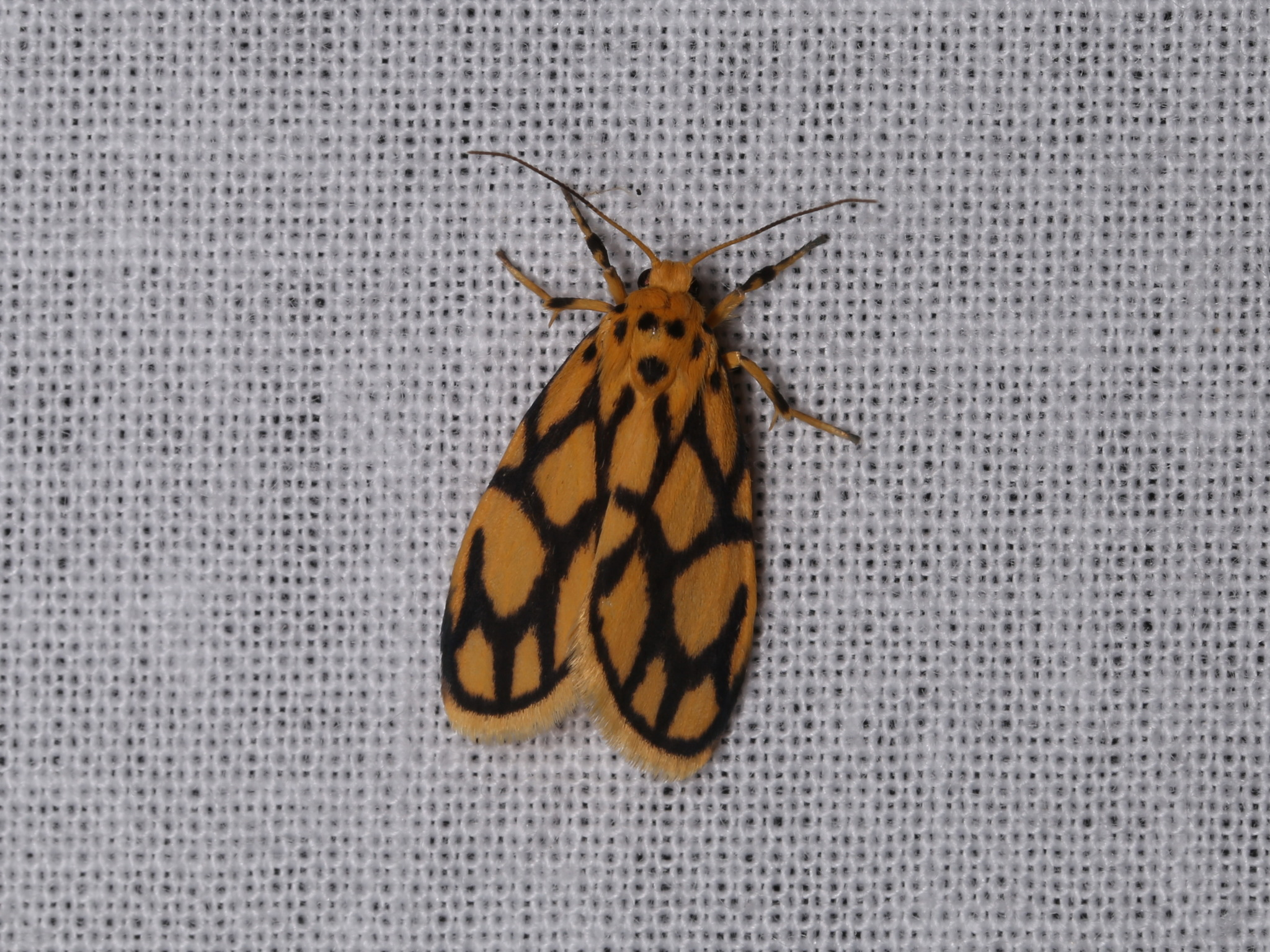
Miltochrista conjunctana, China

Miltochrista is a genus of moths of the family Erebidae, subfamily Arctiinae. The genus was erected by Jacob Hübner in 1819.

== Description ==
Palpi short and porrect (extending forward). Antennae with long cilia in male and bipectinated, and minute cilia in female. Tibia with short spurs. Forewings with vein 5 from just above lower angle of cell, vein 6 from upper angle or stalked with veins 7,8 and 9. Vein 10 from close to the angle of cell or before cell. Vein 11 from one-half to three-fourths length of cell and straight, or curved and running close along vein 12 or anastomosing with 12. Hindwings with vein 5 on a short stalk with vein 4, or from a point with it, or from above angle. Veins 6 and 7 stalked and vein 8 from near end of cell.

== Habitat ==
They commonly live in grasslands, meadows, and open woodlands it varies by species but tend to be seen more in the summer months and are found in Europe, Asia, North America and Africa. Their larva typically eat algae, mosses and lichens while the adults have been sighted feeding on nectar.

== Species ==
These 265 species belong to Miltochrista:

Miltochrista acteola (Swinhoe, 1903)
Miltochrista acteolina (Schaus, 1922)
Miltochrista acutiseriata (Holloway, 2001)
Miltochrista adelfika Volynkin, N. Singh, Černý, Kirti & Datta, 2020
Miltochrista andamana (Moore, 1877)
Miltochrista angulifera (Holloway, 2001)
Miltochrista angulinea (Holloway, 2001)
Miltochrista apicalis Walker, 1854
Miltochrista apiseriata (Holloway, 2001)
Miltochrista apuncta Rothschild, 1915
Miltochrista aquila (Černý, 2009)
Miltochrista areolifera (Holloway, 2001)
Miltochrista artocarpi (Moore, 1878)
Miltochrista asakurai Matsumura, 1927
Miltochrista ashleigera (Holloway, 2001)
Miltochrista asphida Volynkin, Černý, Huang & Saldaitis, 2023
Miltochrista atuntseica (Daniel, 1951)
Miltochrista aureata (Rothschild, 1913)
Miltochrista auritiformis (Černý, 2009)
Miltochrista aurora (Hampson, 1891)
Miltochrista bachma Volynkin & Derzhinsky, 2020
Miltochrista banlanga Volynkin & Černý, 2023
Miltochrista berdepsebunda Volynkin, Singh, Černý & Joshi, 2021
Miltochrista biseriata (Hampson, 1900)
Miltochrista brunneata (Daniel, 1965)
Miltochrista buruana (van Eecke, 1929)
Miltochrista calamaria (Moore, 1888)
Miltochrista calamina Butler, 1878
Miltochrista calcicola (Černý, 2016)
Miltochrista carnea (Poujade, 1886)
Miltochrista cataplictica Volynkin, Černý, Huang & Saldaitis, 2023
Miltochrista cepheus (Černý, 2009)
Miltochrista chromatica (Swinhoe, 1891)
Miltochrista cingula (Černý, 2009)
Miltochrista circumdata (Walker, 1864)
Miltochrista circumducta (Pagenstecher, 1900)
Miltochrista clara Daniel, 1951
Miltochrista classeigera (Holloway, 2001)
Miltochrista conjunctana (Walker, 1866)
Miltochrista conthytera Volynkin, Černý, Huang & Saldaitis, 2023
Miltochrista cornutochrista N. Singh & Kirti, 2016
Miltochrista corrigera (Volynkin & Bucsek, 2016)
Miltochrista cornutia Volynkin, Černý & Huang, 2022
Miltochrista creatina (Snellen, 1879)
Miltochrista cumseriata (Bucsek, 2012)
Miltochrista cuneifera (Walker, 1862)
Miltochrista cuneigera (Walker, 1862)
Miltochrista curvifascia (Hampson, 1891)
Miltochrista cylletona (Swinhoe, 1893)
Miltochrista dagmarae (Černý, 2016)
Miltochrista dankana Volynkin, Singh, Černý, Kirti & Datta, 2022
Miltochrista dasara (Moore, 1859)
Miltochrista delia (Schaus, 1922)
Miltochrista dentinebula (Černý, 2009)
Miltochrista detracta Walker, 1859
Miltochrista dharma (Moore, 1879)
Miltochrista diluta (Draeseke, 1926)
Miltochrista discisigna (Moore, 1878)
Miltochrista discistriga (Moore, 1878)
Miltochrista diasticta Volynkin & Černý, 2022
Miltochrista distributa (Walker, 1862)
Miltochrista dongi Huang & Volynkin, 2021
Miltochrista ecmelaena (Hampson, 1900)
Miltochrista ehyrosta Volynkin, Černý, Huang & Saldaitis, 2023
Miltochrista ekliptica Volynkin, Saldaitis & Müller, 2022
Miltochrista enormitata (Bucsek, 2014)
Miltochrista eos (Hampson, 1900)
Miltochrista etalina Volynkin, Singh, Černý, Kirti & Datta, 2022
Miltochrista eugoana Volynkin & Černý, 2021
Miltochrista evae (Černý, 2016)
Miltochrista excaviseriata (Holloway, 2001)
Miltochrista explanata Bucsek, 2020
Miltochrista falcihumilis N. Singh & Kirti, 2016
Miltochrista falciseriata (Holloway, 2001)
Miltochrista fascicornuta Volynkin, 2017
Miltochrista flavorosea Bucsek, 2020
Miltochrista flexuosa Leech, 1899
Miltochrista floccosa (Walker, 1864)
Miltochrista fluctuata Volynkin, Černý & Huang, 2022
Miltochrista fruhstorferi (Aurivillius, 1894)
Miltochrista fukiensis Daniel, 1955
Miltochrista fulvimarginata (Hampson, 1904)
Miltochrista furcata (Reich, 1936)
Miltochrista fusciramorum (Holloway, 2001)
Miltochrista gilva Daniel, 1951
Miltochrista goaensis (Kirti & Gill, 2009)
Miltochrista grandigilva Fang, 2000
Miltochrista griseata (Leech, 1899)
Miltochrista gyochiana Matsumura, 1927
Miltochrista hoenei (Daniel, 1952)
Miltochrista hogani Volynkin & Huang, 2022
Miltochrista hollowai (Kirti & Gill, 2009)
Miltochrista huashen Volynkin & Huang, 2021
Miltochrista humilis (Walker, 1854)
Miltochrista hyphenovirgula Huang, Volynkin & Černý, 2022
Miltochrista hypophaeola (Hampson, 1900)
Miltochrista idiomorfa Volynkin, Singh, Černý, Kirti & Datta, 2022
Miltochrista ila (Moore, 1859)
Miltochrista inconspicua (Moore, 1878)
Miltochrista indentata Schaus, 1922
Miltochrista infumata (Felder, 1874)
Miltochrista intensa Rothschild, 1913
Miltochrista irregularis Rothschild, 1913
Miltochrista jarawa N. Singh, Volynkin, Kirti & Datta, 2020
Miltochrista jaroslavae (Černý, 2016)
Miltochrista jucunda Fang, 1991
Miltochrista kerala Volynkin & Huang, 2022
Miltochrista khammouanea Bucsek, 2020
Miltochrista konta Volynkin, Černý & N. Singh, 2020
Miltochrista kontumica (Dubatolov & Bucsek, 2013)
Miltochrista kosterini (Dubatolov & Bucsek, 2013)
Miltochrista kravchenkoi Volynkin, Saldaitis & Müller, 2022
Miltochrista kumarkaustubhi Singh, Kirti, Joshi & Singh, 2023
Miltochrista labyrintha (Bucsek, 2012)
Miltochrista lampra Volynkin, Černý, Huang & Saldaitis, 2023
Miltochrista lateritia (Černý, 2009)
Miltochrista latimargo (Roepke, 1946)
Miltochrista lavides Volynkin, Černý & N. Singh, 2020
Miltochrista lignea (Černý, 1995)
Miltochrista likiangensis (Daniel, 1952)
Miltochrista lineidistincta (Bucsek, 2012)
Miltochrista lutara (Moore, 1859)
Miltochrista lutarella Kalis, 1934
Miltochrista lutescens Rothschild, 1936
Miltochrista luzonica (Wileman & South, 1919)
Miltochrista lyclenoides Černý, 2016
Miltochrista madathumala Singh, Kirti, Joshi & Singh, 2023
Miltochrista malayproducta (Bucsek, 2012)
Miltochrista marginata (Walker, 1865)
Miltochrista margita (van Eecke, 1926)
Miltochrista mediobliqua Wu, Fu & Chang, 2013
Miltochrista megala (Hampson, 1900)
Miltochrista megalytera Volynkin, Černý & Huang, 2022
Miltochrista melanapyga (Hampson, 1918)
Miltochrista mentiens (Fang, 1993)
Miltochrista mesilaulinea (Holloway, 2001)
Miltochrista miniata (Forster, 1771) - (rosy footman)
Miltochrista minibunda (Černý, 2009)
Miltochrista miraculosa Volynkin & Huang, 2022
Miltochrista modesta (Leech, 1899)
Miltochrista modvena (Schaus, 1924)
Miltochrista monoklina Volynkin & Huang, 2022
Miltochrista multiramorum (Holloway, 2001)
Miltochrista nataliae (Černý, 2016)
Miltochrista neocuneifera N. Singh & Kirti, 2016
Miltochrista neoseriata N. Singh & Kirti, 2016
Miltochrista ni (Heylaerts, 1891)
Miltochrista nigrilineata (Fang, 2000)
Miltochrista nigrivena Leech, 1899
Miltochrista nigroanalis (Matsumura, 1927)
Miltochrista nigrococcinea Bayarsaikhan, Volynkin & Bae, 2019
Miltochrista nubilalis (Hampson, 1894)
Miltochrista nuiba Volynkin, Černý, Huang & Saldaitis, 2023
Miltochrista nujiangia Volynkin, Černý & Huang, 2022
Miltochrista obliqua (Hampson, 1891)
Miltochrista obliquilinea (Swinhoe, 1901)
Miltochrista obscurilinea (Holloway, 2001)
Miltochrista obscuripostica Dubatolov, Kishida & Wang, 2012
Miltochrista obsoleta (Moore, 1878)
Miltochrista obsoletaria (Bucsek, 2014)
Miltochrista obtusilinea (Holloway, 2001)
Miltochrista ochracea (Hampson, 1891)
Miltochrista osthelderi (Daniel, 1951)
Miltochrista pachia Volynkin, Saldaitis & Müller, 2022
Miltochrista pallida (Bremer, 1884)
Miltochrista paraarcuata N. Singh, Kirti & Joshi, 2016
Miltochrista parallelina Hampson, 1894
Miltochrista parallelinaformis Bucsek, 2020
Miltochrista paraseriata N. Singh, Kirti & Joshi, 2016
Miltochrista parvulus Bucsek, 2020
Miltochrista pectena (Bucsek, 2012)
Miltochrista pellucida (de Joannis, 1928)
Miltochrista peloa (Swinhoe, 1904)
Miltochrista perihaemia (Hampson, 1900)
Miltochrista phaeoplagia (Hampson, 1900)
Miltochrista phantasma (Hampson, 1907)
Miltochrista phupana Volynkin & Černý, 2023
Miltochrista pingera (Bucsek, 2012)
Miltochrista platyrhabda (Tams, 1935)
Miltochrista poring (Holloway, 2001)
Miltochrista postbicolor (Rothschild, 1913)
Miltochrista postnigra Hampson, 1894
Miltochrista postseriata (Holloway, 2001)
Miltochrista poststrigata Schaus, 1922
Miltochrista primaria Volynkin, Černý, Huang & Saldaitis, 2023
Miltochrista producta (Černý, 2009)
Miltochrista pseudoarcuata N. Singh & Kirti, 2016
Miltochrista pseudobunda (Holloway, 2001)
Miltochrista pseudodistributa (Bucsek, 2014)
Miltochrista pseudomodesta Joshi, Singh & Volynkin, 2017
Miltochrista pseudoobsoleta N. Singh, 2019
Miltochrista pseudoseriata N. Singh & Kirti, 2016
Miltochrista pudibunda (Snellen, 1880)
Miltochrista puncakica (Dubatolov & Bucsek, 2014)
Miltochrista punctata (Rothschild, 1913)
Miltochrista punctilineata (Wileman & South, 1919)
Miltochrista qingchenga Volynkin, Černý, Huang & Saldaitis, 2023
Miltochrista quadra Joshi, Singh & Volynkin, 2017
Miltochrista quadrata (Holloway, 2001)
Miltochrista radaricola (Černý, 2009)
Miltochrista ranonga Volynkin & Černý, 2023
Miltochrista reflexusa (Fang, 2000)
Miltochrista rhabdota (Rothschild, 1920)
Miltochrista rigidistria Candèze, 1927
Miltochrista rolleri Bucsek, 2020
Miltochrista rosacea (Bremer, 1861)
Miltochrista rosalia (Hampson, 1914)
Miltochrista roseogrisea (Rothschild, 1913)
Miltochrista rubricans (Leech, 1890)
Miltochrista rufescens (Rothschild, 1912)
Miltochrista ruptifascia (Hampson, 1893)
Miltochrista semifascia (Walker, 1854)
Miltochrista setozia Volynkin, Černý & Huang, 2022
Miltochrista sexpuncta Hampson, 1894
Miltochrista simonka (Bucsek, 2014)
Miltochrista simplicior (Matsumura, 1927)
Miltochrista solita (Walker, 1854)
Miltochrista soloma Volynkin, Černý, Huang & Saldaitis, 2023
Miltochrista stenovalva Volynkin, N. Singh, Černý, Kirti & Datta, 2020
Miltochrista striata (Wileman, 1910)
Miltochrista strigatula (Rothschild, 1913)
Miltochrista strigibasis (de Joannis, 1930)
Miltochrista strigipennis (Herrich-Schäffer, 1855)
Miltochrista swanni Volynkin, Černý, Huang & Saldaitis, 2023
Miltochrista szetschwanica (Daniel, 1952)
Miltochrista taprobana (Hampson, 1907)
Miltochrista taragmena Volynkin & Huang, 2022
Miltochrista tenella Fang, 1991
Miltochrista tenera Bucsek, 2020
Miltochrista tenuiprocessa Volynkin, Černý, Huang & Saldaitis, 2023
Miltochrista terminata (Moore, 1878)
Miltochrista terminospota (N. Singh, Kirti & Joshi, 2015)
Miltochrista terrarega Singh, Raha & Joshi, 2024
Miltochrista testata (Černý, 2016)
Miltochrista tibeta Daniel, 1951
Miltochrista tinsukia Volynkin, Saldaitis & Müller, 2022
Miltochrista tronga (Schaus, 1922)
Miltochrista tsimphida Volynkin, Černý, Huang & Saldaitis, 2023
Miltochrista tsinglingensis Daniel, 1951
Miltochrista tumida Volynkin, Černý, Huang & Saldaitis, 2023
Miltochrista tuta Fang, 1991
Miltochrista uncalis (Kirti & Gill, 2009)
Miltochrista undulata (Swinhoe, 1903)
Miltochrista undulosa (Walker, 1854)
Miltochrista undunoides N. Singh & Kirti, 2016
Miltochrista unguifera (Holloway, 2001)
Miltochrista unica Bucsek, 2020
Miltochrista uniformeola (Hampson, 1900)
Miltochrista unipuncta (Leech, 1890)
Miltochrista valdenigra (Bucsek, 2012)
Miltochrista velona Volynkin, Saldaitis & Müller, 2022
Miltochrista venustusa (Bucsek, 2012)
Miltochrista vetusta Snellen, 1904
Miltochrista vidlickai Bucsek, 2020
Miltochrista violacea (Reich, 1936)
Miltochrista wangmini Volynkin, Dubatolov & Kishida, 2018
Miltochrista weidenhofferi (Černý, 2012)
Miltochrista wenchiyehi Wu, Fu & Chang, 2013
Miltochrista x-linea (Bucsek, 2012)
Miltochrista xanthopera (Hampson, 1907)
Miltochrista xihe Volynkin & Huang, 2021
Miltochrista yimingcheni Wu, Fu & Chang, 2013
Miltochrista ziczac (Walker, 1856)
Miltochrista zinchenkoi (Dubatolov & Bucsek, 2013)
Miltochrista zorae (Černý, 2016)
