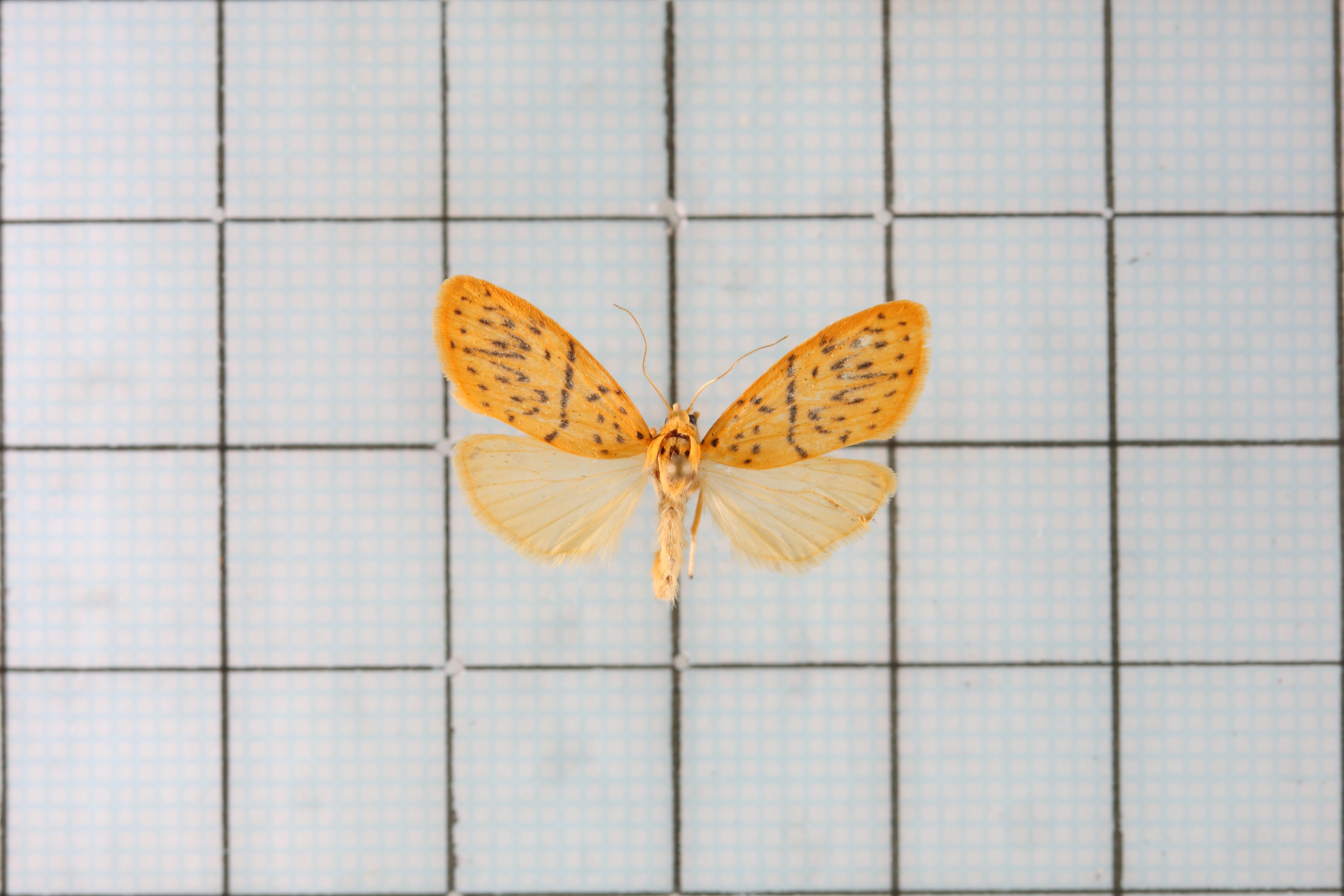

Scientific classification
- Domain: Eukaryota
- Kingdom: Animalia
- Phylum: Arthropoda
- Class: Insecta
- Order: Lepidoptera
- Superfamily: Noctuoidea
- Family: Erebidae
- Subfamily: Arctiinae
- Genus: Asura
- Species: A. alikangiae

Binomial name
- Asura alikangiae (Strand, 1917)

Synonyms
- Asura obsoleta f. alikangiae Strand, 1917; Lyclene alikangiae (Strand, 1917)

= Asura alikangiae =

Species of moth

Asura alikangiae is a moth in the family Erebidae first described by Embrik Strand in 1917. It is found in Taiwan.

The wingspan is 20–28 mm. Adults are on wing from March to June.
