= Stidzaeras evora =

Scientific classification
- Domain: Eukaryota
- Kingdom: Animalia
- Phylum: Arthropoda
- Class: Insecta
- Order: Lepidoptera
- Superfamily: Noctuoidea
- Family: Erebidae
- Subfamily: Arctiinae
- Genus: Stidzaeras
- Species: S. evora

Binomial name
- Stidzaeras evora (H. Druce, 1906)

Synonyms
- Pitane evora H. Druce, 1906

Species of moth

Stidzaeras evora is a moth in the family Erebidae. It was described by Herbert Druce in 1906. It is found in Peru.
