= Stidzaeras =

Scientific classification
- Domain: Eukaryota
- Kingdom: Animalia
- Phylum: Arthropoda
- Class: Insecta
- Order: Lepidoptera
- Superfamily: Noctuoidea
- Family: Erebidae
- Subfamily: Arctiinae
- Subtribe: Phaegopterina
- Genus: Stidzaeras; Druce, 1905

Genus of moths

Stidzaeras is a genus of moths in the family Erebidae.

== Species ==
- Stidzaeras evora Druce, 1906
- Stidzaeras strigifera Druce, 1905
