= Stidzaeras strigifera =

Scientific classification
- Domain: Eukaryota
- Kingdom: Animalia
- Phylum: Arthropoda
- Class: Insecta
- Order: Lepidoptera
- Superfamily: Noctuoidea
- Family: Erebidae
- Subfamily: Arctiinae
- Genus: Stidzaeras
- Species: S. strigifera

Binomial name
- Stidzaeras strigifera H. Druce, 1905

Species of moth

Stidzaeras strigifera is a moth in the family Erebidae. It was described by Herbert Druce in 1905. It is found in Venezuela and Peru.

== Subspecies ==
- Stidzaeras strigifera strigifera (Venezuela)
- Stidzaeras strigifera ockendeni Rothschild, 1910 (Peru)
