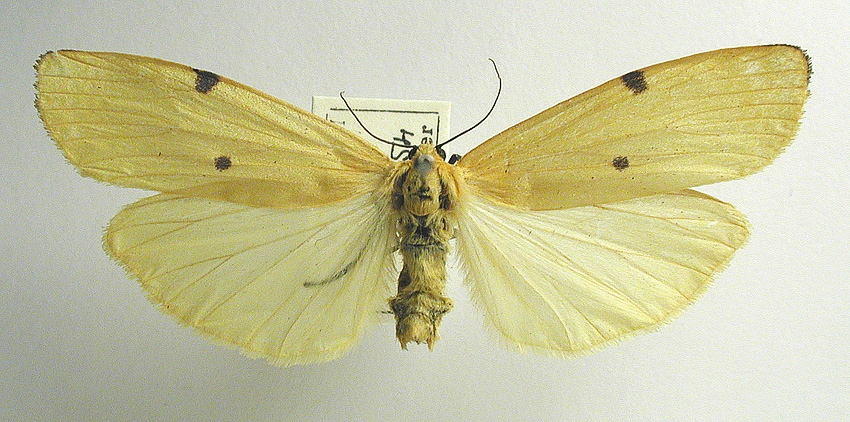
- Lithosia quadra

Scientific classification
- Domain: Eukaryota
- Kingdom: Animalia
- Phylum: Arthropoda
- Class: Insecta
- Order: Lepidoptera
- Superfamily: Noctuoidea
- Family: Erebidae
- Subfamily: Arctiinae
- Tribe: Lithosiini
- Subtribe: Lithosiina
- Genus: Lithosia; Fabricius, 1798

Synonyms
- Lithosis Billberg, 1820; Lichenia Sodoffsky, 1837

= Lithosia =

Genus of moths

Lithosia is a genus of moths in the family Erebidae. The genus was first described by Johan Christian Fabricius in 1798. Species are cosmopolitan.

== Description ==
Palpi short and porrect (extending forward). Antennae ciliated. Forewing with shorter and broader cell. Vein 2 from beyond the middle. Vein 3 and 4 stalked, vein 5 absent, vein 6 from below angle or from angle or beyond it. Vein 9 rising from vein 10 and forming an areole or stalked with veins 7 and 8. Vein 11 free or anastomosing (fused) with vein 12. Hindwing with vein 3, 4 and 6, 7 stalked. Vein 5 absent and vein 8 from middle of cell.

== Species ==
- Lithosia quadra Linnaeus, 1758
- Lithosia taishanica Daniel, 1954
- Lithosia yuennanensis (Daniel, 1952)

== Placement unclear ==
- Lithosia amoyca Daniel, 1954
- Lithosia atuntseica Daniel, 1954
- Lithosia clarivenata Reich, 1937
- Lithosia eburneola Turati, 1933
- Lithosia gynaegrapha de Joannis, 1930
- Lithosia insolata Dannatt, 1929
- Lithosia likiangica Daniel, 1954
- Lithosia lungtanica Daniel, 1954
- Lithosia szetchuana Sterneck, 1938
- Lithosia tienmushanica Daniel, 1954

== Former species ==
- Lithosia atroradiata Walker, 1864
- Lithosia chekiangica Daniel, 1954
- Lithosia chrysargyrea Kiriakoff, 1963
- Lithosia colonoides Kiriakoff, 1963
- Lithosia formosicola Matsumura, 1927
- Lithosia fukienica Daniel, 1954
- Lithosia horishanella Matsumura, 1927
- Lithosia hunanica Daniel, 1954
- Lithosia innshanica Daniel, 1939
- Lithosia karenkona Matsumura, 1930
- Lithosia magnata Matsumura, 1927
- Lithosia minima Daniel, 1954
- Lithosia pavescens Daniel, 1954
- Lithosia ranrunensis Matsumura, 1927
- Lithosia postmaculosa Matsumura, 1927
- Lithosia pseudocomplana Daniel, 1939
- Lithosia ratonella Matsumura, 1927
- Lithosia rhyparodactyla Kiriakoff, 1963
- Lithosia saitonis Matsumura, 1927
- Lithosia sakia Matsumura, 1927
- Lithosia subcosteola Druce, 1899
- Lithosia taiwanella Matsumura, 1927
- Lithosia tomponis Matsumura, 1927
- Lithosia uniformeola Daniel, 1954
- Lithosia usuguronis Matsumura, 1927
