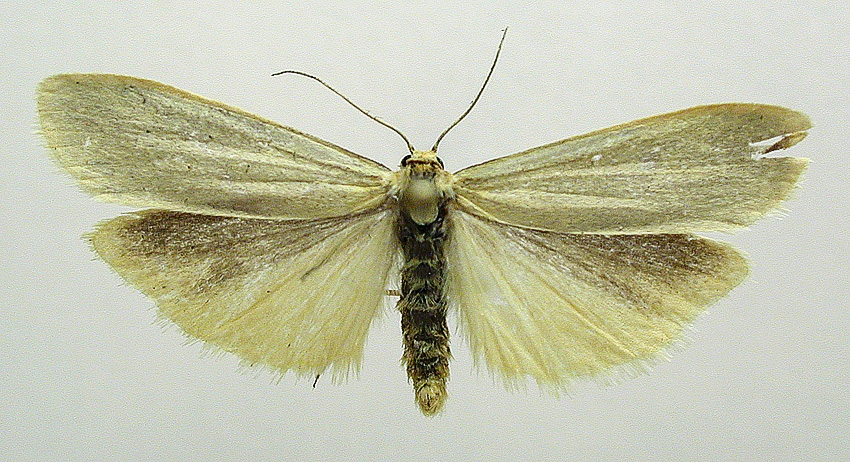

Scientific classification
- Kingdom: Animalia
- Phylum: Arthropoda
- Class: Insecta
- Order: Lepidoptera
- Superfamily: Noctuoidea
- Family: Erebidae
- Subfamily: Arctiinae
- Subtribe: Lithosiina
- Genus: Manulea; Wallengren, 1863

Synonyms
- Agenjoa Dubatolov & Zolotuhin, 2011 (= Nyea Agenjo, 1983, syn. nov.); Colinia Agenjo, 1977 (preocc. Nuttall 1832)

= Manulea =

Genus of moths

Manulea is a genus of moths in the family Erebidae erected by Hans Daniel Johan Wallengren in 1863. The type species is Lithosia gilveola Ochsenheimer, 1810 (= palliatella Scopoli, 1763), designated by subsequent designation by Moore in 1878.

Like other members of the subtribe Lithosiina, larvae of species in Manulea feed primarily on lichens. The larvae of Manulea complana, for example, feed on various species of lichen (Parmelia spp.) as well as dry and tender leaves of various plants including Quercus, Fagus, Prunus, Salix, and Rubus.

== Species ==
Subgenus Manulea Wallengren, 1863
complana species group

- Manulea complana (Linnaeus, 1758)
- Manulea costalis (Zeller, 1847) (=morosina Herrich-Schäffer, [1847])
- Manulea palliatella (Scopoli, 1763) (=unita [Denis & Schiffermüller], 1775)
- Manulea pseudocomplana (Daniel, 1939)

lutarella species group

- Manulea lutarella (Linnaeus, 1758)
- Manulea flavociliata (Lederer, 1853)

minor species group

- Manulea minor (Okano, 1955)
- Manulea pseudofumidisca Dubatolov & Zolotuhin, 2011

pygmaeola species group

- Manulea affineola (Bremer, 1864)
- Manulea fuscodorsalis (Matsumura, 1930)
- Manulea japonica (Leech, [1889])
- Manulea kansuensis (Hering, 1936)
- Manulea minima (Daniel, 1954)
- Manulea nankingica (Daniel, 1954)
- Manulea omelkoi Dubatolov & Zolotuhin, 2011
- Manulea predotae (Schawerda, 1927)
- Manulea pygmaeola (Doubleday, 1847)
- Manulea ussurica (Daniel, 1954)
- Manulea uniformeola (Daniel, 1954)
- Manulea wiltshirei (Tams, 1939)

Subgenus Agenjoa Dubatolov & Zolotuhin, 2011

- Manulea hunanica (Daniel, 1954)
- Manulea lurideola (Zincken, 1817)

A subgenus Churingosia Volynkin & Černý was described in 2022, with the type species Ilema nigripes Hampson, 1900. It included species from the Oriental realm, among them Manulea (Churingosia) chrysophleps (Hampson, 1895) and Manulea (Churingosia) nigripes (Hampson, 1900).

Four new species were described at the same time: Manulea (Churingosia) fardyftera from Northeast India, M. (C.) reducta from northern Myanmar and Northeast India, M. (C.) mikrotera from northern Myanmar and Northeast India, and M. (C.) mavropoda from northern Indochina.

=== Incorrectly placed ===
- Manulea replana (Lewin, 1805) (now Brunia replana)
