= Brunia =

Brunia may refer to:

- Brunia (moth), a genus of insects in the family Erebidae
- Brunia (plant), a genus of plants in the family Bruniaceae
