= Collita coreana =

Scientific classification
- Domain: Eukaryota
- Kingdom: Animalia
- Phylum: Arthropoda
- Class: Insecta
- Order: Lepidoptera
- Superfamily: Noctuoidea
- Family: Erebidae
- Subfamily: Arctiinae
- Genus: Collita
- Species: C. coreana

Binomial name
- Collita coreana (Leech, 1888)

Synonyms
- Lithosia coreana Leech, 1888

Species of moth

Collita coreana is a moth of the family Erebidae. It is found in Korea. Records for the Russian Far East and Japan are probably based on misidentifications of Manulea ussurica.

The wingspan is 25–27 mm.
