= Abaxisotima =

Scientific classification
- Domain: Eukaryota
- Kingdom: Animalia
- Phylum: Arthropoda
- Class: Insecta
- Order: Orthoptera
- Suborder: Ensifera
- Family: Tettigoniidae
- Subfamily: Phaneropterinae
- Tribe: Ducetiini
- Genus: Abaxisotima; Gorochov, 2005

Genus of insects

Abaxisotima is a genus of bush crickets found in China.

== Species ==
GBIF includes:

1. Abaxisotima acuminata (Wang, Yuwen & Xian-wei Liu, 1996)
2. Abaxisotima bicolor (Liu, Xian-wei, Z.Zheng & G.Xi, 1991)
3. Abaxisotima brevifissa (Wang, Yuwen & Xian-wei Liu, 1996)
4. Abaxisotima forcipiforma Wang, Gang & F.-M.Shi, 2012
5. Abaxisotima furca (Gorochov & L.Kang, 2002) - type species (as Shirakisotima furca Gorochov & L. Kang)
6. Abaxisotima macrocaudata Wang, Gang & F.-M.Shi, 2012
7. Abaxisotima multipunctata (L.Kang & Chikun Yang, 1989)
8. Abaxisotima spiniforma Wang, Gang & F.-M.Shi, 2009
