= Scopula shiskensis =

Scientific classification
- Kingdom: Animalia
- Phylum: Arthropoda
- Clade: Pancrustacea
- Class: Insecta
- Order: Lepidoptera
- Family: Geometridae
- Genus: Scopula
- Species: S. shiskensis

Binomial name
- Scopula shiskensis (Matsumura, 1925)

Synonyms
- Acidalia shiskensis Matsumura, 1925

Species of geometer moth in subfamily Sterrhinae

Scopula shiskensis is a moth of the family Geometridae. It is found on Sakhalin.
