= Manulea fuscodorsalis =

Scientific classification
- Kingdom: Animalia
- Phylum: Arthropoda
- Clade: Pancrustacea
- Class: Insecta
- Order: Lepidoptera
- Superfamily: Noctuoidea
- Family: Erebidae
- Subfamily: Arctiinae
- Genus: Manulea
- Species: M. fuscodorsalis

Binomial name
- Manulea fuscodorsalis (Matsumura, 1930)

Synonyms
- Lithosia fuscodorsalis Matsumura, 1930; Lithosia yokohamae Daniel, 1954; Eilema fuscodorsalis

Species of moth

Manulea fuscodorsalis is a moth of the family Erebidae. It is found in Taiwan and Japan.

The wingspan is about 30 mm.
