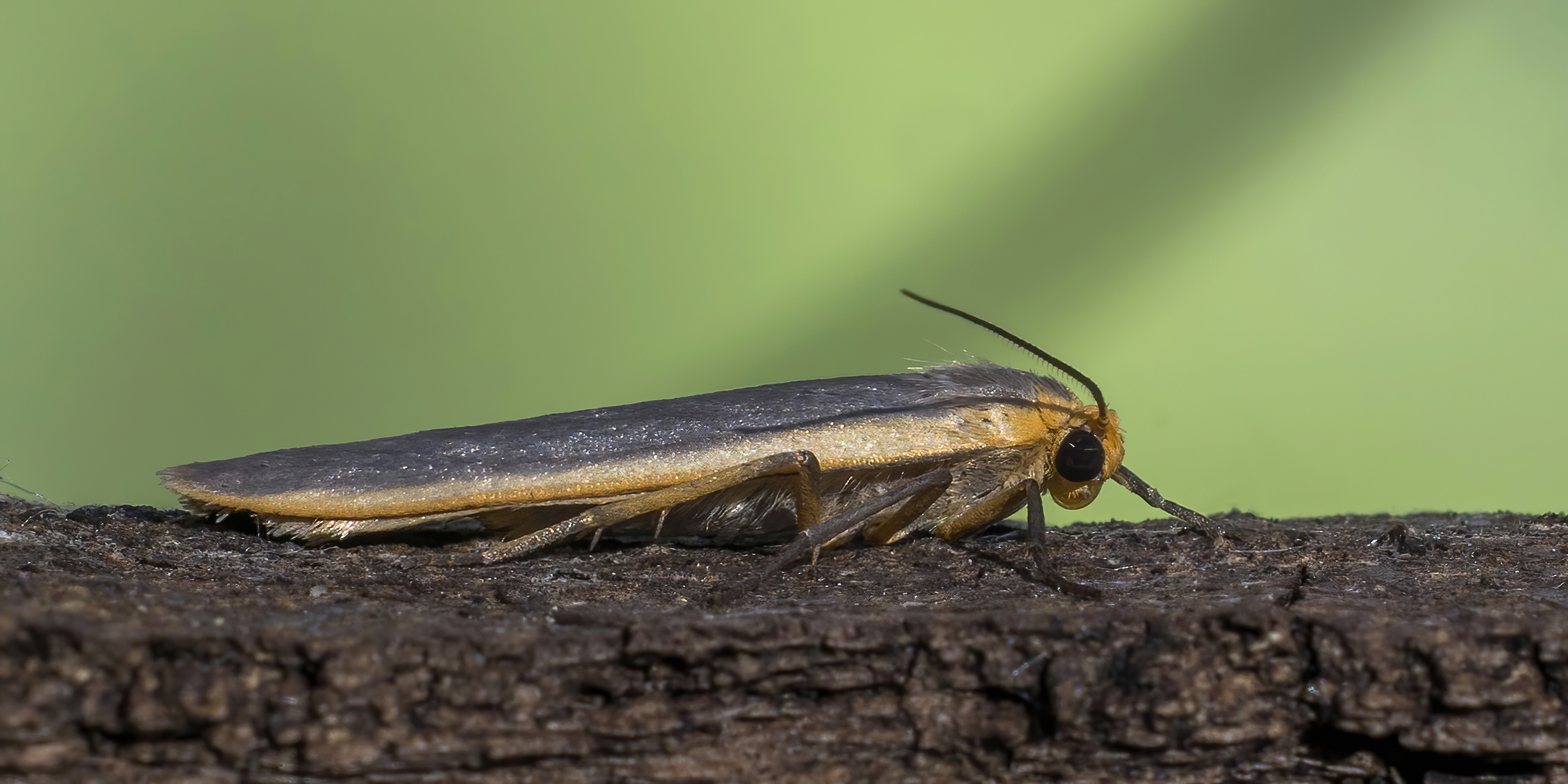

Scientific classification
- Domain: Eukaryota
- Kingdom: Animalia
- Phylum: Arthropoda
- Class: Insecta
- Order: Lepidoptera
- Superfamily: Noctuoidea
- Family: Erebidae
- Subfamily: Arctiinae
- Genus: Manulea
- Species: M. lurideola

Binomial name
- Manulea lurideola (Zincken, 1817)

Synonyms
- Lithosia lurideola Zincken, 1817; Lithosia complanula Boisduval, 1834; Bombyx plumbeola Hübner, 1848; Eilema lurideola; Eilema lurideolum

= Common footman =

Species of moth

The common footman (Manulea lurideola) is a moth of the family Erebidae. The species was first described by Johann Leopold Theodor Friedrich Zincken in 1817. It is distributed throughout Europe and east through the Palearctic to Lake Baikal.

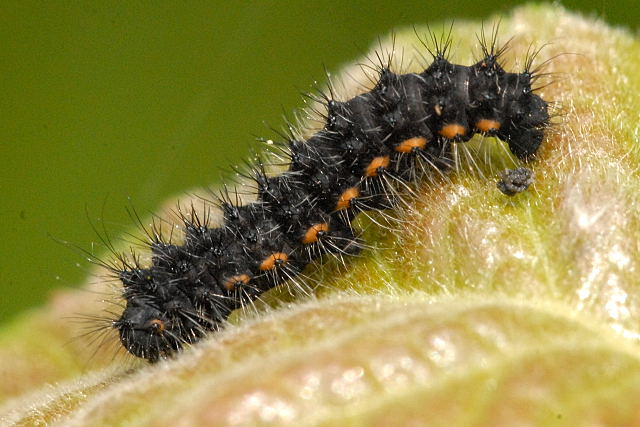
Caterpillar

This species has a wingspan of 31–38 mm. The forewings are grey with a yellowish-buff streak along the costa. The hindwings are a uniform cream colour. Like other footmen, it rests with its wings wrapped around its body. (The common name footman comes from a supposed resemblance to the uniform of a footman.)

== Technical description and variation ==
Wingspan 31–38 mm. Forewing broadened towards the outer margin, bright glossy lead grey with broad, regular, light yellow costal band, somewhat dulled at the apex, and pure yellow fringes; hindwing, head and neck and anal tuft of male ivory yellow. Beneath, the forewing is only suffused with sooty grey at the base and on the disc, so that a broad outer border is pale yellow. Hindwing pale yellow with a slightly dark costal margin.

== Biology ==
This moth flies at night in July and August and is attracted to light and nectar-rich flowers.

Larva dark lilac grey with black dorsal line and black head, bearing black and yellow hairs; subdorsal lines black, stigma-line orange. It usually feeds on various lichens including Parmelia, although it has also been recorded feeding on buckthorn and oak. The species overwinters as a larva, hibernating, until the end of May. Pupa reddish brown and glossy. According to Schmidt the larvae prefer the trunks of beeches and oaks, but (Seitz) "I often beat the moths out of the lower branches of high, solitary larches in the Alpine valleys; locally very common, especially in the mountains".

1. The flight season refers to the British Isles. This may vary in other parts of the range.
