= Eilema tomponis =

Scientific classification
- Kingdom: Animalia
- Phylum: Arthropoda
- Clade: Pancrustacea
- Class: Insecta
- Order: Lepidoptera
- Superfamily: Noctuoidea
- Family: Erebidae
- Subfamily: Arctiinae
- Genus: Eilema
- Species: E. tomponis

Binomial name
- Eilema tomponis (Matsumura, 1927)

Synonyms
- Lithosia tomponis Matsumura, 1927

Species of moth

Eilema tomponis is a moth of the subfamily Arctiinae. It is found in Taiwan.
