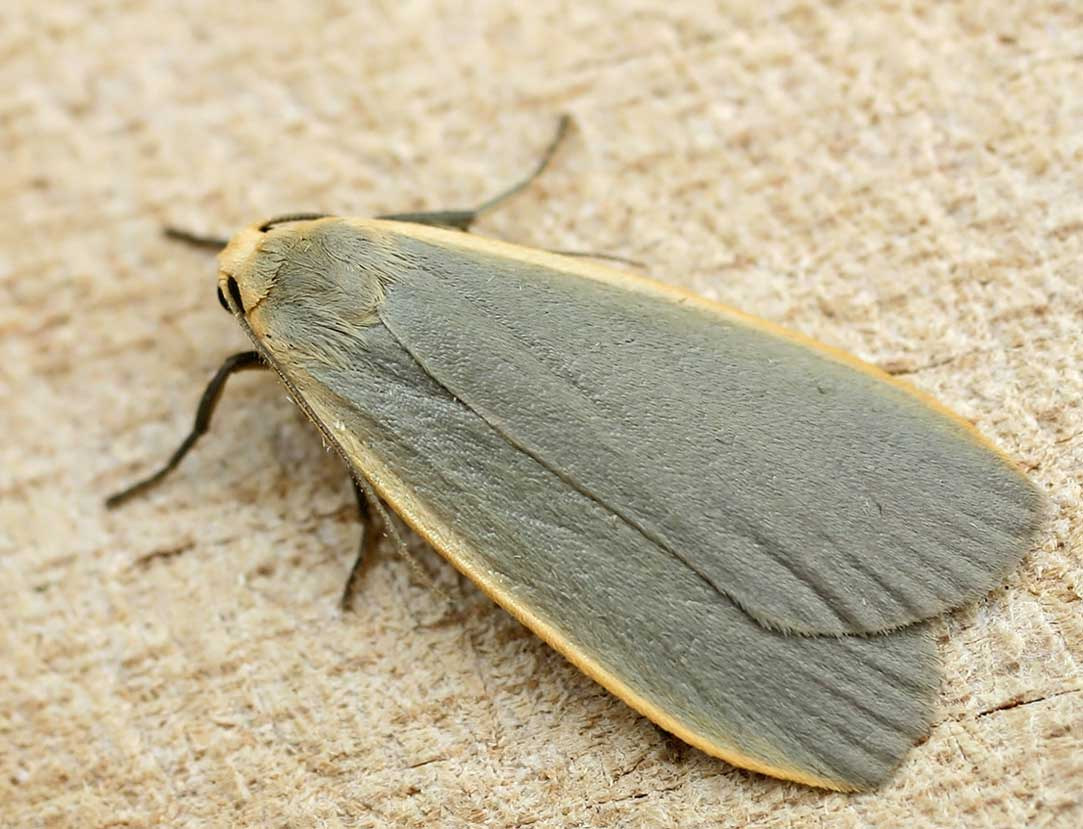

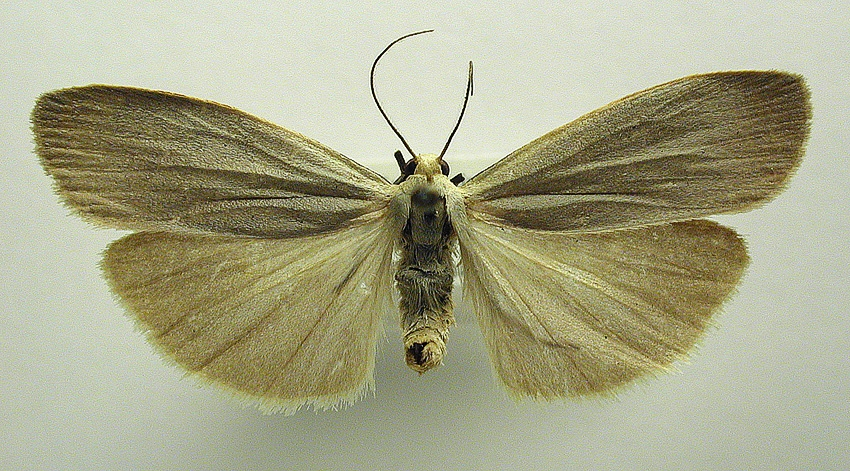

Scientific classification
- Kingdom: Animalia
- Phylum: Arthropoda
- Class: Insecta
- Order: Lepidoptera
- Superfamily: Noctuoidea
- Family: Erebidae
- Subfamily: Arctiinae
- Genus: Collita
- Species: C. griseola

Binomial name
- Collita griseola (Hübner, 1803)

Synonyms
- Bombyx griseola Hübner, [1803]; Eilema griseolum; Eilema griseola; Lithosia flava Haworth, 1809; Lithosia plumbeolata Stephens, 1829; Lithosia stramineola Doubleday, 1847; Collita lilacina Moore, 1878; Lithosia cinerea Poujade, 1886; Lithosia lenta Leech, 1890; Lithosia fuscicilia Hampson, 1894; Eilema submontana Inoue, 1982; Lithosia griseola f. pallida Lempke, 1961; Lithosia griseola f. aurantiaca Lempke, 1961; Lithosia sachalinensis Matsumura, 1930

= Collita griseola =

Dingy footman

Species of moth

Collita griseola, the dingy footman, is a moth of the family Erebidae. The species was first described by Jacob Hübner in 1803. It is found in Europe and North and South-East Asia.

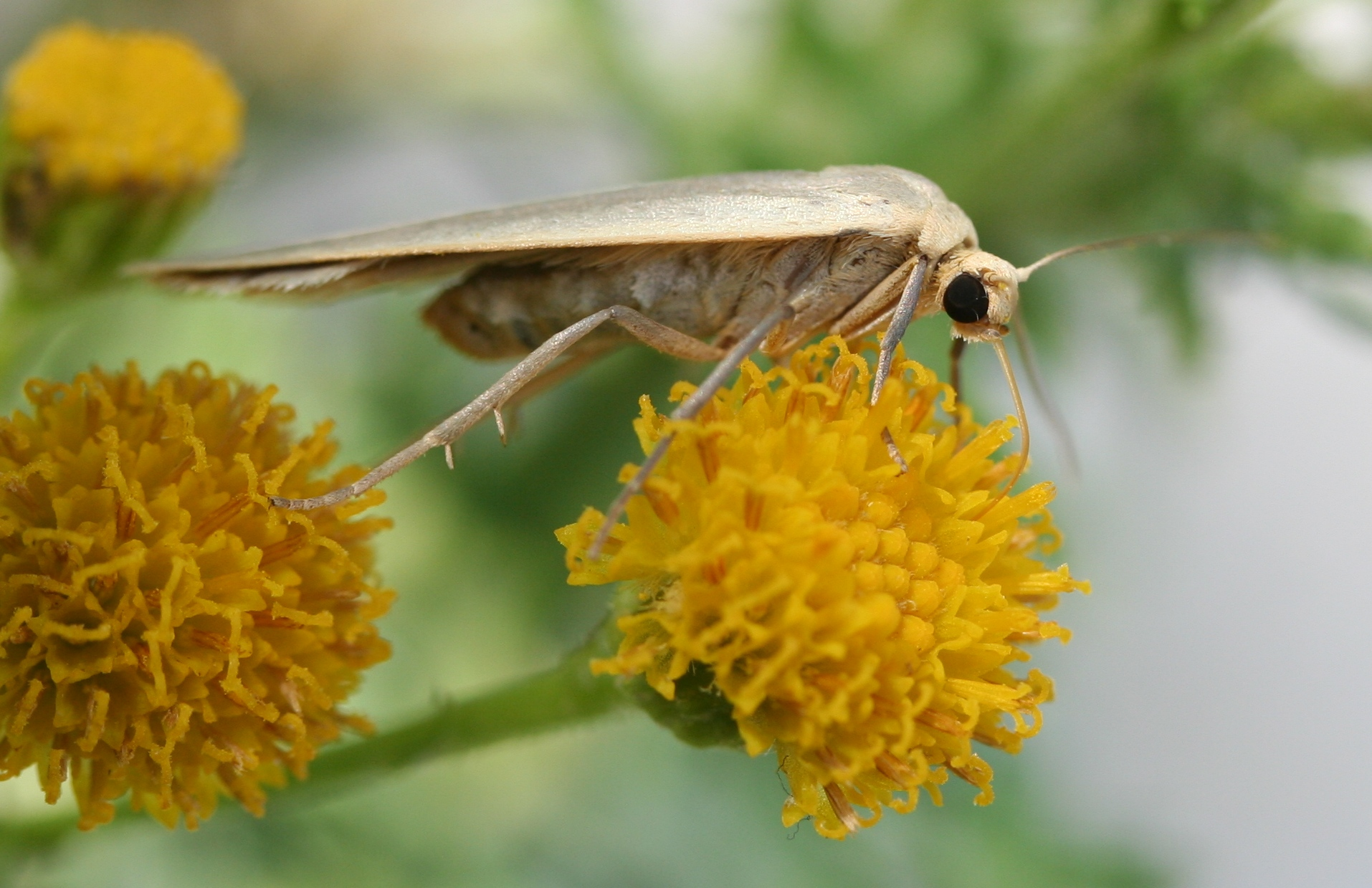

The wingspan is 32–40 mm. The moth flies from May to August depending on the location.

The larvae feed on lichen.

This species has shown a spectacular increase in abundance in Britain during the period 1968 to 2007, like a number of moth species with larva that feed on lichens and algae. In Britain it was originally limited to southern fens and marshy areas, but has since spread northwards and now occupy a variety of habitats, including gardens.

== Subspecies ==
- Collita griseola griseola
- Collita griseola sachalinensis (Matsumura, 1930) (Russian Far East)
- Collita griseola submontana (Inoue, 1982) (Japan)
