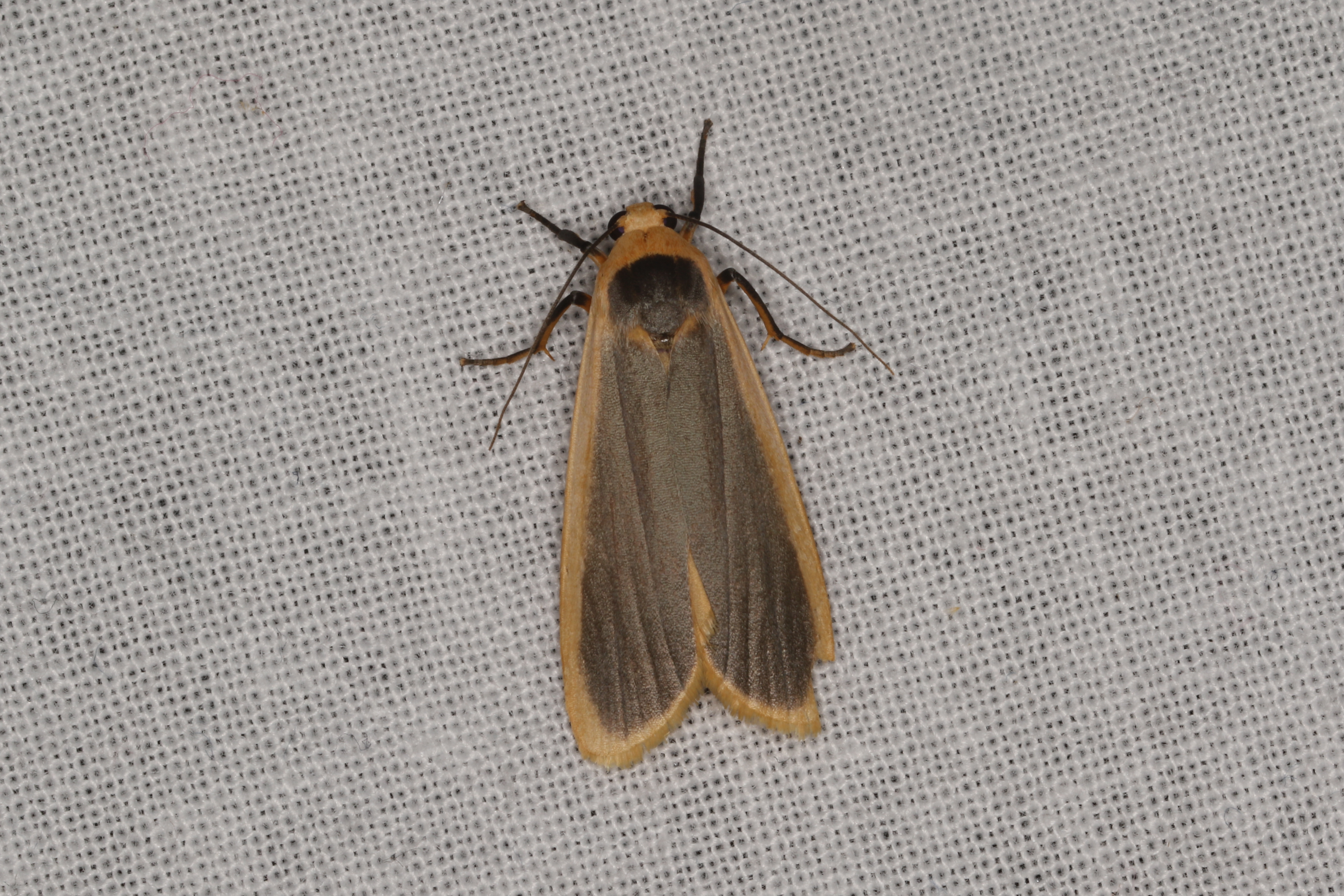
- Brunia dorsalis

Scientific classification
- Kingdom: Animalia
- Phylum: Arthropoda
- Class: Insecta
- Order: Lepidoptera
- Superfamily: Noctuoidea
- Family: Erebidae
- Subfamily: Arctiinae
- Subtribe: Lithosiina
- Genus: Brunia; Moore, 1878

= Brunia (moth) =

Genus of moths

Brunia is a genus of tiger moths in the family Erebidae. The genus was erected by Frederic Moore in 1878.

== Species ==
- Brunia antica (Walker 1854)
- Brunia apicalis (Walker, 1862)
- Brunia badrana (Moore, 1859)
- Brunia cucullata (Moore, 1878)
- Brunia dorsalis Walker, 1866
- Brunia ekeikei Bethune-Baker, 1904
- Brunia fumidisca (Hampson, 1894)
- Brunia gibonica (Černý, 2009)
- Brunia lacrima (Černý, 2009)
- Brunia nebulifera (Hampson, 1900)
- Brunia replana (Lewin, 1805)
- Brunia sarawaka (Butler, 1877)
- Brunia testacea (Rothschild, 1912)

== Notes ==
- Dubatolov, V. V.; Zolotuhin, V. V. (2011). "Does Eilema Hübner, [1819] (Lepidoptera, Arctiidae, Lithosiinae) present one or several genera?" (PDF). Euroasian Entomological Journal. 10 (3): 367–379, 380, VII.
- Holloway, J. D. (2001). "The Moths of Borneo: subfamily Arctiinae, subfamily Lithosiinae". Malayan Nature Journal. 55: 279–458.
