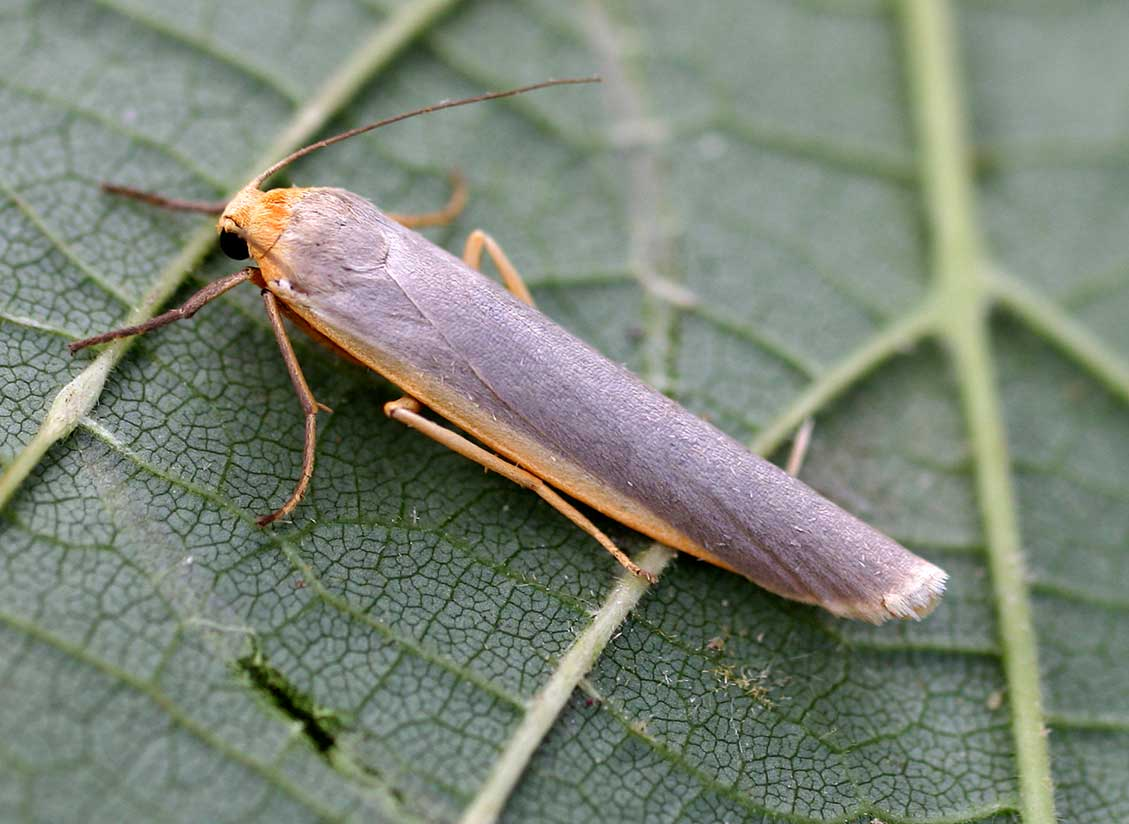

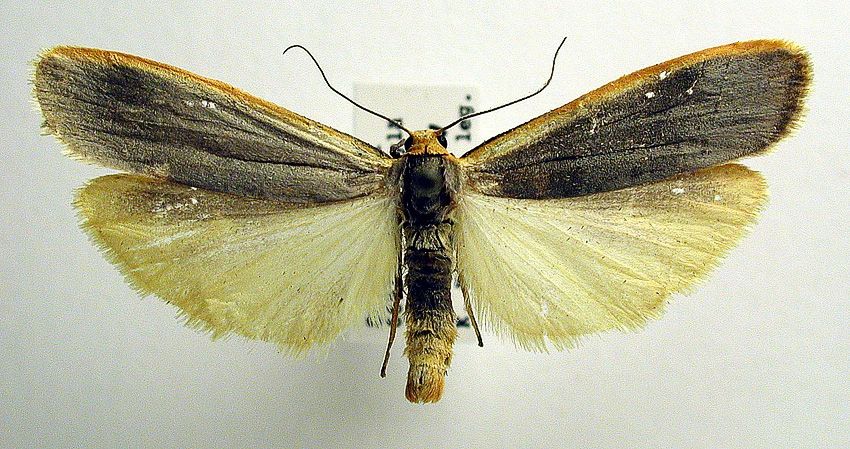

Scientific classification
- Kingdom: Animalia
- Phylum: Arthropoda
- Class: Insecta
- Order: Lepidoptera
- Superfamily: Noctuoidea
- Family: Erebidae
- Subfamily: Arctiinae
- Genus: Manulea
- Species: M. complana

Binomial name
- Manulea complana (Linnaeus, 1758)

Synonyms
- Phalaena complana Linnaeus, 1758; ochrocephala Geoffroy, 1785; Lithosia complanata Costa, 1833; Lithosia sericea Gregson, 1860; Lithosia molybdeola Guenée, 1861; Crambidia allegheniensis Holland, 1903; Lithosia complana balcanica Daniel, 1939; Lithosia complana f. postgrisescens Lempke, 1961; Lithosia complana f. pallida van Wisselingh, 1961; Lithosia complana f. flava Lempke, 1964; Eilema angustiala Bryk, [1949] 1948

= Manulea complana =

Scarce footman

Species of moth

Manulea complana, the scarce footman, is a moth of the family Erebidae. The species was first described by Carl Linnaeus in his 1758 10th edition of Systema Naturae. It is found throughout the Palearctic region.

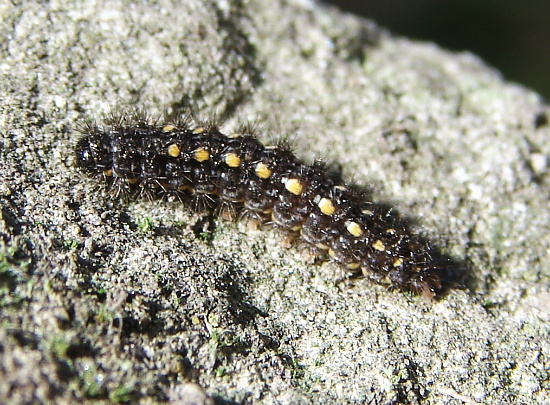
Larva

== Technical description and variation ==
The wingspan is 28–35 mm. It is very like Eilema morosinum (Herrich-Schäffer, [1847]) but the forewing not so elongate, and the angles not so accentuated, the costal streak broader and brighter yellow, the hindwing duller, not so transparent; the apex of the abdomen brighter yellow. On the underside the disc is very blackish iron grey, and contrasts vividly with the orange-yellow costa and the broad pale yellow marginal area. Hindwing beneath pale yellow, the costa deeper yellow; below costa a grey streak from the base.

== Biology ==
The moth flies from June to August depending on the location.

Larva blackish dorsally, with narrow lighter lines; subdorsal lines composed of small reddish yellow and white spots; lateral line interrupted, reddish yellow. The larvae feed on lichens such as Parmelia, and also dry and tender leaves.
