= Collita =

Scientific classification
- Domain: Eukaryota
- Kingdom: Animalia
- Phylum: Arthropoda
- Class: Insecta
- Order: Lepidoptera
- Superfamily: Noctuoidea
- Family: Erebidae
- Subfamily: Arctiinae
- Subtribe: Lithosiina
- Genus: Collita; Moore, 1878

Genus of moths

Collita is a genus of moths in the family Erebidae. The genus was erected by Frederic Moore in 1878.

Most species were previously placed in the genus Eilema.

== Species ==
- Collita chinensis (Daniel, 1954) (eastern Asia)
- Collita coreana (Leech, 1888) (eastern Asia)
- Collita digna (Ignatyev & Witt, 2007) (eastern Asia)
- Collita gina (Okano, [1955]) (eastern Asia: Japan)
- Collita griseola (Hübner, 1803) (northern Eurasia)
- Collita okanoi (Inoue, 1961) (eastern Asia: Japan and neighboring islands)
- Collita vetusta (Walker, 1854) (eastern Asia)
