= Collita chinensis =

Scientific classification
- Domain: Eukaryota
- Kingdom: Animalia
- Phylum: Arthropoda
- Class: Insecta
- Order: Lepidoptera
- Superfamily: Noctuoidea
- Family: Erebidae
- Subfamily: Arctiinae
- Genus: Collita
- Species: C. chinensis

Binomial name
- Collita chinensis (Daniel, 1954)

Synonyms
- Lithosia griseola chinensis Daniel, 1954; Eilema chinensis

Species of moth

Collita chinensis is a moth of the family Erebidae. It is found in Mongolia and China (Shensi, Shaanxi, Heilongjang).

The wingspan is 37–39 mm.
