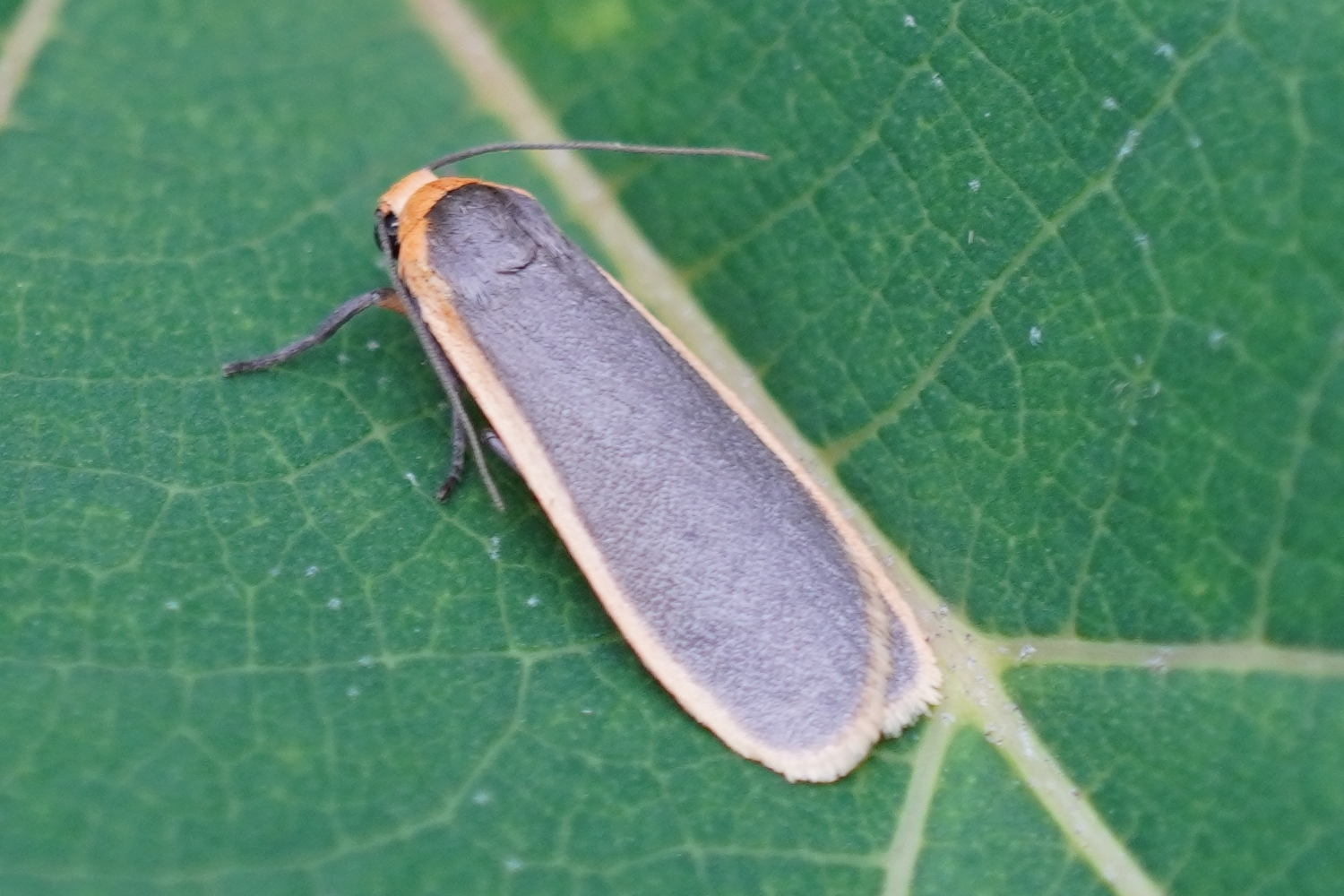

Scientific classification
- Domain: Eukaryota
- Kingdom: Animalia
- Phylum: Arthropoda
- Class: Insecta
- Order: Lepidoptera
- Superfamily: Noctuoidea
- Family: Erebidae
- Subfamily: Arctiinae
- Genus: Manulea
- Species: M. japonica

Binomial name
- Manulea japonica (Leech, [1889])

Synonyms
- Lithosia japonica Leech, [1889] 1888; Pelosia albicostata Hampson, 1901; Eilema japonica; Eilema japonicum; Lithosia ainonis Matsumura, 1927

= Manulea japonica =

Species of moth

Manulea japonica is a moth of the family Erebidae. It is found on the Kuril Islands (Kunashir) and in China (Beijing, Shanxi, Shaanxi, Zhejiang, Yunnan, Sichuan, Tibet), Korea and Japan. It has a wingspan of 25–30 mm.

== Subspecies ==
- Manulea japonica japonica
- Manulea japonica ainonis (Matsumura, 1927) (Kunashir, Japan: Hokkaido)
