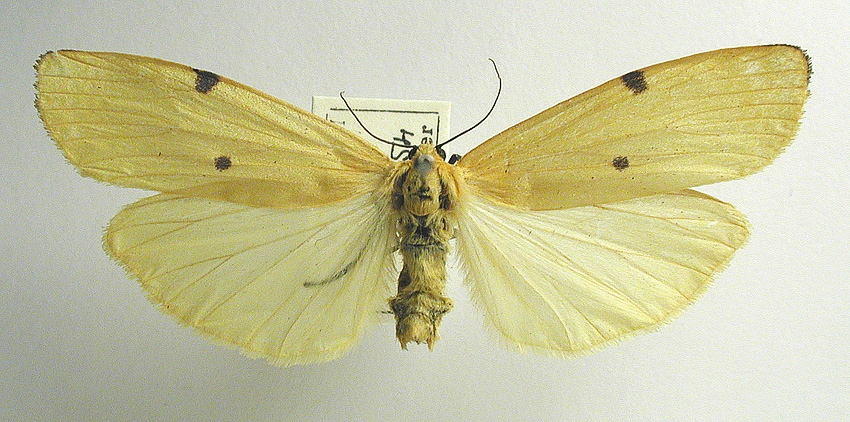
- Mounted female
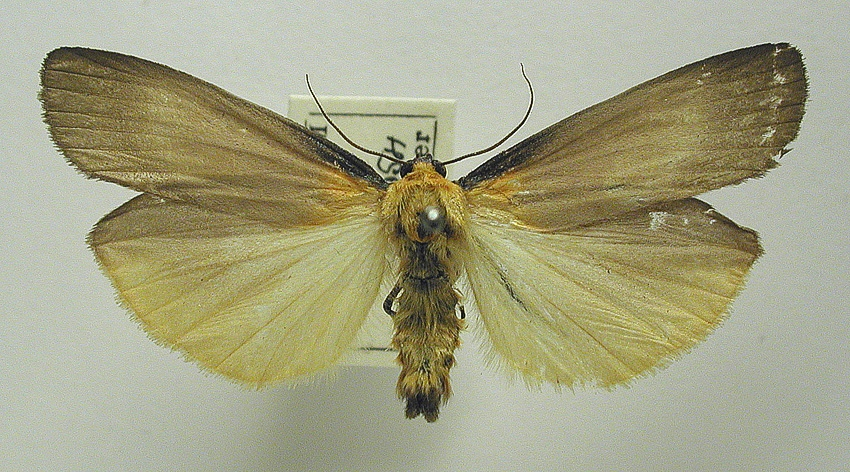
- Mounted male

Scientific classification
- Kingdom: Animalia
- Phylum: Arthropoda
- Class: Insecta
- Order: Lepidoptera
- Superfamily: Noctuoidea
- Family: Erebidae
- Subfamily: Arctiinae
- Genus: Lithosia
- Species: L. quadra

Binomial name
- Lithosia quadra (Linnaeus, 1758)

Synonyms
- Phalaena Noctua quadra Linnaeus, 1758; Phalaena Noctua flaua (flava) Müller, 1764; Phalaena deplana Linnaeus, 1771; Lithosia quadrata Walckenaer, 1802; Oeonistis dives Butler, 1877; Oeonistis insolata Dannehl, 1929

= Lithosia quadra =

Four-spotted footman

Species of moth

Lithosia quadra, the four-spotted footman, is a moth of the family Erebidae. It is found in southern and central Europe then east across the Palearctic to the Amur River and Japan. It is also found in the south of Great Britain and Scandinavia.

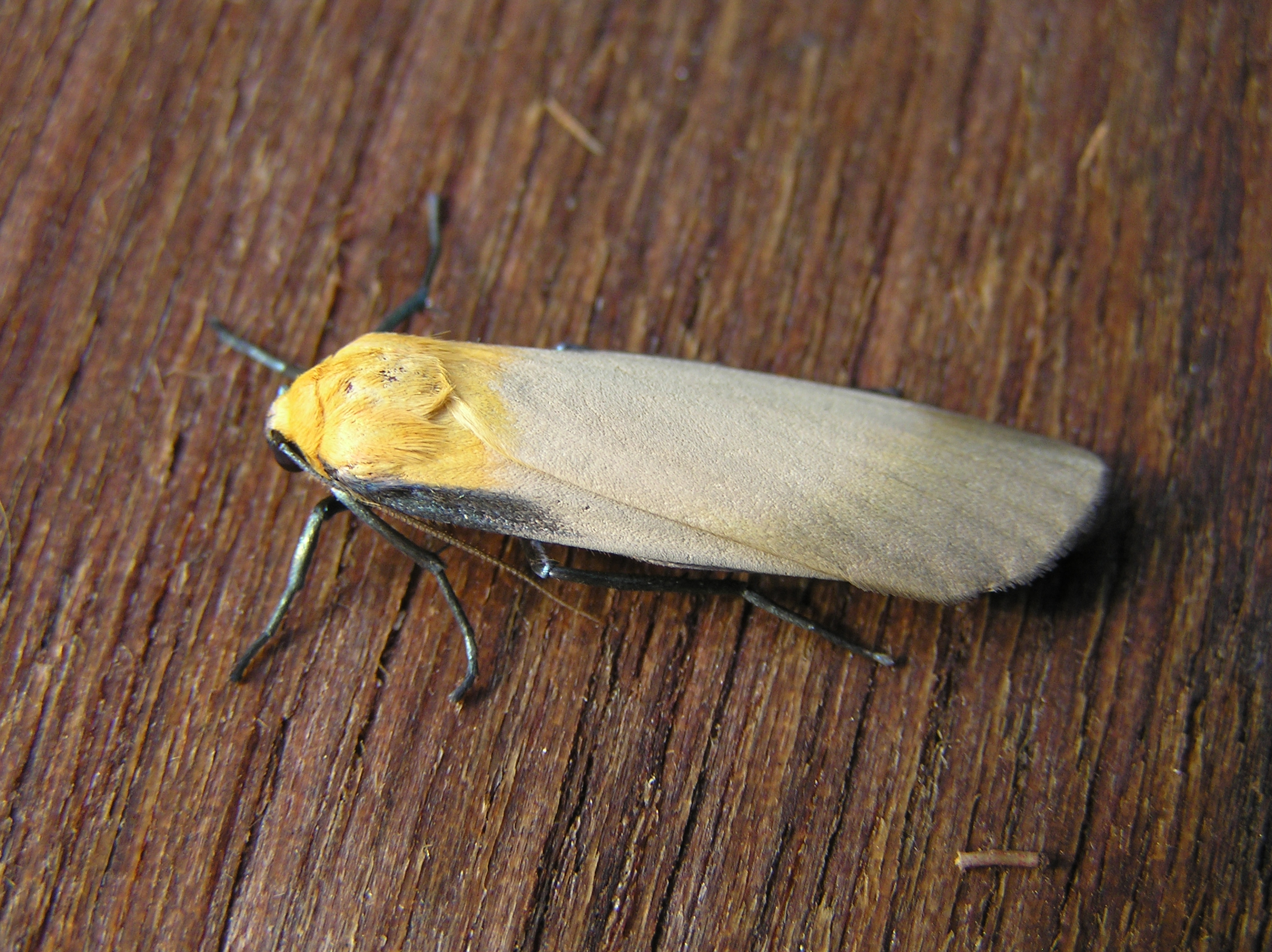
Male

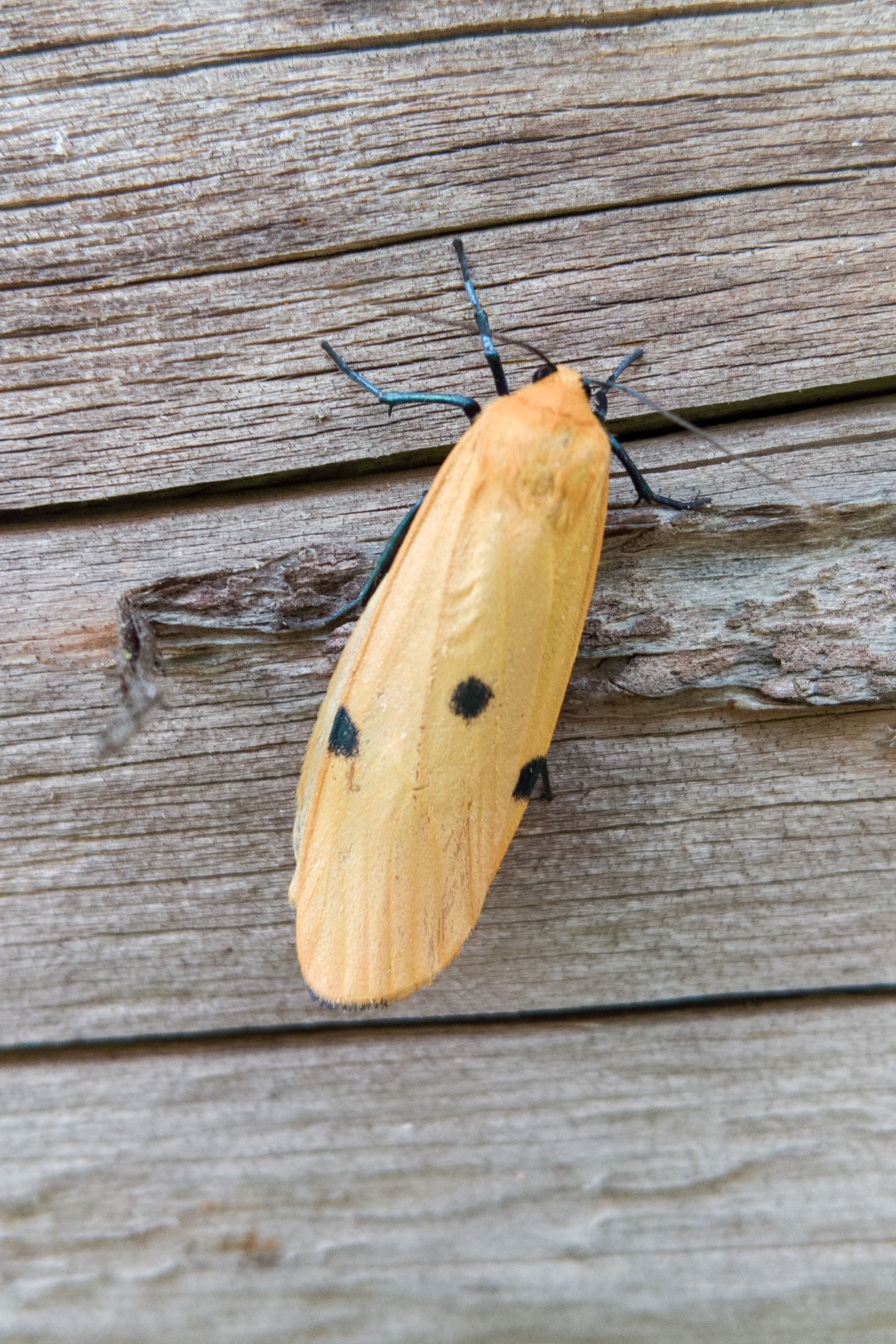
Female

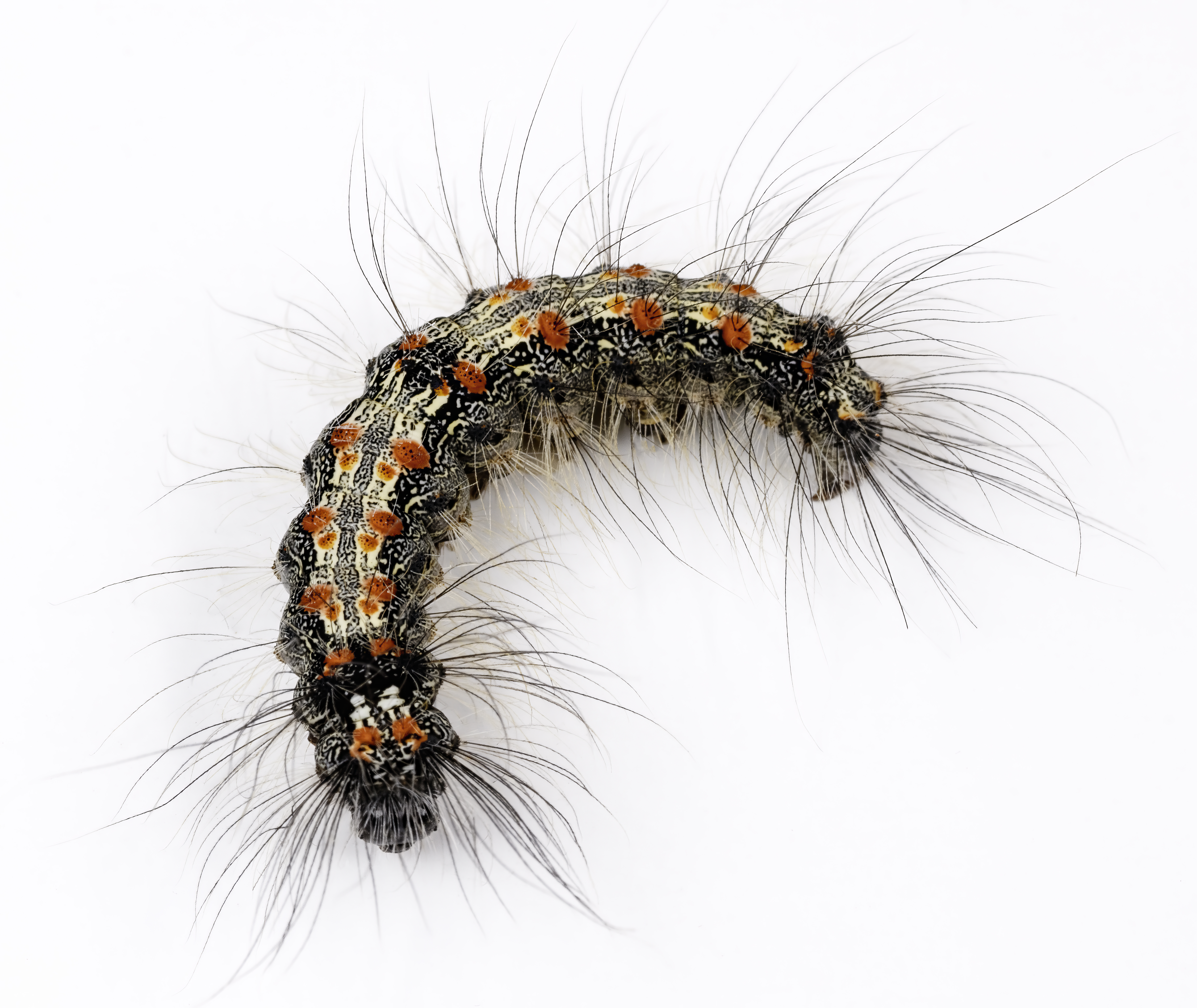
caterpillar

The wingspan is 35–55 mm. The males are smaller than the females. There is strong sexual dimorphism in the imago, the males have gray wings with a yellow wing joint and a blue-black stripe at the front of the outer rim of the forewing. The females have yellow wings with two blue-black dots. It is the biggest species of the subfamily Lithosiinae.

== Technical description and variation ==
The male is much smaller than the female brown grey with a leaden gloss, thorax and base of wings golden yellow, costa metallic blue green at the base. The female yellow, the forewing with a black-blue spot behind the centre of the costa and above the inner margin. The Japanese form, dives Butl, is said to have darker males but the comparison of a large number of specimens proves that this difference is not constant. The European specimens vary considerably, the females with regard to the size and the males in the colouring. In exceptional cases one of the dots (ab. unipuncta Spul.) or both (ab. impunctata Spul.) may be absent in the female, or replaced by a transverse band (ab. fasciata Spul, confluens Dumont)

== Biology ==
The moth flies from June to September depending on the location. In the south of the area there is occasionally a second brood.

Larva slate grey, with thin longitudinal lines, a transverse black spot each across the back anteriorly, in the centre and behind, and subdorsally there are longitudinal rows of small reddish yellow warts. The larvae feed on lichen and algae growing on trees, especially oak, walls and stones. When the species becomes over-abundant a scarcity of food results; the larvae then attack the leaves and needles of trees, and may become injurious. Pupa black, with a porcelain gloss, stumpy and immobile.
