= Lithosia yuennanensis =

Scientific classification
- Domain: Eukaryota
- Kingdom: Animalia
- Phylum: Arthropoda
- Class: Insecta
- Order: Lepidoptera
- Superfamily: Noctuoidea
- Family: Erebidae
- Subfamily: Arctiinae
- Genus: Lithosia
- Species: L. yuennanensis

Binomial name
- Lithosia yuennanensis (Daniel, 1952)

Synonyms
- Oeonistis quadra yuennanensis Daniel, 1952

Species of moth

Lithosia yuennanensis is a moth of the family Erebidae. It was described by Franz Daniel in 1952. It is found in Yunnan, China.
