= Brunia gibonica =

Scientific classification
- Domain: Eukaryota
- Kingdom: Animalia
- Phylum: Arthropoda
- Class: Insecta
- Order: Lepidoptera
- Superfamily: Noctuoidea
- Family: Erebidae
- Subfamily: Arctiinae
- Genus: Brunia
- Species: B. gibonica

Binomial name
- Brunia gibonica (Černý, 2009)

Synonyms
- Eilema gibonica Černý, 2009

Species of moth

Brunia gibonica is a moth of the family Erebidae. It was described by Karel Černý in 2009. It is found in Thailand and southern Vietnam.
