= Lithosia taishanica =

Scientific classification
- Kingdom: Animalia
- Phylum: Arthropoda
- Clade: Pancrustacea
- Class: Insecta
- Order: Lepidoptera
- Superfamily: Noctuoidea
- Family: Erebidae
- Subfamily: Arctiinae
- Genus: Lithosia
- Species: L. taishanica

Binomial name
- Lithosia taishanica Daniel, 1954

Species of moth

Lithosia taishanica is a moth of the family Erebidae. It was described by Franz Daniel in 1954. It is found in Shandong, China.
