= Collita digna =

Scientific classification
- Kingdom: Animalia
- Phylum: Arthropoda
- Clade: Pancrustacea
- Class: Insecta
- Order: Lepidoptera
- Superfamily: Noctuoidea
- Family: Erebidae
- Subfamily: Arctiinae
- Genus: Collita
- Species: C. digna

Binomial name
- Collita digna (Ignatyev et Witt, 2007)

Synonyms
- Eilema digna Ignatyev et Witt, 2007

Species of moth

Collita digna is a moth of the family Erebidae. It is found in the Russian Far East.

The wingspan is about 36 mm for males and 47 mm for females.
