= Manulea predotae =

Scientific classification
- Domain: Eukaryota
- Kingdom: Animalia
- Phylum: Arthropoda
- Class: Insecta
- Order: Lepidoptera
- Superfamily: Noctuoidea
- Family: Erebidae
- Subfamily: Arctiinae
- Genus: Manulea
- Species: M. predotae

Binomial name
- Manulea predotae (Schawerda, 1927)

Synonyms
- Lithosia predotae Schawerda, 1927; Eilema predotae; Lithosia ambrosiana Draudt, 1933

Species of moth

Manulea predotae is a moth of the family Erebidae. It is found in Portugal and Spain.
