= Brunia sarawaca =

Scientific classification
- Domain: Eukaryota
- Kingdom: Animalia
- Phylum: Arthropoda
- Class: Insecta
- Order: Lepidoptera
- Superfamily: Noctuoidea
- Family: Erebidae
- Subfamily: Arctiinae
- Genus: Brunia
- Species: B. sarawaca

Binomial name
- Brunia sarawaca (Butler, 1877)

Synonyms
- Lithosia sarawaca Butler, 1877; Brunia sarawaka; Eilema griseadisca Holloway, 1982

Species of moth

Brunia sarawaca is a moth of the family Erebidae. It was described by Arthur Gardiner Butler in 1877. It is found on Borneo, Peninsular Malaysia, Java and the north-eastern Himalayas. The habitat consists of lowland forests.
