= Brunia cucullata =

Scientific classification
- Domain: Eukaryota
- Kingdom: Animalia
- Phylum: Arthropoda
- Class: Insecta
- Order: Lepidoptera
- Superfamily: Noctuoidea
- Family: Erebidae
- Subfamily: Arctiinae
- Genus: Brunia
- Species: B. cucullata

Binomial name
- Brunia cucullata (Moore, 1878)

Synonyms
- Katha cucullata Moore, 1878; Eilema cucullatella Draudt, 1914; Eilema infuscata Draudt, 1914

Species of moth

Brunia cucullata is a moth of the family Erebidae. It was described by Frederic Moore in 1878. It is found on the Andamans.
