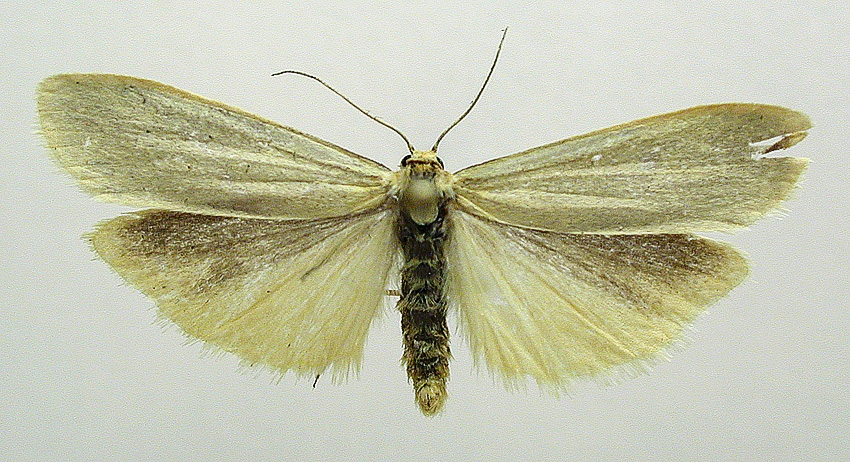

Scientific classification
- Kingdom: Animalia
- Phylum: Arthropoda
- Class: Insecta
- Order: Lepidoptera
- Superfamily: Noctuoidea
- Family: Erebidae
- Subfamily: Arctiinae
- Genus: Manulea
- Species: M. pygmaeola

Binomial name
- Manulea pygmaeola (Doubleday, 1847)

Synonyms
- List: Lithosia pygmaeola Doubleday, 1847; Eilema pygmaeolum; Eilema pygmaeola; Lithosia pallifrons Zeller, 1847; Lithosia marcida Mann, 1859; Lithosia pallifrons saerdabensis Daniel, 1939; Lithosia pallifrons peluri Daniel, 1939; Lithosia pallifrons ab. grisea Fuchs, 1903; Eilema naneola Ragusa, 1889; Lithosia pygmaeola f. obscura Lempke, 1961; Lithosia pallifrons f. sericeola Kanerva, 1935

= Manulea pygmaeola =

Pigmy footman

Species of moth

Manulea pygmaeola, the pigmy footman, is a moth of the family Erebidae. It is found in the western half of the Palearctic realm, east to Altai.

The wingspan is 24–28 mm. There is one generation per year with adults on wing from June to August.

== Subspecies ==
- Manulea pygmaeola pygmaeola
- Manulea pygmaeola banghaasi (Seitz, 1910) (Asia Minor, Transcaucasia)
- Manulea pygmaeola pallifrons (Zeller, 1847) (north-western Africa, Europe, Crimea, Caucasus)
- Manulea pygmaeola saerdabense (Daniel, 1939) (western Kopet Dagh, northern Iran, Mountains of eastern Central Asia)
