= Lithosia szetchuana =

Scientific classification
- Domain: Eukaryota
- Kingdom: Animalia
- Phylum: Arthropoda
- Class: Insecta
- Order: Lepidoptera
- Superfamily: Noctuoidea
- Family: Erebidae
- Subfamily: Arctiinae
- Genus: Lithosia
- Species: L. szetchuana

Binomial name
- Lithosia szetchuana Sterneck, 1938

Species of moth

Lithosia szetchuana is a moth of the subfamily Arctiinae. It was described by Sterneck in 1938. It is found in China.
