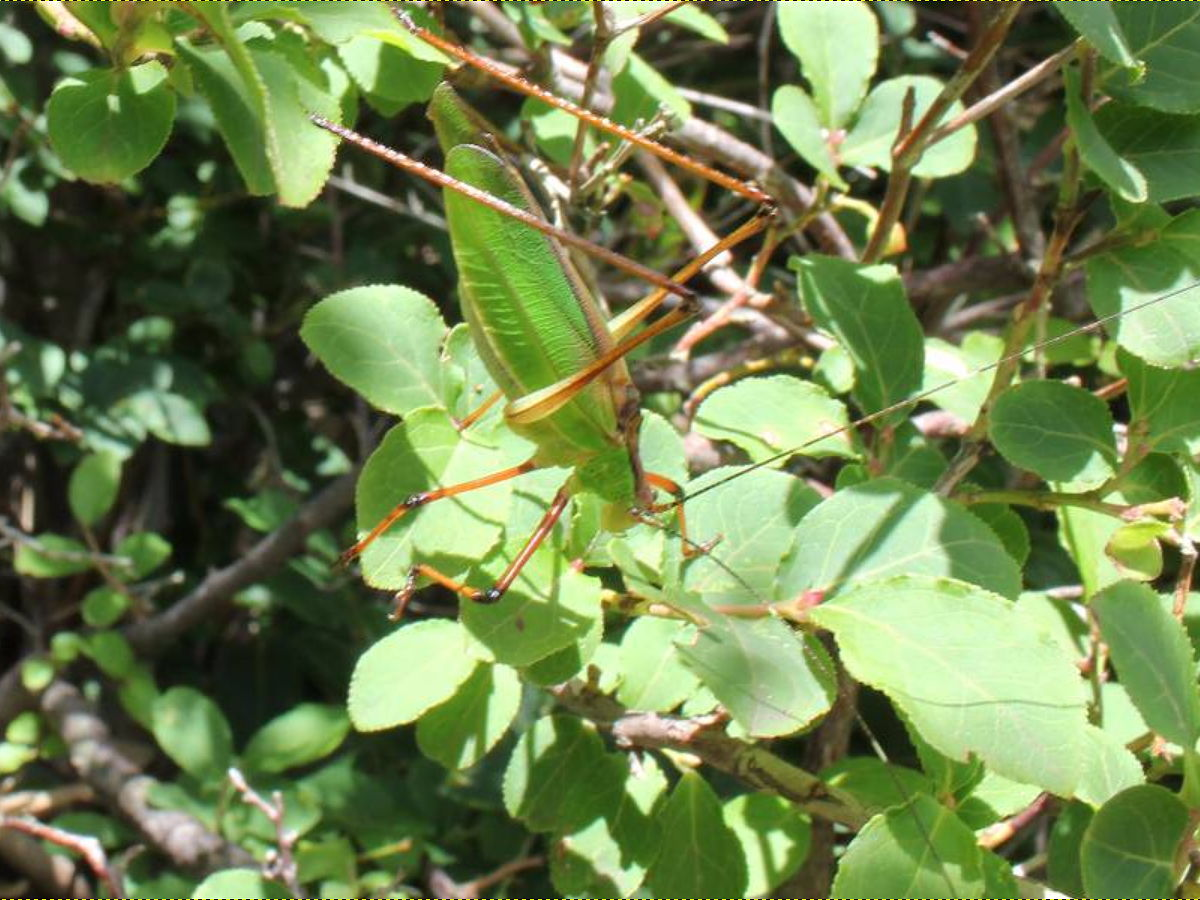
- S. japonica

Scientific classification
- Kingdom: Animalia
- Phylum: Arthropoda
- Clade: Pancrustacea
- Class: Insecta
- Order: Orthoptera
- Suborder: Ensifera
- Family: Tettigoniidae
- Subfamily: Phaneropterinae
- Genus: Shirakisotima; Furukawa, 1963
- Species: S. japonica

Binomial name
- Shirakisotima japonica (Matsumura & Shiraki, 1908)

= Shirakisotima =

Genus of cricket-like animals

Shirakisotima is a genus of the Ducetiini, a tribe of Asian bush crickets (subfamily Phaneropterinae).

There is one recognized species, Shirakisotima japonica.
