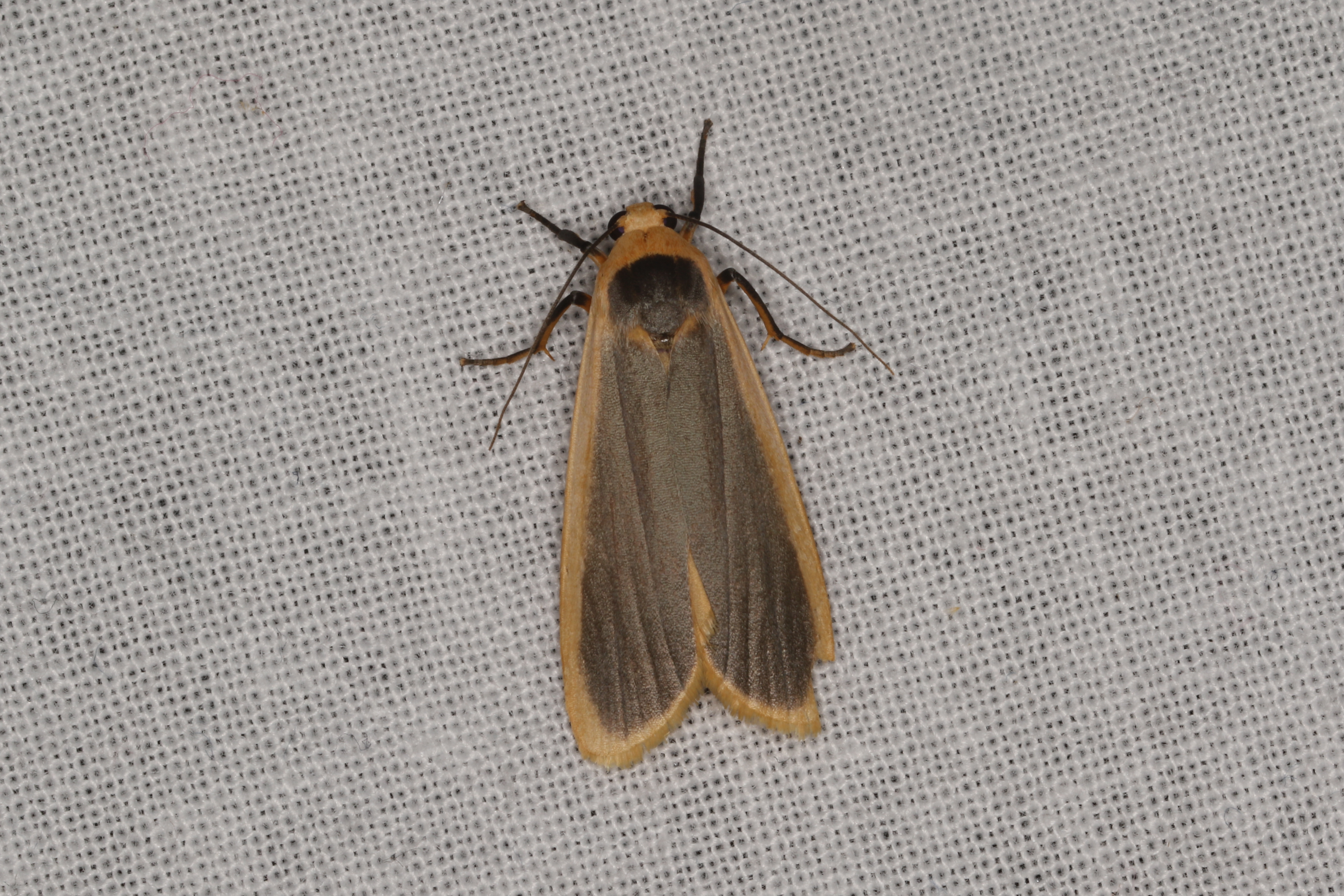
- Smithfield Regional Park, near JCU Cairns, Queensland, 18 January 2016

Scientific classification
- Kingdom: Animalia
- Phylum: Arthropoda
- Clade: Pancrustacea
- Class: Insecta
- Order: Lepidoptera
- Superfamily: Noctuoidea
- Family: Erebidae
- Subfamily: Arctiinae
- Genus: Brunia
- Species: B. dorsalis

Binomial name
- Brunia dorsalis (Walker, 1866)

Synonyms
- Lithosia dorsalis Walker, 1866; Brunia harpophora Meyrick, 1886; Ilema testacea louisiadensis Rothschild, 1912; Manulea dorsalis; Ilema dorsalis; Eilema griseaplagata Bethune-Baker

= Brunia dorsalis =

Species of moth

Brunia dorsalis is a species of moth of the family Erebidae. It was described by Francis Walker in 1866. It is found in the Northern Territory, Queensland, the Sula Islands, the Louisiade Archipelago and New Guinea.
