= Manulea nankingica =

Scientific classification
- Domain: Eukaryota
- Kingdom: Animalia
- Phylum: Arthropoda
- Class: Insecta
- Order: Lepidoptera
- Superfamily: Noctuoidea
- Family: Erebidae
- Subfamily: Arctiinae
- Genus: Manulea
- Species: M. nankingica

Binomial name
- Manulea nankingica (Daniel, 1954)

Synonyms
- Lithosia nankingica Daniel, 1954; Eilema nankingica; Eilema nankingicum

Species of moth

Manulea nankingica is a moth of the family Erebidae first described by Franz Daniel in 1954. It is found in the Russian Far East (Primorye), China (Jiangsu), Korea and Japan.

== Names ==
- Japanese:ニセキマエホソバ "nisekimae(false eye) hosoba"
- korean:앞노랑불나방 "front yellow fire moth"
