= Collita okanoi =

Scientific classification
- Kingdom: Animalia
- Phylum: Arthropoda
- Class: Insecta
- Order: Lepidoptera
- Superfamily: Noctuoidea
- Family: Erebidae
- Subfamily: Arctiinae
- Genus: Collita
- Species: C. okanoi

Binomial name
- Collita okanoi (Inoue, 1961)

Synonyms
- Eilema okanoi Inoue, 1961; Eilema griseolum montana Okano, 1954

Species of moth

Collita okanoi is a moth of the family Erebidae. It is found on the southern Kuriles (Kunashir, Shikotan) and in Japan (Hokkaido, Honshu, Kyushu).

The wingspan is 28–32 mm.
