= Brunia nebulifera =

Scientific classification
- Kingdom: Animalia
- Phylum: Arthropoda
- Class: Insecta
- Order: Lepidoptera
- Superfamily: Noctuoidea
- Family: Erebidae
- Subfamily: Arctiinae
- Genus: Brunia
- Species: B. nebulifera

Binomial name
- Brunia nebulifera (Hampson, 1900)

Synonyms
- Ilema nebulifera Hampson, 1900; Eilema nebulifera

Species of moth

Brunia nebulifera is a moth of the family Erebidae. It was described by George Hampson in 1900. It is found on Borneo and in Singapore. The habitat consists of lowland forests, including lowland dipterocarp forests, mangroves and disturbed areas.
