= Manulea flavociliata =

Scientific classification
- Domain: Eukaryota
- Kingdom: Animalia
- Phylum: Arthropoda
- Class: Insecta
- Order: Lepidoptera
- Superfamily: Noctuoidea
- Family: Erebidae
- Subfamily: Arctiinae
- Genus: Manulea
- Species: M. flavociliata

Binomial name
- Manulea flavociliata (Lederer, 1853)

Synonyms
- Lithosia flavociliata Lederer, 1853; Eilema flavociliata; Eilema flavociliatum; Lithosia ochraceola Bremer, 1864; Lithosia flavociliata ab. infuscata Staudinger, 1892; Lithosia flavociliata mienshanica Daniel, 1954; Lithosia flavociliata tibeta Daniel, 1954

Species of moth

Manulea flavociliata is a moth of the family Erebidae. It is found in north-eastern Kazakhstan, southern Siberia, the Russian Far East, Mongolia, China (Heilongjiang, Beijing, Shanxi, Shaanxi, Sichuan, Tibet, Qinghai, Xinjiang) and Korea.

== Subspecies ==
- Manulea flavociliata flavociliata (Siberia, Russian Far East)
- Manulea flavociliata mienshanica (Daniel, 1954) (China)
- Manulea flavociliata tibeta (Daniel, 1954) (Tibet)
