= Collita gina =

Scientific classification
- Domain: Eukaryota
- Kingdom: Animalia
- Phylum: Arthropoda
- Class: Insecta
- Order: Lepidoptera
- Superfamily: Noctuoidea
- Family: Erebidae
- Subfamily: Arctiinae
- Genus: Collita
- Species: C. gina

Binomial name
- Collita gina (Okano, [1955])

Synonyms
- Eilema gina Okano, 1955

Species of moth

Collita gina is a moth of the family Erebidae. It is found in Japan (Honshu, Tsushima island).

The wingspan is 17–19 mm. The forewings and hindwings are grey-brown.
