= Lithosia atuntseica =

Scientific classification
- Domain: Eukaryota
- Kingdom: Animalia
- Phylum: Arthropoda
- Class: Insecta
- Order: Lepidoptera
- Superfamily: Noctuoidea
- Family: Erebidae
- Subfamily: Arctiinae
- Genus: Lithosia
- Species: L. atuntseica

Binomial name
- Lithosia atuntseica Daniel, 1954

Species of moth

Lithosia atuntseica is a moth of the subfamily Arctiinae. It was described by Franz Daniel in 1954. It is found in China.
