= Brunia ekeikei =

Scientific classification
- Domain: Eukaryota
- Kingdom: Animalia
- Phylum: Arthropoda
- Class: Insecta
- Order: Lepidoptera
- Superfamily: Noctuoidea
- Family: Erebidae
- Subfamily: Arctiinae
- Genus: Brunia
- Species: B. ekeikei

Binomial name
- Brunia ekeikei (Bethune-Baker, 1904)

Synonyms
- Ilema ekeikei Bethune-Baker, 1904; Brunia germana Rothschild, 1912; Brunia perplexa Rothschild, 1912

Species of moth

Brunia ekeikei is a moth of the family Erebidae. It was described by George Thomas Bethune-Baker in 1904. It is found in New Guinea.
