= Manulea costalis =

Scientific classification
- Kingdom: Animalia
- Phylum: Arthropoda
- Clade: Pancrustacea
- Class: Insecta
- Order: Lepidoptera
- Superfamily: Noctuoidea
- Family: Erebidae
- Subfamily: Arctiinae
- Genus: Manulea
- Species: M. costalis

Binomial name
- Manulea costalis (Zeller, 1847)

Synonyms
- Lithosia costalis Zeller, 1847; Eilema costalis; Lithosia morosina Herrich-Schäffer, 1948 [1847]; Eilema morosina; Cossa nubecula Moore, 1879; ?Prabhasa fimbriata Hampson, 1894

Species of moth

Manulea costalis is a moth of the family Erebidae. It is found in Albania, Bulgaria, Serbia, North Macedonia, Greece and on Crete, as well as in Turkey and Armenia. on the Andamans and from India to Myanmar.
