= Lithosia gynaegrapha =

Scientific classification
- Domain: Eukaryota
- Kingdom: Animalia
- Phylum: Arthropoda
- Class: Insecta
- Order: Lepidoptera
- Superfamily: Noctuoidea
- Family: Erebidae
- Subfamily: Arctiinae
- Genus: Lithosia
- Species: L. gynaegrapha

Binomial name
- Lithosia gynaegrapha de Joannis, 1930

Species of moth

Lithosia gynaegrapha is a moth of the subfamily Arctiinae. It was described by Joseph de Joannis in 1930. It is found in Vietnam.
