= Brunia testacea =

Scientific classification
- Domain: Eukaryota
- Kingdom: Animalia
- Phylum: Arthropoda
- Class: Insecta
- Order: Lepidoptera
- Superfamily: Noctuoidea
- Family: Erebidae
- Subfamily: Arctiinae
- Genus: Brunia
- Species: B. testacea

Binomial name
- Brunia testacea (Rothschild, 1912)

Synonyms
- Ilema testacea Rothschild, 1912

Species of moth

Brunia testacea is a moth of the family Erebidae. It was described by Rothschild in 1912. It is found on the Solomon Islands.
