= Brunia apicalis =

Scientific classification
- Kingdom: Animalia
- Phylum: Arthropoda
- Class: Insecta
- Order: Lepidoptera
- Superfamily: Noctuoidea
- Family: Erebidae
- Subfamily: Arctiinae
- Genus: Brunia
- Species: B. apicalis

Binomial name
- Brunia apicalis (Walker, 1862)

Synonyms
- Lithosia apicalis Walker, 1862

Species of moth

Brunia apicalis is a moth of the family Erebidae. It was described by Francis Walker in 1862. It is found on Borneo. The habitat consists of forests, ranging from lowlands to 1,200 meters.
