= Lithosia eburneola =

Scientific classification
- Domain: Eukaryota
- Kingdom: Animalia
- Phylum: Arthropoda
- Class: Insecta
- Order: Lepidoptera
- Superfamily: Noctuoidea
- Family: Erebidae
- Subfamily: Arctiinae
- Genus: Lithosia
- Species: L. eburneola

Binomial name
- Lithosia eburneola Turati, 1933

Species of moth

Lithosia eburneola is a moth of the subfamily Arctiinae. It was described by Turati in 1933. It is found in the Karakoram Mountains.
