= Eilema taiwanella =

Scientific classification
- Kingdom: Animalia
- Phylum: Arthropoda
- Clade: Pancrustacea
- Class: Insecta
- Order: Lepidoptera
- Superfamily: Noctuoidea
- Family: Erebidae
- Subfamily: Arctiinae
- Genus: Eilema
- Species: E. taiwanella

Binomial name
- Eilema taiwanella (Matsumura, 1927)

Synonyms
- Lithosia taiwanella Matsumura, 1927

Species of moth

Eilema taiwanella is a moth of the subfamily Arctiinae. It is found in Taiwan.
