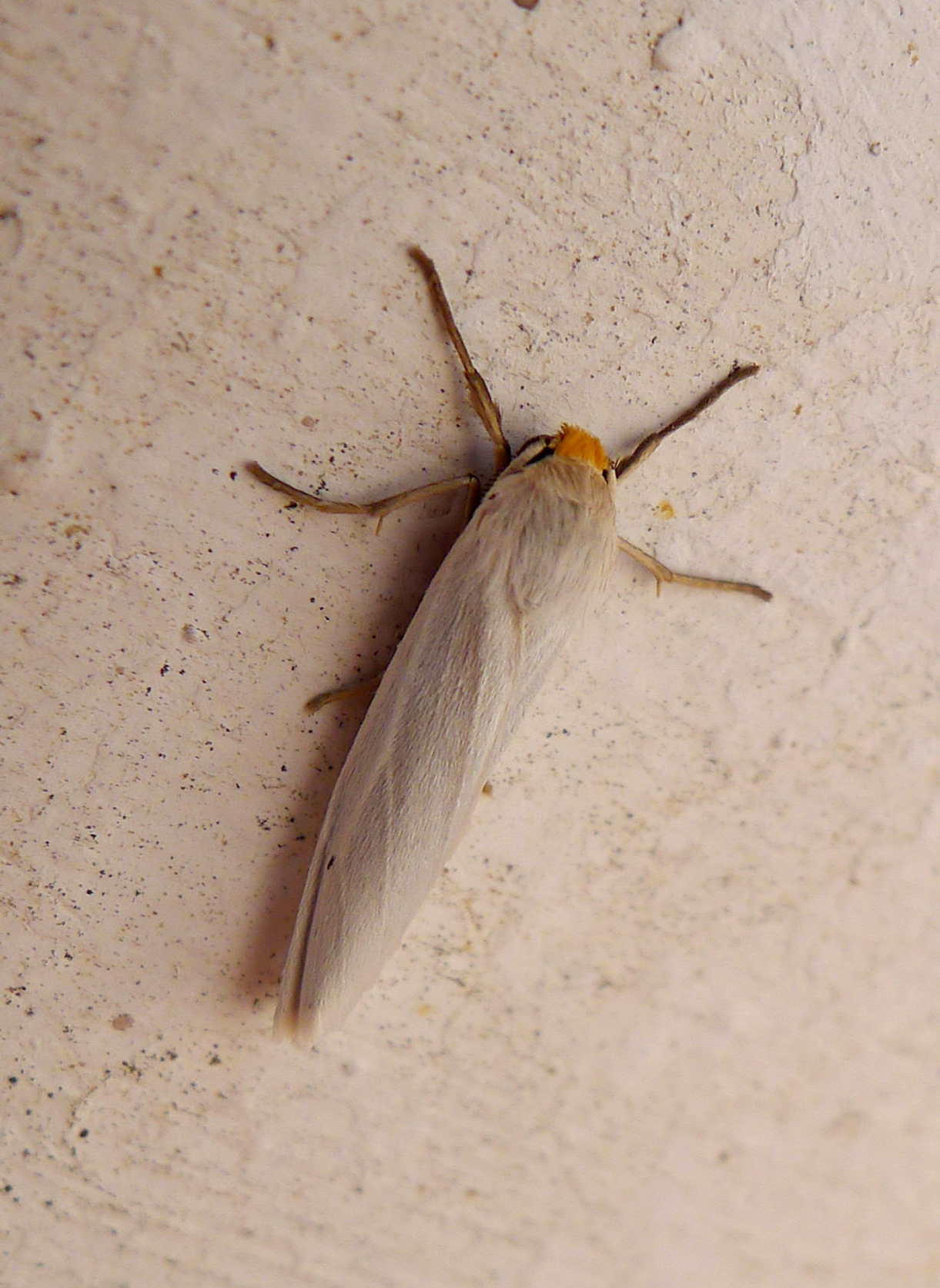

Scientific classification
- Domain: Eukaryota
- Kingdom: Animalia
- Phylum: Arthropoda
- Class: Insecta
- Order: Lepidoptera
- Superfamily: Noctuoidea
- Family: Erebidae
- Subfamily: Arctiinae
- Genus: Manulea
- Species: M. palliatella

Binomial name
- Manulea palliatella (Scopoli, 1763)

Synonyms
- Eilema palliatellum; Eilema palliatella; Phalaena palliatella Scopoli, 1763; Lithosia gilveola Ochsenheimer, 1810; Lithosia gilveola Boisduval, 1834; Lithosia vitellina Treitschke, 1834; Lithosia arideola Hering, 1846; Lithosia flaveola Rambur, 1858; Lithosia petereola Guenée, 1861; Lithosia beckeri Guenée, 1861; Lithosia palleola var. arundineola Guenée, 1861; Noctua unita Denis & Schiffermüller, 1775; Bombyx palleola Hübner, [1808]; Ilema sericeoalba Rothschild, 1912; Eilema unita hyrcana Daniel, 1939

= Manulea palliatella =

Species of moth

Manulea palliatella is a moth of the family Erebidae. It is found in southern, central and eastern Europe, Asia Minor, Iran, Afghanistan, Central Asia, Kazakhstan.

The wingspan is 32–36 mm. The moth flies in August depending on the location.

The larvae feed on Trinia glauca and Aster linosyris.

== Subspecies ==
- Manulea palliatella palliatella (southern and central Europe, the Crimea, Caucasus, Transcaucasia, Kazakhstan, Central Asia)
- Manulea palliatella hyrcana (Daniel, 1939)
- Manulea palliatella sericeoalba (Rothschild, 1912) (Kopet Dagh, Iran)
