= Manulea omelkoi =

Scientific classification
- Kingdom: Animalia
- Phylum: Arthropoda
- Clade: Pancrustacea
- Class: Insecta
- Order: Lepidoptera
- Superfamily: Noctuoidea
- Family: Erebidae
- Subfamily: Arctiinae
- Genus: Manulea
- Species: M. omelkoi

Binomial name
- Manulea omelkoi Dubatolov & Zolotuhin, 2011

Species of moth

Manulea omelkoi is a moth of the family Erebidae. It is found in the Russian Far East (Primorskii Krai).

The length of the forewings is 9.5–11.1 mm. The wings are unicolorously yellow.
