= Lithosia clarivenata =

Scientific classification
- Domain: Eukaryota
- Kingdom: Animalia
- Phylum: Arthropoda
- Class: Insecta
- Order: Lepidoptera
- Superfamily: Noctuoidea
- Family: Erebidae
- Subfamily: Arctiinae
- Genus: Lithosia
- Species: L. clarivenata

Binomial name
- Lithosia clarivenata Reich, 1937

Species of moth

Lithosia clarivenata is a moth of the subfamily Arctiinae. It was described by Reich in 1937. It is found in China.
