= Manulea affineola =

Scientific classification
- Domain: Eukaryota
- Kingdom: Animalia
- Phylum: Arthropoda
- Class: Insecta
- Order: Lepidoptera
- Superfamily: Noctuoidea
- Family: Erebidae
- Subfamily: Arctiinae
- Genus: Manulea
- Species: M. affineola

Binomial name
- Manulea affineola (Bremer, 1864)

Synonyms
- Lithosia affineola Bremer, 1864; Eilema calmaria apricina Bryk, [1949] 1948; Lithosia tsinlingica Daniel, 1954; Eilema iwatensis Okano, 1955; Eilema affineola; Eilema affineolum; Eilema tsinlingica; Eilema tsinlingicum

Species of moth

Manulea affineola is a moth of the family Erebidae. It is found in the Russian Far East (Primorye), Korea, China (Shaanxi) and Japan.
