= Manulea wiltshirei =

Scientific classification
- Domain: Eukaryota
- Kingdom: Animalia
- Phylum: Arthropoda
- Class: Insecta
- Order: Lepidoptera
- Superfamily: Noctuoidea
- Family: Erebidae
- Subfamily: Arctiinae
- Genus: Manulea
- Species: M. wiltshirei

Binomial name
- Manulea wiltshirei (Tams, 1939)

Synonyms
- Macrosia wiltshirei Tams, 1939

Species of moth

Manulea wiltshirei is a moth of the family Erebidae. It is found in south-western Asia, including Lebanon.
