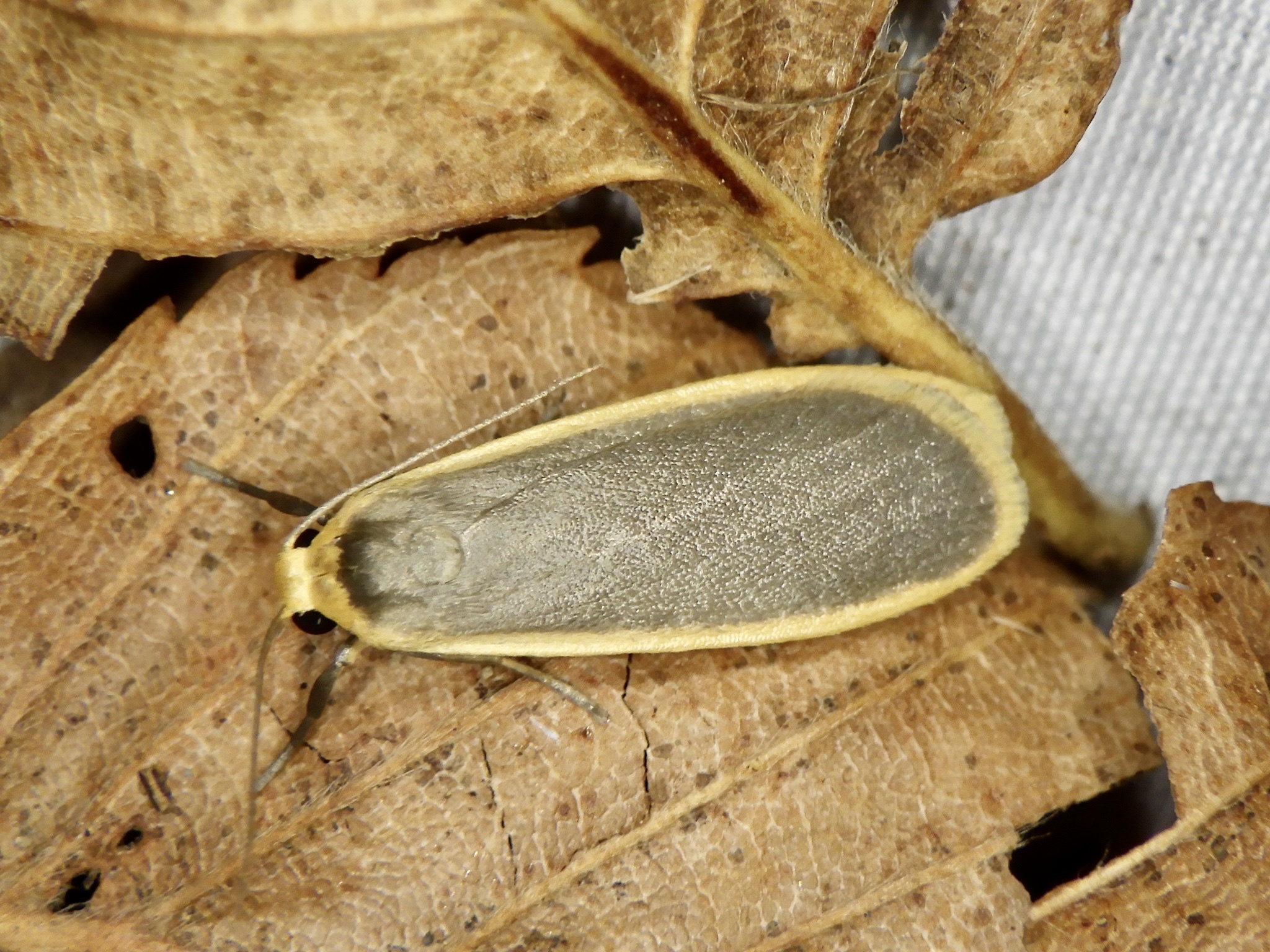

Scientific classification
- Kingdom: Animalia
- Phylum: Arthropoda
- Class: Insecta
- Order: Lepidoptera
- Superfamily: Noctuoidea
- Family: Erebidae
- Subfamily: Arctiinae
- Genus: Manulea
- Species: M. minor

Binomial name
- Manulea minor (Okano, 1955)

Synonyms
- Eilema lurideola minor Okano, 1955; Lithosia minor Okano, 1955; Eilema minor

= Manulea minor =

Species of moth

Manulea minor is a species of moth in the family Erebidae. It is found in the Russian Far East (southern Primorye) and Japan.
