= Brunia badrana =

Scientific classification
- Domain: Eukaryota
- Kingdom: Animalia
- Phylum: Arthropoda
- Class: Insecta
- Order: Lepidoptera
- Superfamily: Noctuoidea
- Family: Erebidae
- Subfamily: Arctiinae
- Genus: Brunia
- Species: B. badrana

Binomial name
- Brunia badrana (Moore, 1859)

Synonyms
- Lithosia badrana Moore, 1859; Ilema badrana; Eilema badrana

Species of moth

Brunia badrana is a moth of the family Erebidae. It was described by Frederic Moore in 1859. It is found on Java and Bali.
