= Brunia fumidisca =

Scientific classification
- Kingdom: Animalia
- Phylum: Arthropoda
- Class: Insecta
- Order: Lepidoptera
- Superfamily: Noctuoidea
- Family: Erebidae
- Subfamily: Arctiinae
- Genus: Brunia
- Species: B. fumidisca

Binomial name
- Brunia fumidisca (Hampson, 1894)

Synonyms
- Lithosia fumidisca Hampson, 1894; Eilema fumidisca; Eilema fumidiscum

Species of moth

Brunia fumidisca is a moth of the family Erebidae. It was described by George Hampson in 1894. The species was described from the Indian state of Sikkim and is also found in Myanmar.
