= Eilema karenkona =

Scientific classification
- Kingdom: Animalia
- Phylum: Arthropoda
- Clade: Pancrustacea
- Class: Insecta
- Order: Lepidoptera
- Superfamily: Noctuoidea
- Family: Erebidae
- Subfamily: Arctiinae
- Genus: Eilema
- Species: E. karenkona

Binomial name
- Eilema karenkona (Matsumura, 1927)

Synonyms
- Lithosia karenkona Matsumura, 1927

Species of moth

Eilema karenkona is a moth of the subfamily Arctiinae. It was described by Shōnen Matsumura in 1927. It is found in Japan.
