= Manulea pseudofumidisca =

Scientific classification
- Kingdom: Animalia
- Phylum: Arthropoda
- Clade: Pancrustacea
- Class: Insecta
- Order: Lepidoptera
- Superfamily: Noctuoidea
- Family: Erebidae
- Subfamily: Arctiinae
- Genus: Manulea
- Species: M. pseudofumidisca

Binomial name
- Manulea pseudofumidisca Dubatolov & Zolotuhin, 2011

Species of moth

Manulea pseudofumidisca is a moth of the family Erebidae. It is found in Russia, North Korea and China (Zhejiang, Hunan, Gansu).

The length of the forewings is 10.3–11.7 mm for males and about 13.9 mm for females.
