= Manulea uniformeola =

Scientific classification
- Domain: Eukaryota
- Kingdom: Animalia
- Phylum: Arthropoda
- Class: Insecta
- Order: Lepidoptera
- Superfamily: Noctuoidea
- Family: Erebidae
- Subfamily: Arctiinae
- Genus: Manulea
- Species: M. uniformeola

Binomial name
- Manulea uniformeola (Daniel, 1954)

Synonyms
- Lithosia uniformeola Daniel, 1954; Eilema uniformeola

Species of moth

Manulea uniformeola is a moth of the family Erebidae. It is found in China.
