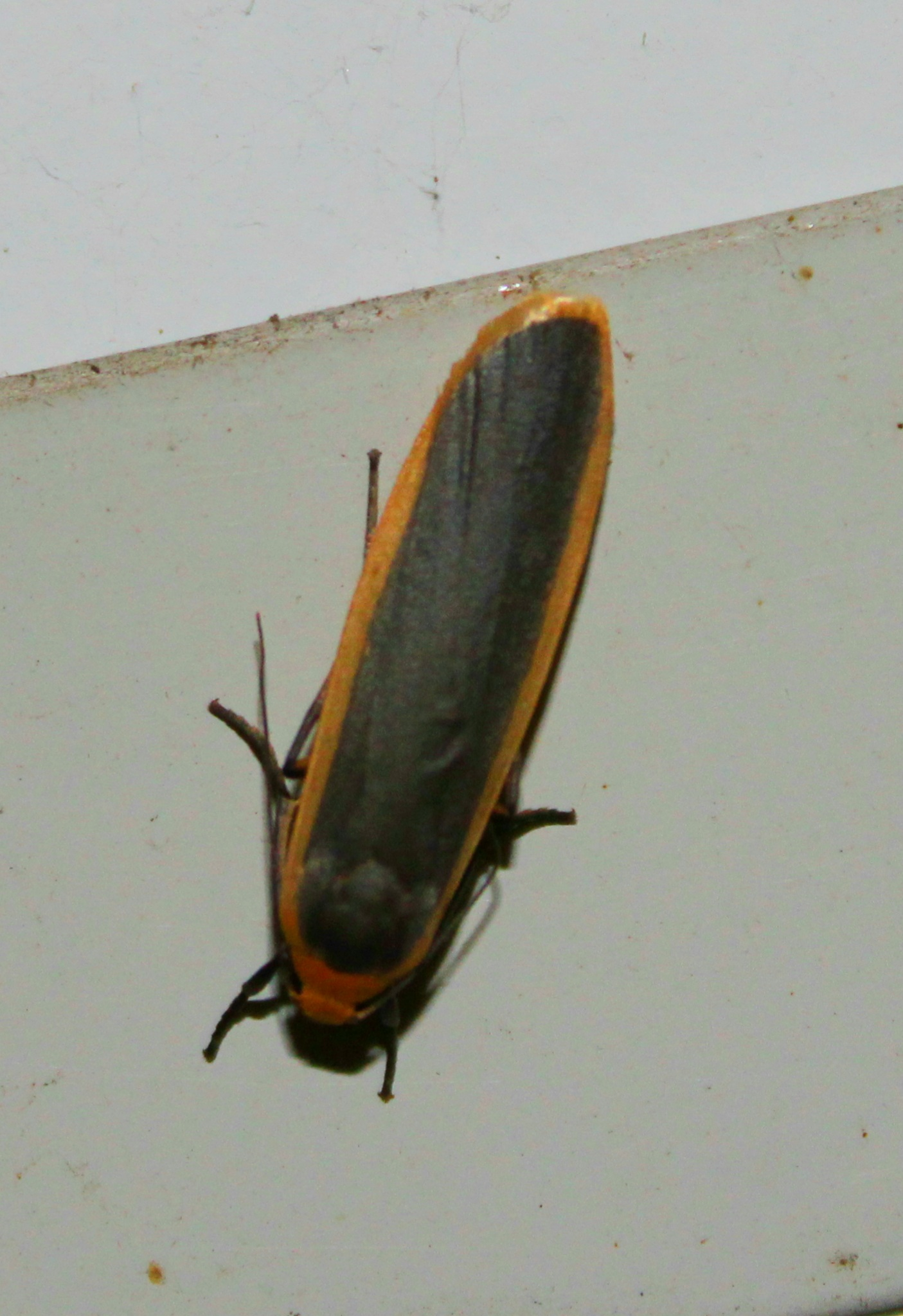

Scientific classification
- Kingdom: Animalia
- Phylum: Arthropoda
- Class: Insecta
- Order: Lepidoptera
- Superfamily: Noctuoidea
- Family: Erebidae
- Subfamily: Arctiinae
- Genus: Brunia
- Species: B. antica

Binomial name
- Brunia antica (Walker 1854)

Synonyms
- Lithosia antica Walker, 1854; Eilema antica; Lithosia brevipennis Walker, 1854; Lithosia natara Moore, 1859 [1860]; Lithosia intermixta Walker, 1864; Ilema atrifrons Hampson, 1907; Eilema kosemponensis Strand, 1917; Lithosia horishanella Matsumura, 1927

= Brunia antica =

Species of moth

Brunia antica is a moth of the family Erebidae described by Francis Walker in 1854. It is found from the Indian subregion, Sri Lanka to China, the Ryukyu Islands, the Chagos Archipelago, the Nicobar Islands and Sundaland.

== Description ==
This species has a wingspan of 26 mm. Forewings with vein 9 anastomosing (fusing) with vein 8 to form an areole. Cilia yellow and hindwings are uniformly yellow. It differs from Brunia complana in wanting the broad yellow marginal band of forewing on underside.

== Ecology ==
The biology is unknown, but the larvae probably feed on lichen and/or algae. It is mostly found in lowland areas, most frequently in coastal vegetation, including mangroves.
