= Manulea ussurica =

Scientific classification
- Domain: Eukaryota
- Kingdom: Animalia
- Phylum: Arthropoda
- Class: Insecta
- Order: Lepidoptera
- Superfamily: Noctuoidea
- Family: Erebidae
- Subfamily: Arctiinae
- Genus: Manulea
- Species: M. ussurica

Binomial name
- Manulea ussurica (Daniel, 1954)

Synonyms
- Lithosia ussurica Daniel, 1954; Eilema ussurica; Eilema ussiricum

Species of moth

Manulea ussurica is a moth of the family Erebidae. It is found in the Russian Far East (Primorye), China (Dunbei, Shanxi, Shaanxi, Jiangsu, Hunan, Zhejiang, Yunan) and Korea.

== Subspecies ==
- Manulea ussurica ussurica
- Manulea ussurica shansica (Daniel, 1954) (China)
