= Manulea pseudocomplana =

Scientific classification
- Domain: Eukaryota
- Kingdom: Animalia
- Phylum: Arthropoda
- Class: Insecta
- Order: Lepidoptera
- Superfamily: Noctuoidea
- Family: Erebidae
- Subfamily: Arctiinae
- Genus: Manulea
- Species: M. pseudocomplana

Binomial name
- Manulea pseudocomplana (Daniel, 1939)

Synonyms
- Lithosia pseudocomplana Daniel, 1939; Manulea pseudocomplanum; Eilema pseudocomplana

Species of moth

Manulea pseudocomplana is a moth of the family Erebidae. It is found from central and southern Europe to Ukraine, Turkey and Iran.

== Subspecies ==
- Eilema pseudocomplana pseudocomplana
- Eilema pseudocomplana iberica Mentzer, 1980
