= Manulea hunanica =

Scientific classification
- Domain: Eukaryota
- Kingdom: Animalia
- Phylum: Arthropoda
- Class: Insecta
- Order: Lepidoptera
- Superfamily: Noctuoidea
- Family: Erebidae
- Subfamily: Arctiinae
- Genus: Manulea
- Species: M. hunanica

Binomial name
- Manulea hunanica (Daniel, 1954)

Synonyms
- Lithosia hunanica Daniel, 1954; Eilema hunanica

Species of moth

Manulea hunanica is a moth of the family Erebidae. It is found in China (Fujian, Hunan, Guangdong).
