= Manulea minima =

Scientific classification
- Domain: Eukaryota
- Kingdom: Animalia
- Phylum: Arthropoda
- Class: Insecta
- Order: Lepidoptera
- Superfamily: Noctuoidea
- Family: Erebidae
- Subfamily: Arctiinae
- Genus: Manulea
- Species: M. minima

Binomial name
- Manulea minima (Daniel, 1954)

Synonyms
- Lithosia minima Daniel, 1954; Eilema minima

Species of moth

Manulea minima is a moth of the family Erebidae. It is found in China.
