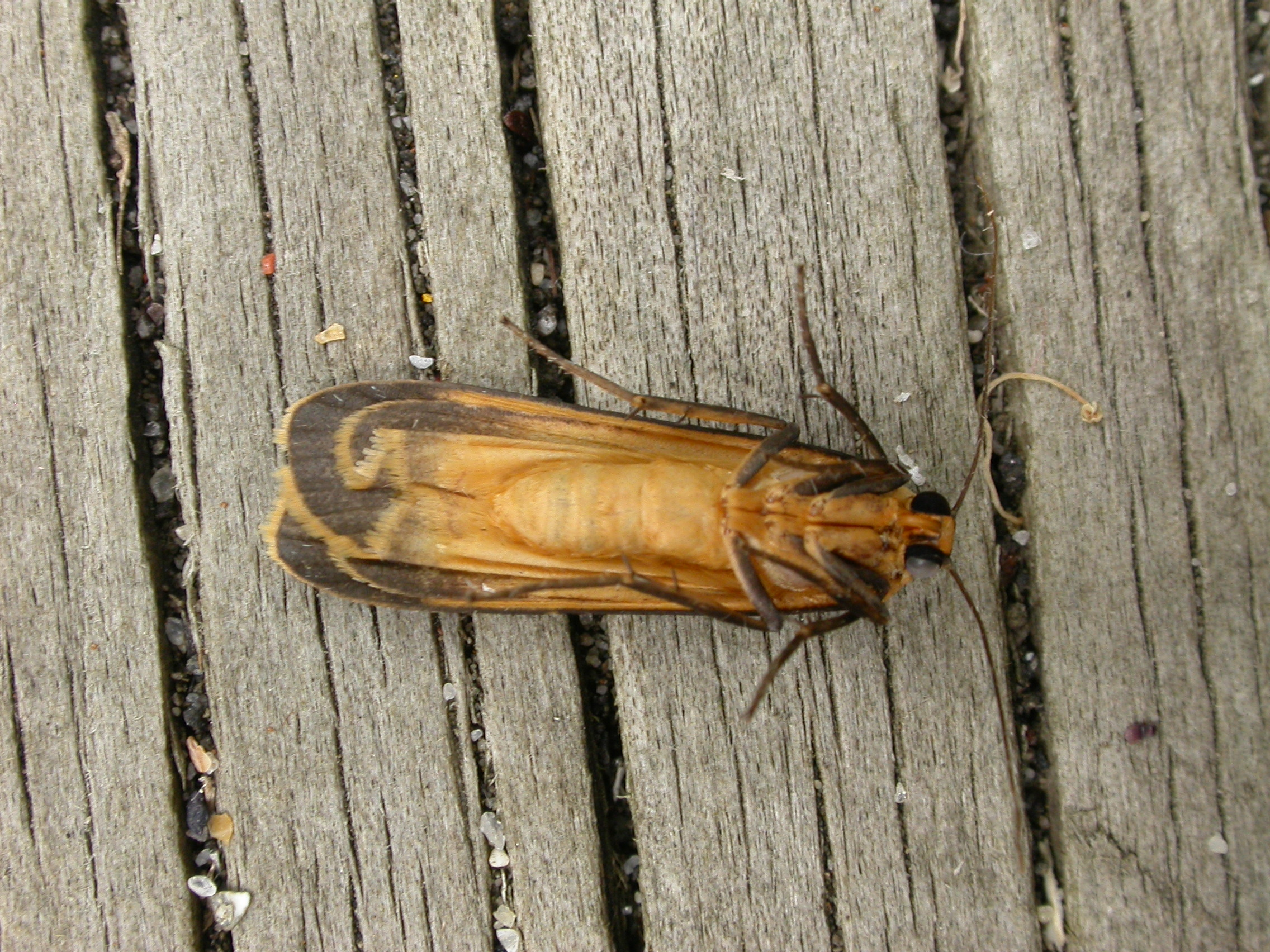

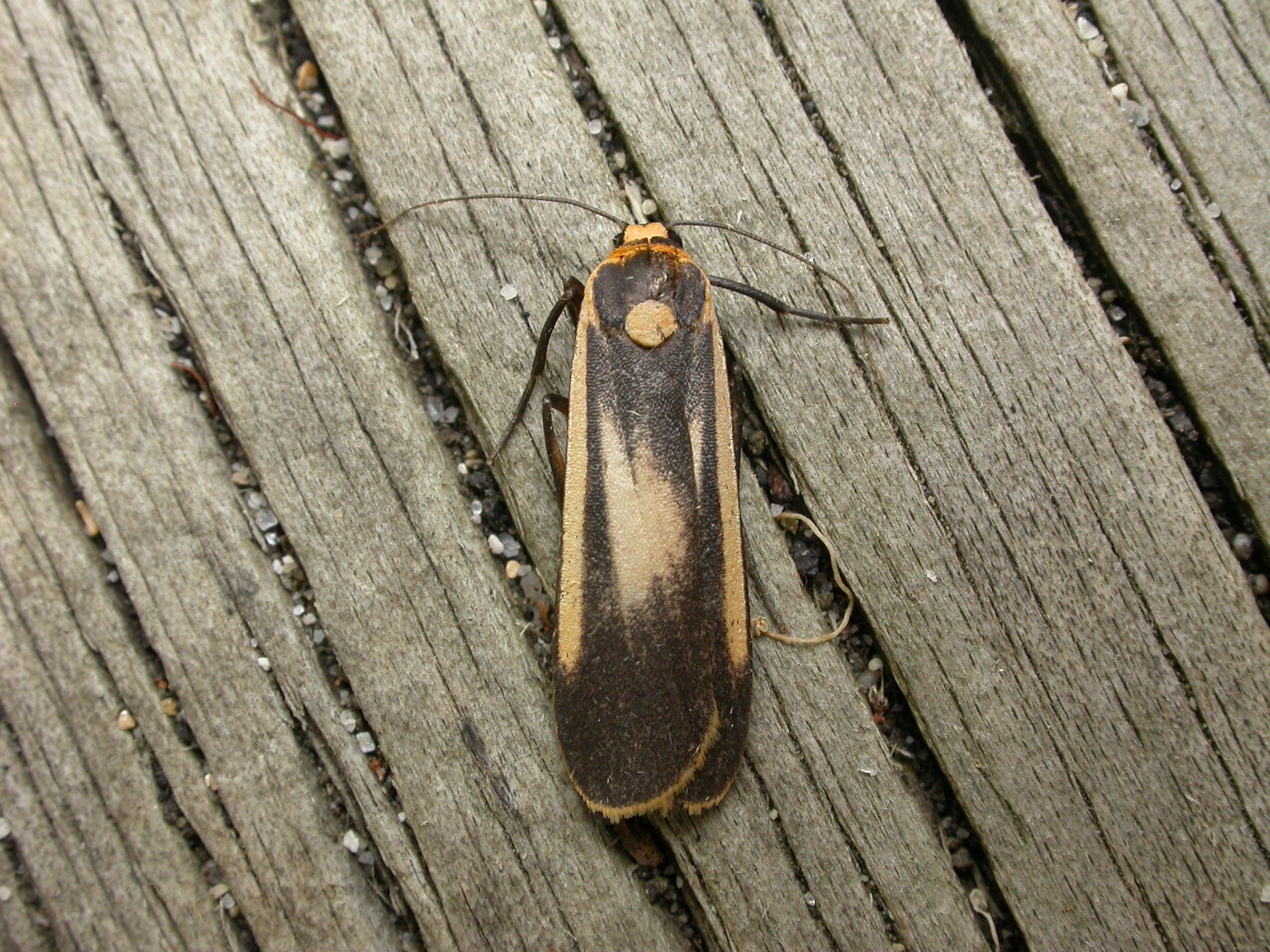

Scientific classification
- Kingdom: Animalia
- Phylum: Arthropoda
- Clade: Pancrustacea
- Class: Insecta
- Order: Lepidoptera
- Superfamily: Noctuoidea
- Family: Erebidae
- Subfamily: Arctiinae
- Genus: Brunia
- Species: B. replana

Binomial name
- Brunia replana (Lewin, 1805)

Synonyms
- Lithosa replana Lewin, 1805; Lithosia dispar Leach, 1814; Manulea replana (Lewin, 1805); Ilema replana (Lewin, 1805)

= Brunia replana =

Species of moth

Brunia replana, the lichen-eating caterpillar or lichen moth, is a species of moth of the subfamily Arctiinae. It is found in Australia (including New South Wales, Queensland and Tasmania) and the caterpillar feeds nocturnally on lichen.

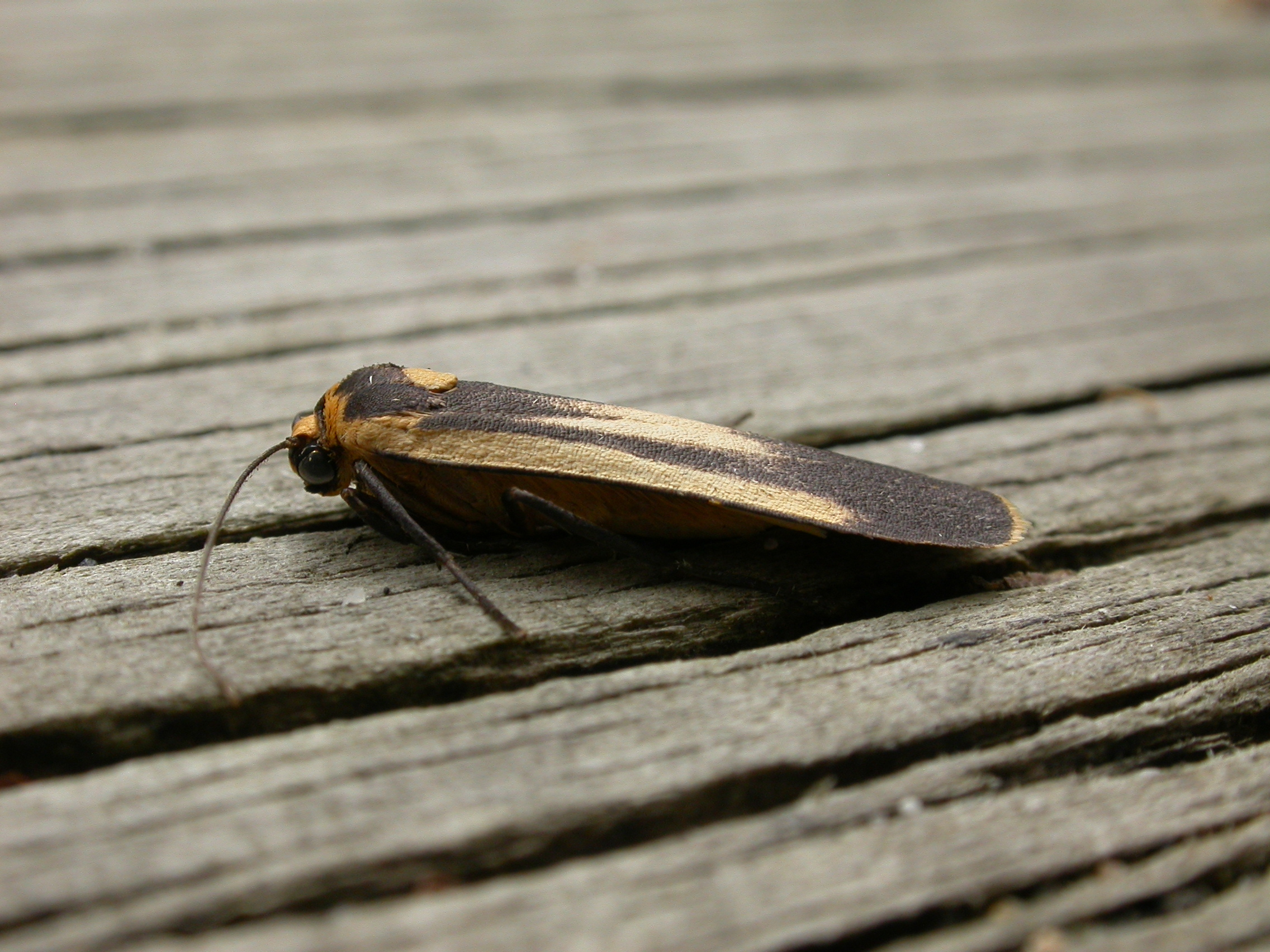

The wingspan is about 30 mm.
