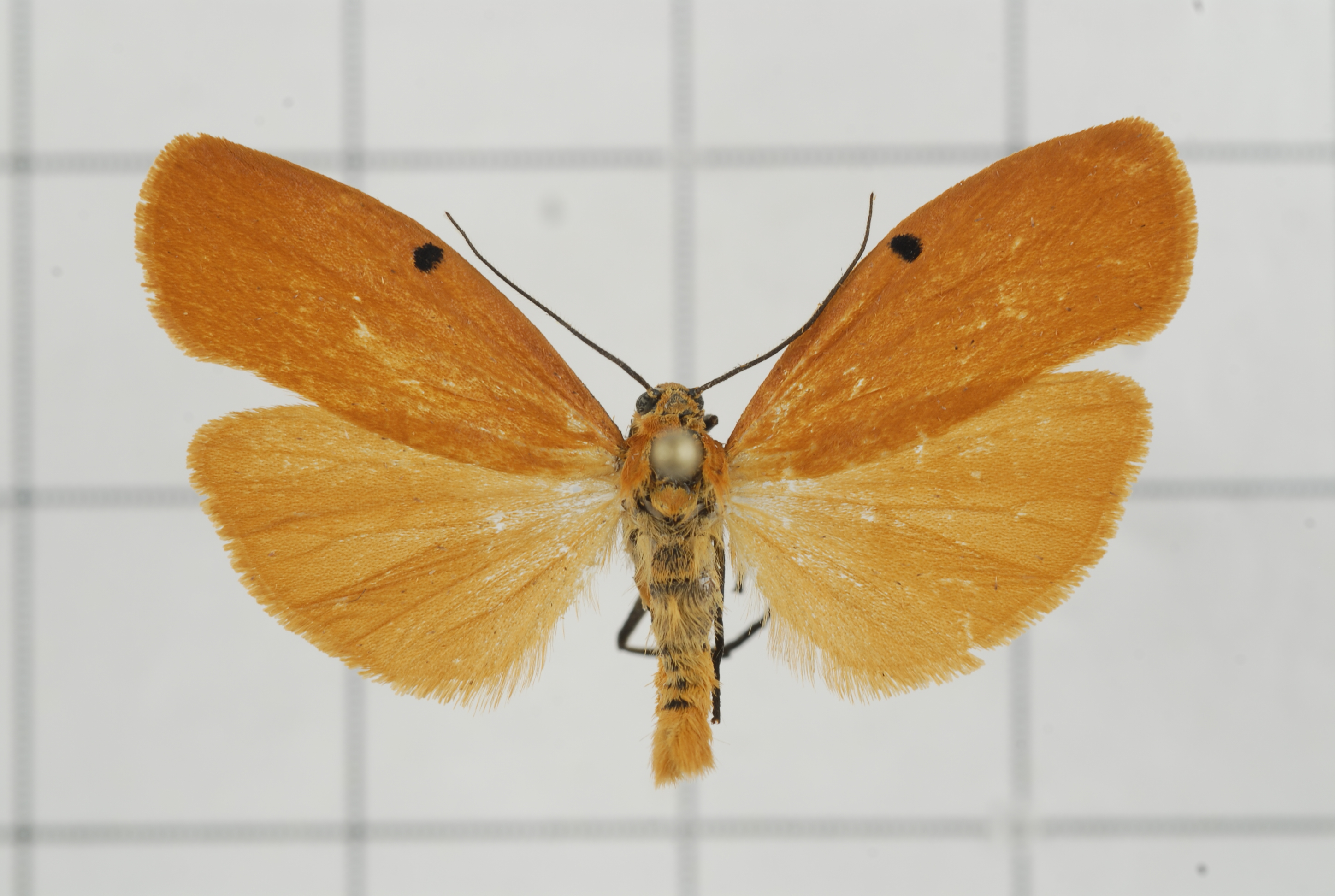

Scientific classification
- Domain: Eukaryota
- Kingdom: Animalia
- Phylum: Arthropoda
- Class: Insecta
- Order: Lepidoptera
- Superfamily: Noctuoidea
- Family: Erebidae
- Subfamily: Arctiinae
- Genus: Eilema
- Species: E. costipuncta

Binomial name
- Eilema costipuncta (Leech, 1890)

Synonyms
- Lithosia costipuncta Leech, 1890; Lithosia postmaculosa Matsumura, 1927

= Eilema costipuncta =

Species of moth

Eilema costipuncta is a moth of the subfamily Arctiinae first described by John Henry Leech in 1890. It is found in China and Taiwan.
