= Manulea kansuensis =

Scientific classification
- Domain: Eukaryota
- Kingdom: Animalia
- Phylum: Arthropoda
- Class: Insecta
- Order: Lepidoptera
- Superfamily: Noctuoidea
- Family: Erebidae
- Subfamily: Arctiinae
- Genus: Manulea
- Species: M. kansuensis

Binomial name
- Manulea kansuensis (Hering, 1936)

Synonyms
- Ilema lurideola kansuensis Hering, 1936; Eilema kansuensis; Lithosia innshanica Daniel, 1939; Lithosia japonica brunnescens Daniel, 1954

Species of moth

Manulea kansuensis is a moth of the family Erebidae. It is found from Russia (Transbaikalia), through Mongolia to Gansu, China.
