= Institute of Systematics and Ecology of Animals =

Russian research institute

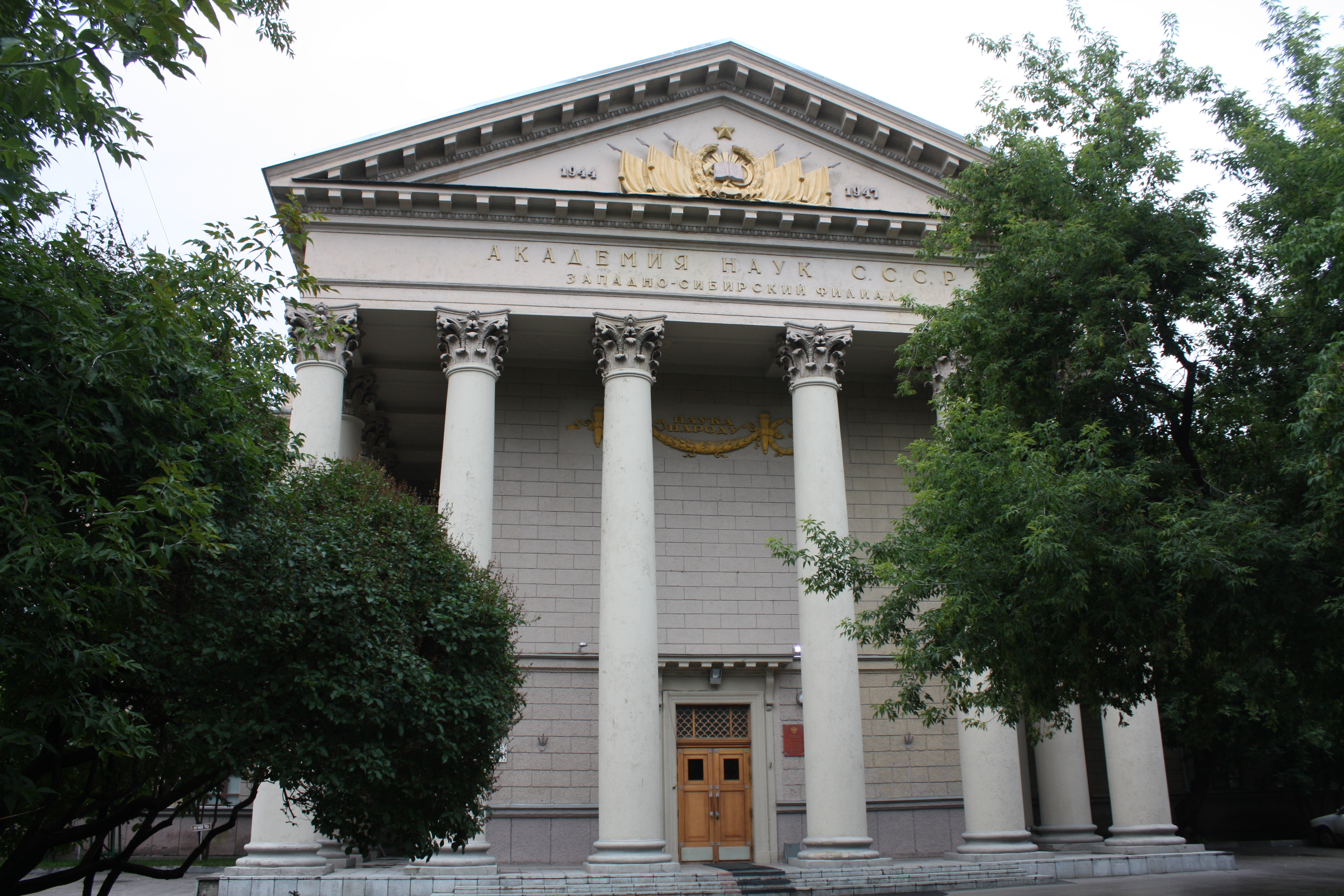
- Established: 1944
- Director: Victor V. Glupov, Prof, ScD
- Staff: 166 (as of 2013)
- Owner: Siberian Branch of RAS
- Formerly called: Biomedical Institute, Biological Institute
- Address: Frunze street, 11, Novosibirsk, 630091, Russia
- Location: Novosibirsk, Russia
- Website: http://www.eco.nsc.ru

The Institute of Systematics and Ecology of Animals (ISEA) (Russian: Институт систематики и экологии животных, ИСЭЖ (Note: Or ИСиЭЖ.)) located in Novosibirsk is one of the oldest research organization in the Siberian Branch of the Russian Academy of Sciences (SB RAS). The institute was founded in 1944 as Biomedical Institute, the first Siberian academic establishment working in biology. The Siberian Zoological Museum of the ISEA SB RAS has the third-largest coleopteran collection in Russia. Some Siberian research organizations as the Central Siberian Botanical Garden SB RAS and the Institute of Soil Science and Agricultural Chemistry SB RAS were derived from the Institute former laboratories.

== General background ==
The Institute research mission is the study of animal populations and communities structural and functional organization (as the base of living systems sustainable being and evolution) along with community ecology and biodiversity (animal systematics, inventory, monitoring and animal resource assessment).

The ISEA international activities include collaboration with researchers from the United Kingdom, Germany, the United States, Japan and China.

== History ==
The institute was formed as the Biomedical Institute in 1944 due to the special Order of the USSR Sovnarkom (1943 (Note: Order No 1149, 21 October 1943)). It was renamed a few times:

- 1944 — the Biomedical Institute, the USSR Academy of Sciences West Siberian affiliate;
- 1953 — the Biological Institute, the USSR Academy of Sciences West Siberian affiliate;
- 1959 — the Biological Institute, the USSR Academy of Sciences Siberian Branch;
- 1991 — the Biological Institute, the Russian Academy of Sciences Siberian Branch;
- 1993 — the Institute of Systematics and Ecology of Animals, the Russian Academy of Sciences Siberian Branch.

== Institute directors ==
- 1944—1951 — Victor V. Reverdatto, Prof, ScD
- 1951—1953 — Sergey U. Stroganov, Prof, ScD
- 1953—1954 — S. I. Gluzdakov, PhD
- 1954—1955 — Kira A. Sobolevskaya, Prof, ScD
- 1955—1978 — Alexey I. Cherepanov, Prof, ScD
- 1978—2006 — Vadim I. Evsikov, Corresponding Member of RAS, Prof, ScD
- since 2006 — Victor V. Glupov, Prof, ScD.

== Research units ==
There are seven laboratories, (Note: There were eight including Insect Ecology Laboratory (Lab Head: Anatoly Yu. Kharitonov, Prof, ScD) until May 2013) one special research team, three research stations and one affiliated research and production unit in the institute.

=== Laboratories ===
- The Insect Pathology Laboratory (Lab Head: Ivan M. Dubovskiy, ScD);
- The Invertebrate Systematics Laboratory (Lab Head: Anatoly V. Barkalov, ScD);
- The Laboratory of Behavioral Ecology of Animal Communities (Lab Head: Zhanna I. Reznikova, Prof, ScD);
- The Laboratory of Vertebrate Community Ecology (Lab Head: Yury N. Litvinov, ScD);
- The Philogeny and Faunogenesis Laboratory (Lab Head: Andrei A. Legalov, ScD);
- The Population Structure and Dynamics Laboratory (Lab Head: Galina G. Nazarova, ScD);
- The Zoomonitoring Laboratory (Lab Head: Yury S. Ravkin, Prof, ScD).

Special research team

- The Research Group in Avian Ecology (Team Head: Alexander K. Yurlov, PhD).

=== Research stations ===
- The Karasuk research station (Head: Vladimir A. Shilo, PhD);
- The Chany research station (Head: Alexander K. Yurlov, PhD);
- The Teletsky research station (Head: Igor I. Chupin, PhD).

== The Siberian Zoological Museum ==
The Museum appeared in 1960 as a separate laboratory of the institute. Now it is curated by the researchers of the Invertebrate Systematics and the Philogeny&Faunogenesis Laboratories. The Siberian Zoological Museum has a vast scientific collection (650 animal families, more than 25 thousand species, 13 million samples, 1000 holotypes) including the third-largest coleopteran collection in Russia (Note: After Zoological Institute of the Russian Academy of Sciences (ZIN) and Zoological Museum of Moscow University.) as well as some permanent exhibitions.

== The Euroasian Entomological Journal ==
The Euroasian Entomological Journal (Note: ISSN 1684-4866.) started in 2002 due to the Siberian Zoological Museum of the ISEA SB RAS and the Zoological Museum of Moscow State University joint efforts. (Note: The first editor and distribution manager were Sergei E. Tshernyshev from the ISEA SB RAS and Kirill G. Mikhailov from the MSU Zoological Museum.) The Journal publishes original and qualitative scientific papers (Note: In Russian as well as in English.) on insect taxonomy, fauna, ecology, physiology etc. A Head Editor of the Journal is Prof ScD (Biology) Victor V. Glupov, the Director of the ISEA. His three deputies are PhD Sergei E. Tshernyshev (ISEA SB RAS), PhD Kirill G. Mikhailov (the MSU Zoomuseum, Moscow) and ScD Andrei A. Legalov (ISEA SB RAS). There are competent entomologists from recognised research establishments and universities of Russia, Belarus, Ukraine and the United Kingdom in the Journal editorial board. The Journal periodicity is six issues per year.
