= Shōnen Matsumura =

Japanese entomologist

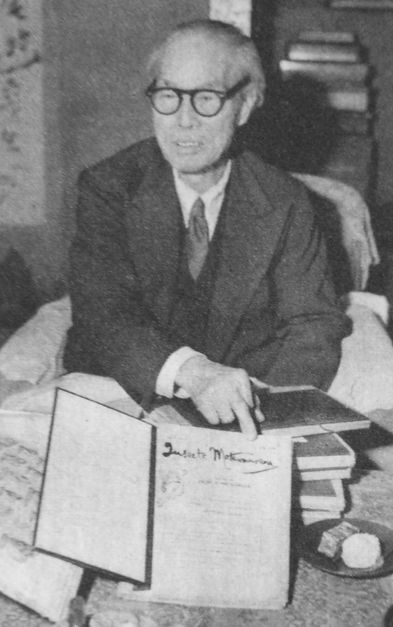
Shōnen Matsumura

Shōnen Matsumura (松村 松年, Matsumura Shōnen; 5 March 1872 – 7 November 1960) was a Japanese entomologist.

Born in Akashi, Hyōgo, Dr. Shōnen Matsumura established Japan's first course on entomology at Hokkaido University. The courses were both applied (on insects of importance in forestry and agriculture) and theoretical. He named over 1,200 species of Japanese insects and in 1926 he founded the entomological journal Insecta Matsumurana. Matsumura wrote many scientific papers and books including 6,000 illustrated Insects of Japan-Empire (1931). He died in Tokyo.

His collection is in Hokkaido University in Sapporo.

== See also ==
- Category:Taxa named by Shōnen Matsumura
