= List of environmental sampling techniques =

Environmental sampling techniques are used in biology, ecology and conservation as part of scientific studies to learn about the flora and fauna of a particular area and establish a habitat's biodiversity, the abundance of species and the conditions in which these species live amongst other information. Where species are caught, researchers often then take the trapped organisms for further study in a lab or are documented by a researcher in the field before the animal is released. This information can then be used to better understand the environment, its ecology, the behaviour of species and how organisms interact with one another and their environment. Here is a list of some sampling techniques and equipment used in environmental sampling:

- Quadrats - used for plants and slow moving animals

== Techniques for birds and/or flying invertebrates and/or bats ==
- Malaise Trap
- Flight Interception Trap
- Harp Trap
- Robinson Trap
- Butterfly Net
- Mist Net

== Techniques for Terrestrial Animals ==
- Transect
- Tullgren Funnel - used for soil-living arthropods
- Pitfall Trap - used for small terrestrial animals like insects and amphibians
- Netting techniques for terrestrial animals
  - Beating Net - used for insects dwelling in trees and shrubs
  - Sweep Netting - used for insects in grasses
- Aspirator/Pooter - used for insects
- Camera Trap - used for larger animals
- Sherman Trap - used for small mammals

== See also ==
- Insect Collecting
- Wildlife Biology
- Sampling
