= Butterfly net =

Net on a stick for catching butterflies

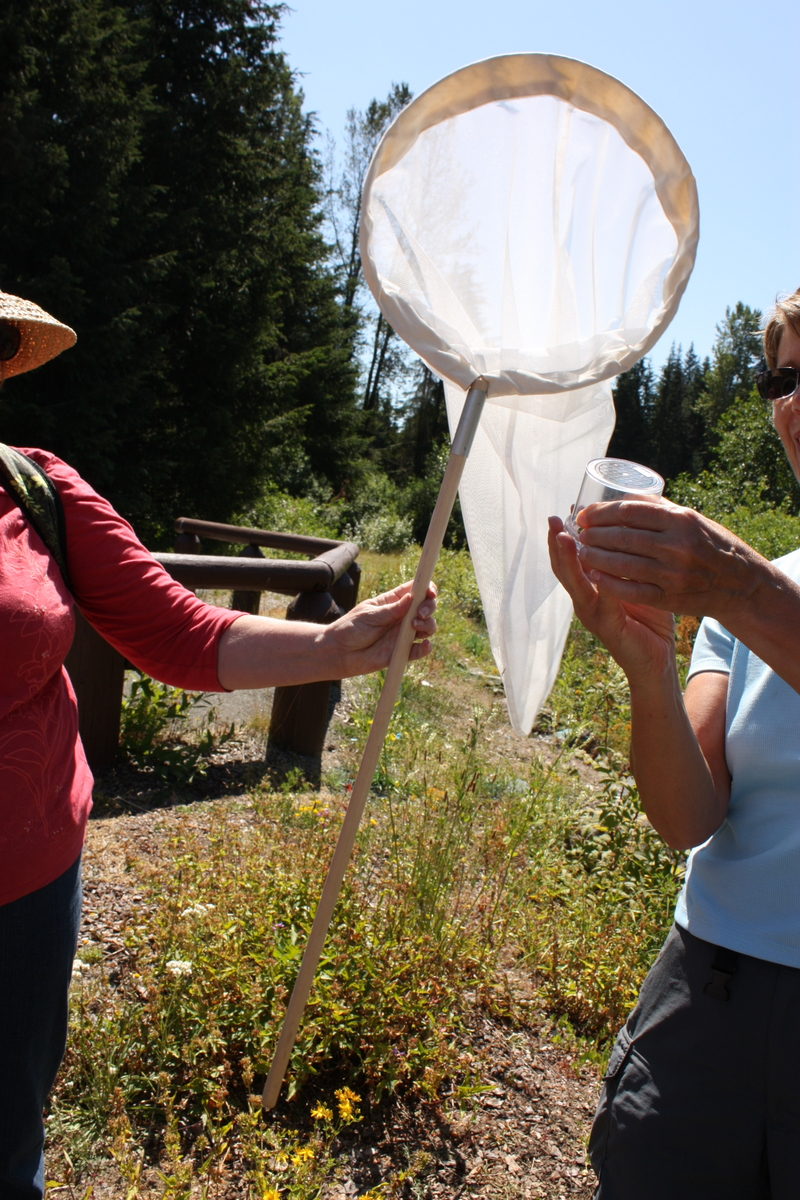
A butterfly net being used in the field

A butterfly net (sometimes called an aerial insect net or bug net) is one of several kinds of nets used to collect insects. The entire bag of the net is generally constructed from a lightweight mesh to minimize damage to delicate butterfly wings. Other types of nets used in insect collecting include beat nets, aquatic nets, and sweep nets.

Nets for catching different insects have different mesh sizes. Aquatic nets usually have bigger, more 'open' mesh. Catching small aquatic creatures usually requires an insect net. The mesh is smaller and can capture more.
