= Caterpillar inflation =

Examples of caterpillar inflation from Canterbury Museum's entomology collection

Caterpillar inflation is a method of specimen preservation found in insect collecting, used mostly during the 19th and early 20th century.

As a method of preservation it has largely been replaced by freeze drying and preservation in alcohol. In some cases caterpillar inflation offers better colour retention than preservation in alcohol, although the rise of colour photography rendered this less important.

A limitation of the technique was that it could produce poor results, in the form of oversized and distended specimens with poor colour, especially if carried out when the caterpillar was moulting or about to undergo pupation.

Colour retention was not always perfect and some collectors painted or dyed their inflated specimens although water colours could distort the skin.

== Technique ==
The caterpillar was first killed. If it was hairy then it was soaked in alcohol for half an hour before being left to dry out. The rear of the caterpillar was then cut open and the contents of the bowels squeezed out by applying gentle pressure to the outside of the caterpillar. Pressure would be applied, working from the rear towards the front of the caterpillar, until the intestines started to protrude from the cut. Forceps would then be used to pull the intestines from the caterpillar's body which would in turn drag out most of the rest of the caterpillar's innards with them. A straw was then inserted into the cut, and air blown into it while the caterpillar was gently heated in order to dry it. For an experienced practitioner the entire process took about 5 to 6 minutes.

Once the caterpillar was dry it was ready to be prepared for mounting. This was done by pushing a loop of wire coated in shellac into the caterpillar via the cut, after which the wire was attached to an entomological pin for mounting in a storage cabinet.

Various devices, such as miniature alcohol heated ovens, were developed to apply the technique with different entomologists taking different approaches.

A closely related technique was to inject the caterpillar with wax after the organ removal stage.
