= Harp trap =

Trap to capture bats

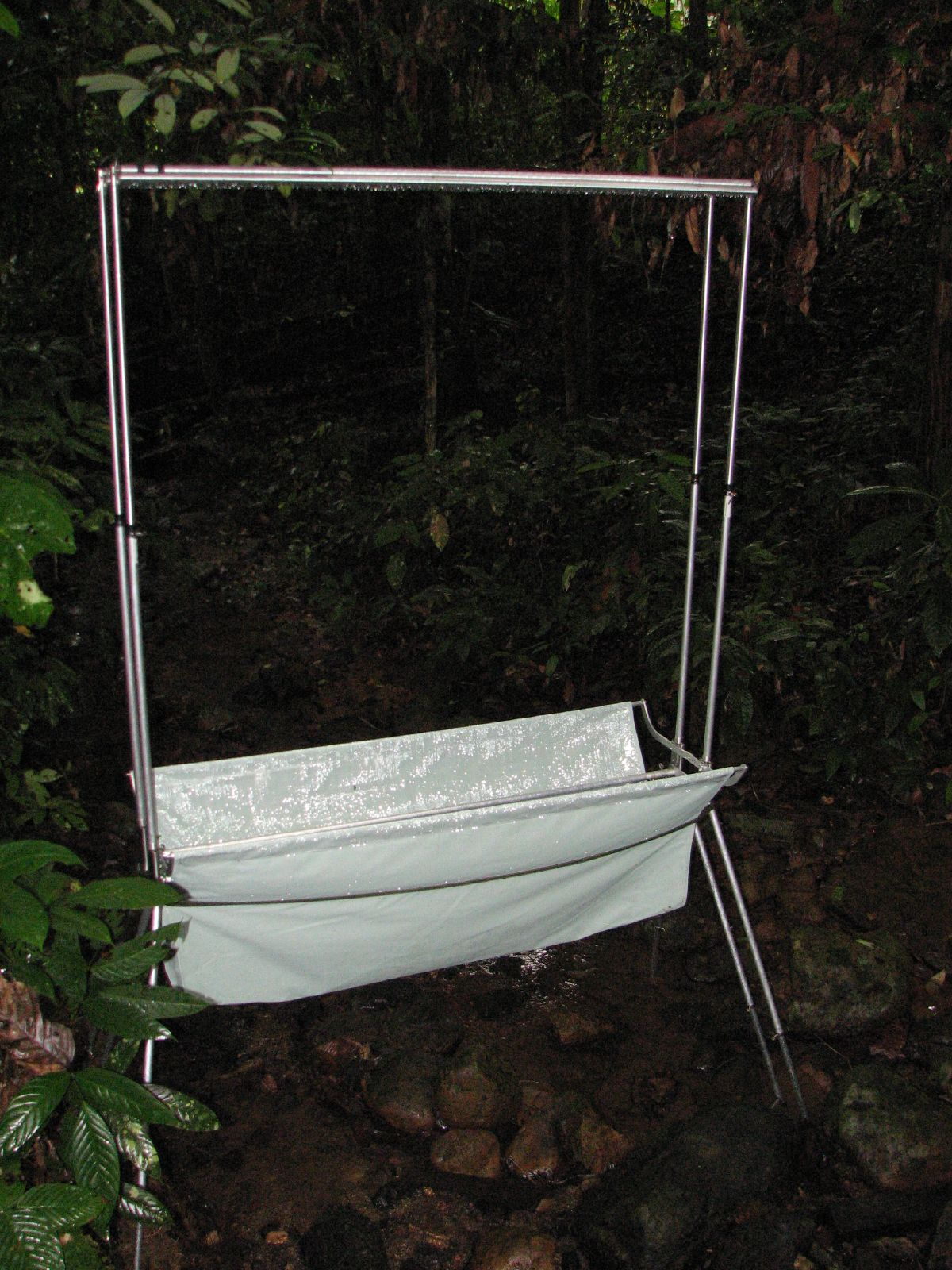
A harp trap in Borneo

A harp trap is a device used to capture bats without exposing them to disentangling from traps like mist nets and hand nets. It capitalizes on bats' flight characteristic of turning perpendicular to the ground to pass between obstacles, in this case the trap's strings, in which flight attitude they cannot maintain their angle of flight and drop unharmed into a collection chamber. Invented in 1958 by US Public Health Service veterinarian Denny Constantine, the harp trap has been modified for different applications and efficiencies by users, including Merlin Tuttle's double harp trap in 1974, Charles Francis' 4-frame harp trap in 1989, and other modifications improving collapsibility and portability.

The harp trap is a significant tool for measuring aspects of bat ecology, most notably to obtain information about bat populations and movement for public health and conservation management purposes. Even though visually apparent when set out in the open, harp traps are effective if placed where natural features funnel bats toward the trap. They can be set across flyways in heavily wooded areas, over small bodies of water, and at roost entrances, and can be left unattended for periods of time, allowing multiple sites to be worked simultaneously. They can be more efficient for surveying bats than mist nets, capturing higher numbers of species and individuals.
