= George Carter Bignell =

English entomologist (1826–1910)

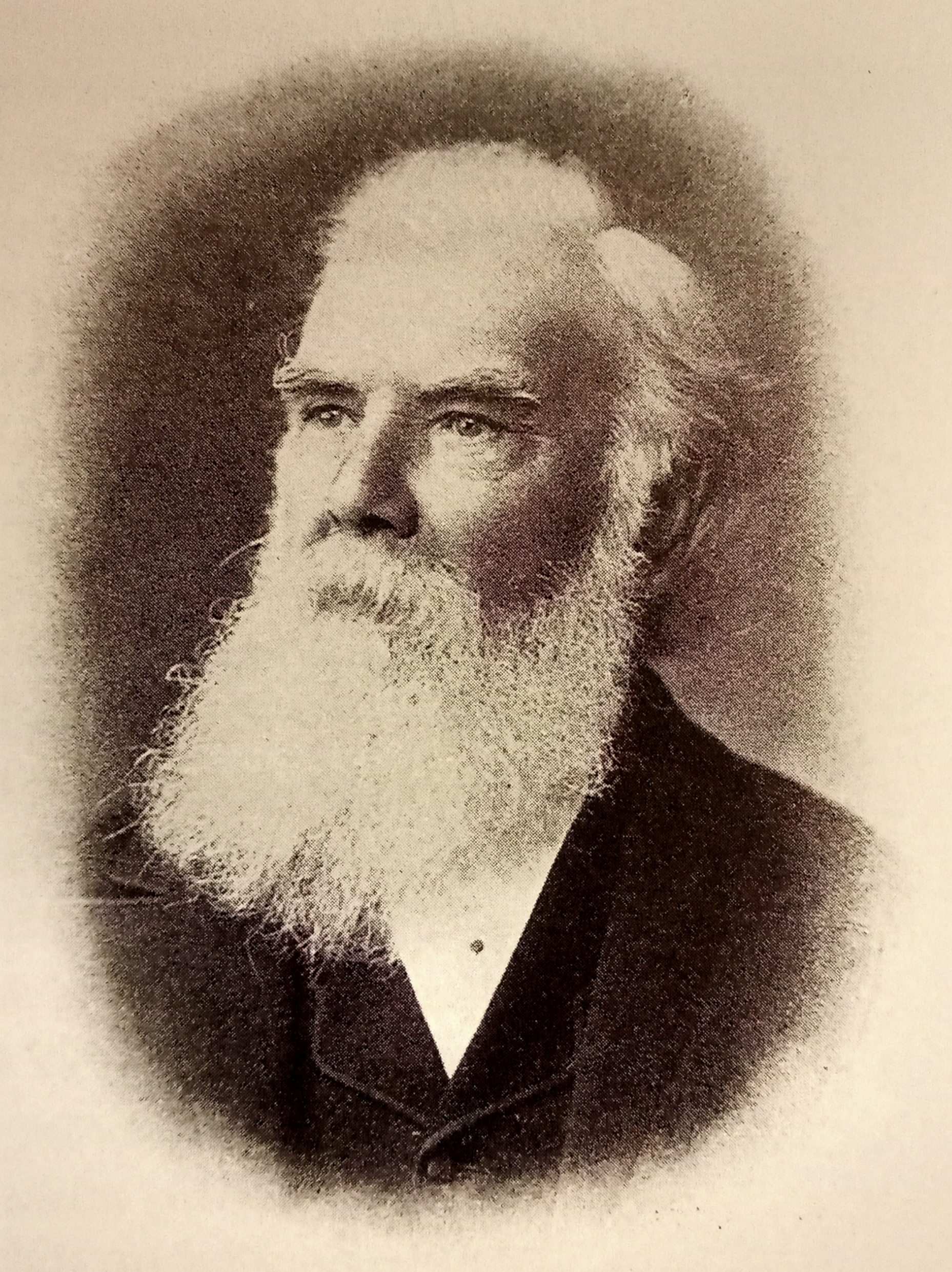

George Carter Bignell (1 March 1826 – 1 March 1910) was an English amateur entomologist. He worked as a clerk, followed by service in the Royal Navy and then as in a public office in Devon, and in his spare time collected insects and was a Fellow of the Entomological Society. He devised methods to capture insects by beating foliage and discovered several new species, particularly of parasitic wasps.

== Life and work ==
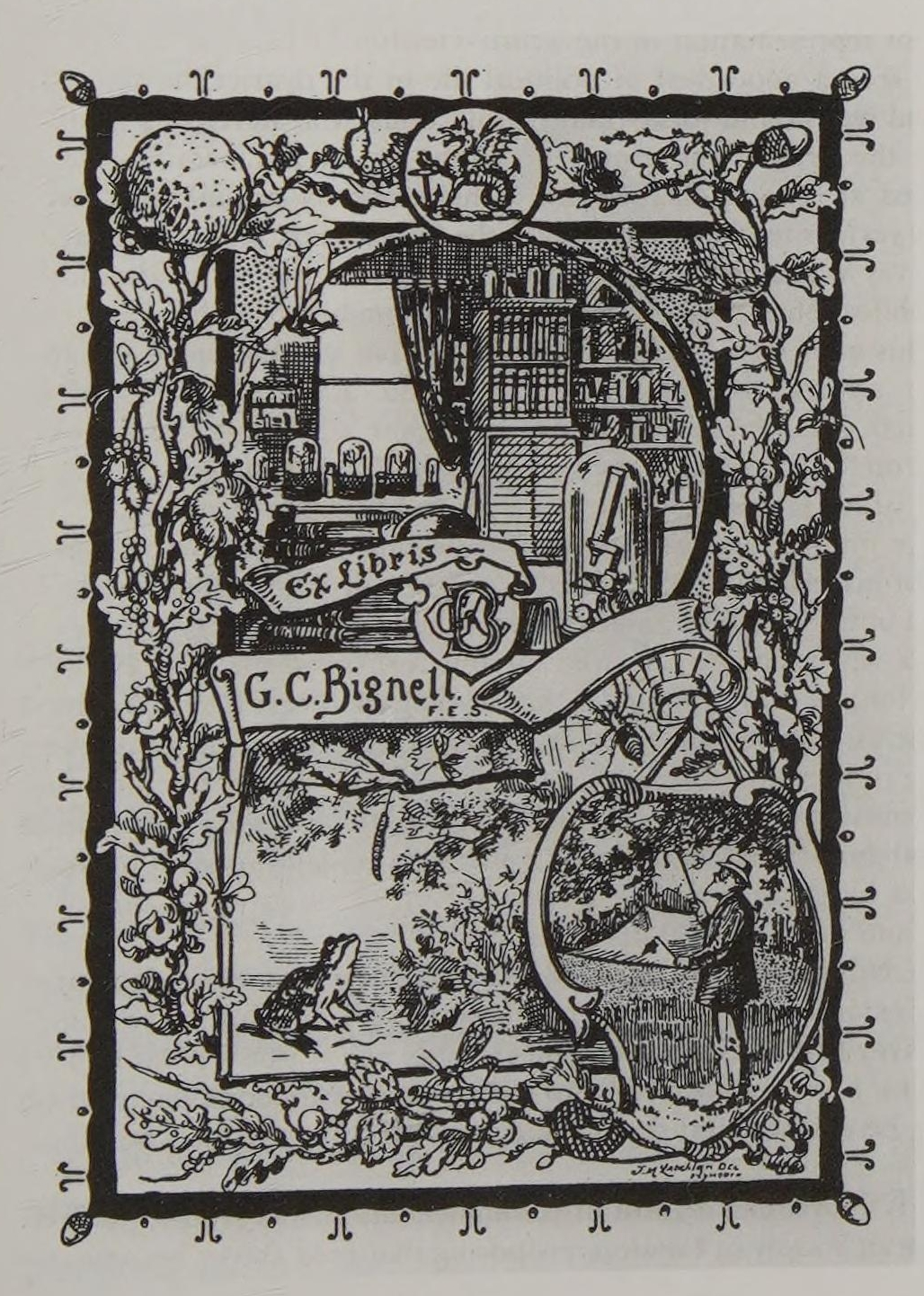
Bignell's bookplate designed by J. M. Lauchton

Bignell was born in Exeter and left school at the age of 12 to become a bookings clerk but joined the Royal Marines when he was 16. He joined HMS Superb, one of the last all-wooden, all-sailing, ships-of-the-line to serve in the Royal Navy. He saw action in the Portuguese "Little Civil War" in 1847, as part of a British squadron sent to support Queen Maria II. During his time in the Marines he developed a passion for natural history, especially insects, which he studied whenever he had the chance. He retired after 22 years' service with the rank of Barrack Sergeant.

Bignell was then appointed Registrar of Births and Deaths, and Poor Law Officer for Stonehouse in Plymouth, Devon. His spare time was devoted to entomology; he scoured the countryside of Devon and Cornwall looking for specimens and studying them in their habitat. Although he studied and collected a wide range of insects, it was his work with the Ichneumonidae or parasitic wasps that was outstanding; discovering nineteen species that were entirely new to science, two of which are named after him. These include Mesoleius bignellii, Apanteles bignellii (now Cotesia), and Iphiaulax (now Atanycolus) bignelli. He devised the Bignell Beating Tray, a folding screen for collecting insects falling from a beaten branch. Bignell knew other collectors of the period including James Higman Keys (1855-1941) and exchanged specimens with Claude Morley. In addition to insects, he later researched and collected marine algae.

Bignell was a member of the Plymouth Athenaeum and the Plymouth Institution, of which he became president in 1893, and a Fellow of the Royal Entomological Society of London (from 1880). He wrote many articles for The Entomologist Magazine, the Young Naturalist and the Transactions of the Plymouth Institution. A large collection of his specimens is held at the Plymouth Museum and some are at the Natural History Museum in London.

His first two wives predeceased him and he married for a third time in 1874. In 1898, he moved from Stonehouse to Saltash in Cornwall. Bignell died on his 84th birthday in 1910. He was survived by three daughters and his widow, while a son had died at sea before him.
