= Sweep net =

Net for catching insects

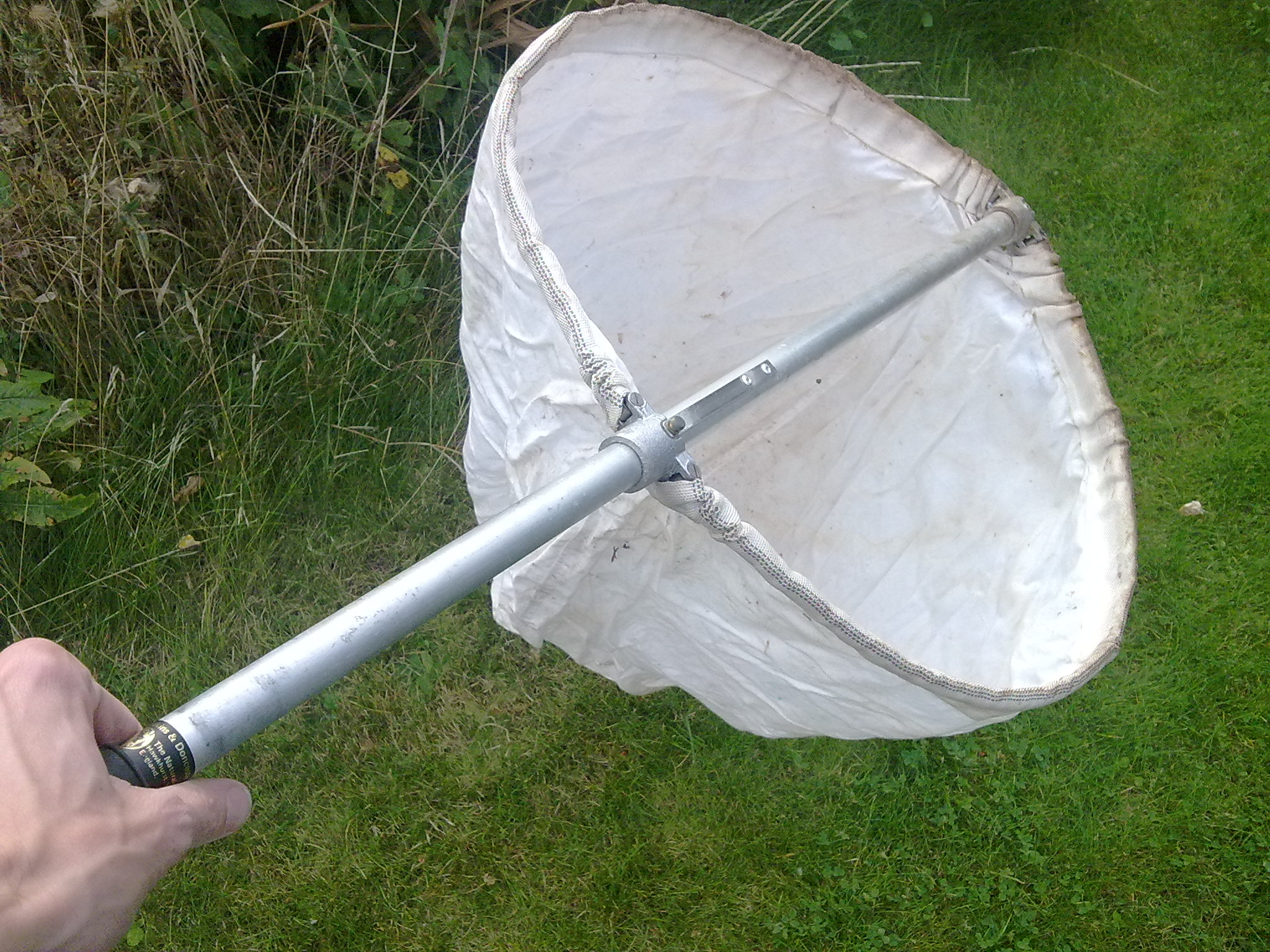
A sweep net

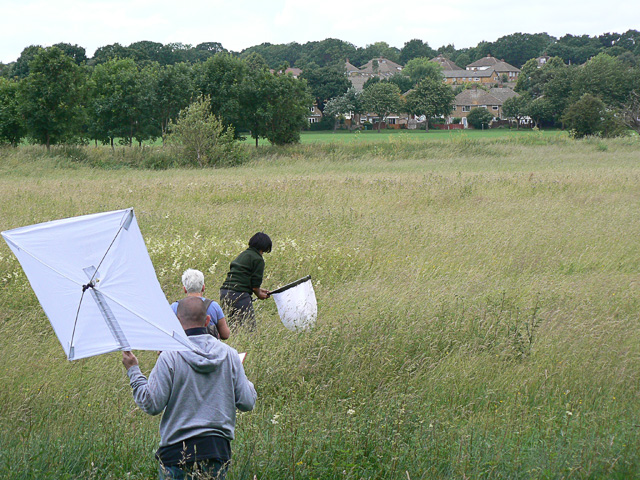
Catching insects with a sweep net

A sweep net is a rugged form of a butterfly net, used to collect insects from grass and brush. A sweep net is swept back and forth through vegetation, quickly turning the opening from side to side and following a shallow figure eight pattern. The collector walks forward while sweeping, and the net is moved through plants and grasses with force. Sweeping continues for some distance and then the net is flipped over, with the bag hanging over the rim, trapping the insects until they can be removed.
