= Insect collecting =

Hobby

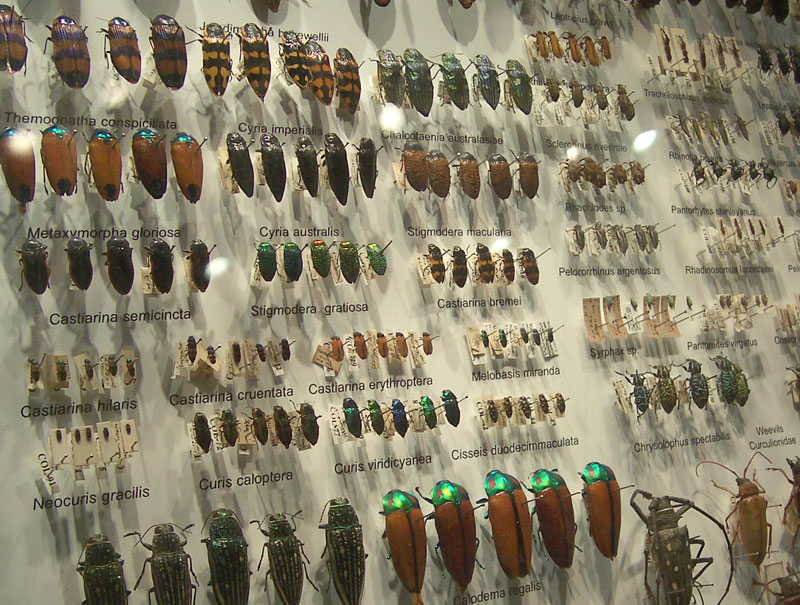
Beetle collection at the Melbourne Museum, Australia

Insect collecting refers to the collection of insects and other arthropods for scientific study or as a hobby. Most insects are small and the majority cannot be identified without the examination of minute morphological characters, so entomologists often make and maintain insect collections. Very large collections are preserved in natural history museums or universities where they are maintained and studied by specialists. Many college courses require students to form small collections. There are also amateur entomologists and collectors who keep collections.

Historically, insect collecting has been widespread and was in the Victorian age a very popular educational hobby. Insect collecting has left traces in European cultural history, literature and songs, e.g., Georges Brassens's La chasse aux papillons (The Hunt for Butterflies). The practice is particularly common among Japanese youths.

== Capture and kill techniques ==
=== Traps ===
Pitfall traps are a common method for capturing terrestrial arthropods. They can be placed in specific areas to capture insects known to frequent that particular habitat. The efficiency of pitfall traps is dependent on the size of the opening of the trap and, if multiple traps are used, the spacial arrangement of the traps. Pitfall traps can be an advantageous method of collecting insects because it does not usually kill the specimens it catches and it can hold multiple insects at a time. Furthermore, they are cheap and easy to assemble.

There are two types of insect light traps: the box type and the funnel type. Although funnel type traps were originally invented to specifically catch moths, they are now used to capture other insects. According to researchers from Imperial College London, insects go towards artificial light because they mistake the light for the sky and instinctually fly towards it. The efficacy of light traps is impacted by factors including the size of the bulb and the time of day that the trap is used. UV bulbs and LEDs are more effective than incandescent bulbs, which emit infrared lights that are invisible to most nocturnal insects. The wavelength produced by the bulbs is also significant: research conducted in Egypt found that the use of blue and green LEDs attracted only approximately one-fifth of the number of sand flies that red LEDs did. Edward Ricciuti, writing for Entomology Today, described light traps as the best method for easily catching insects and for collecting many samples in a short period of time. A disadvantage of light traps is that they are limited to only capturing nocturnal species. They can also be ineffective if there is another light source present such as the moon.

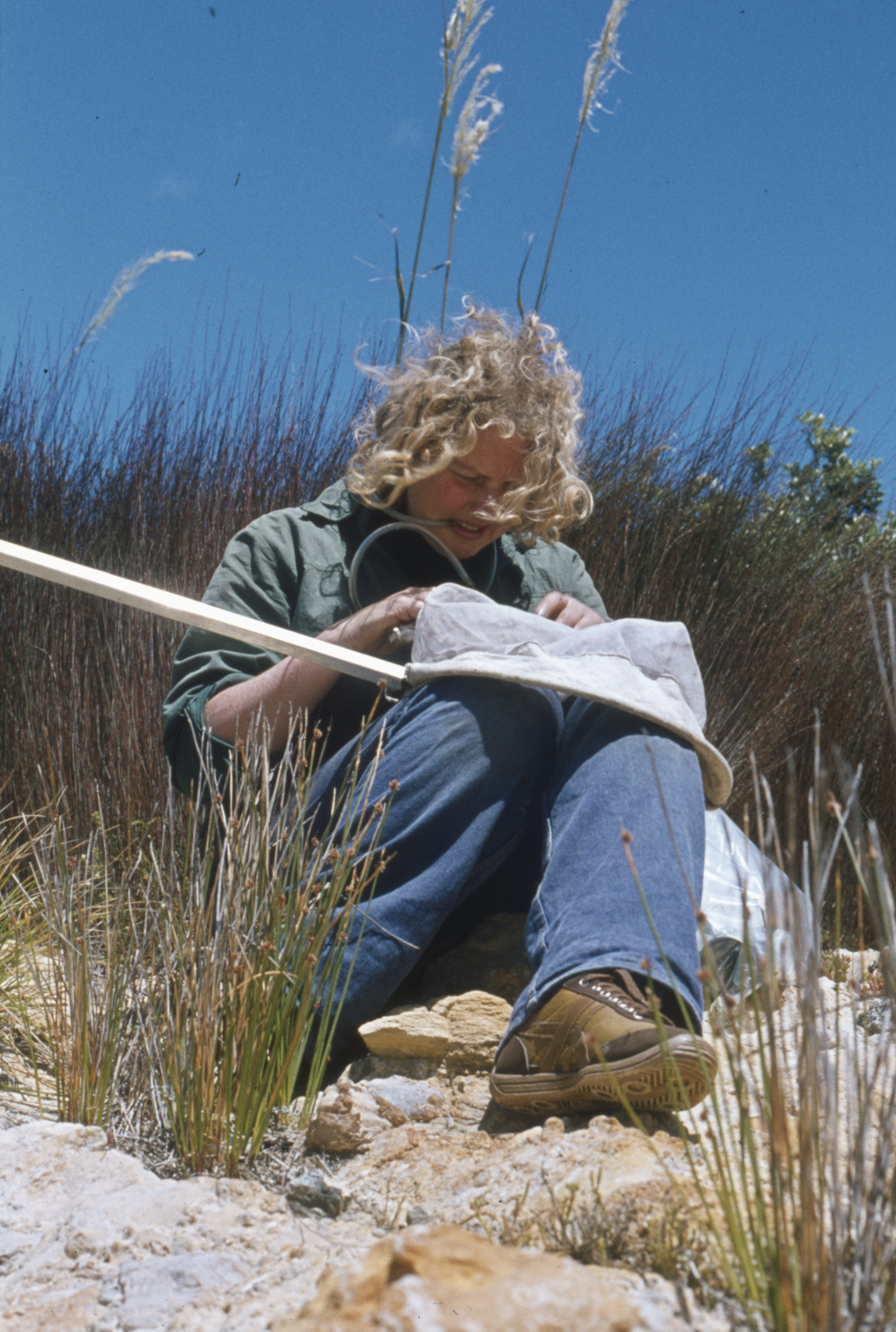
Entomologist Clare Butcher collecting with a net and an aspirator.

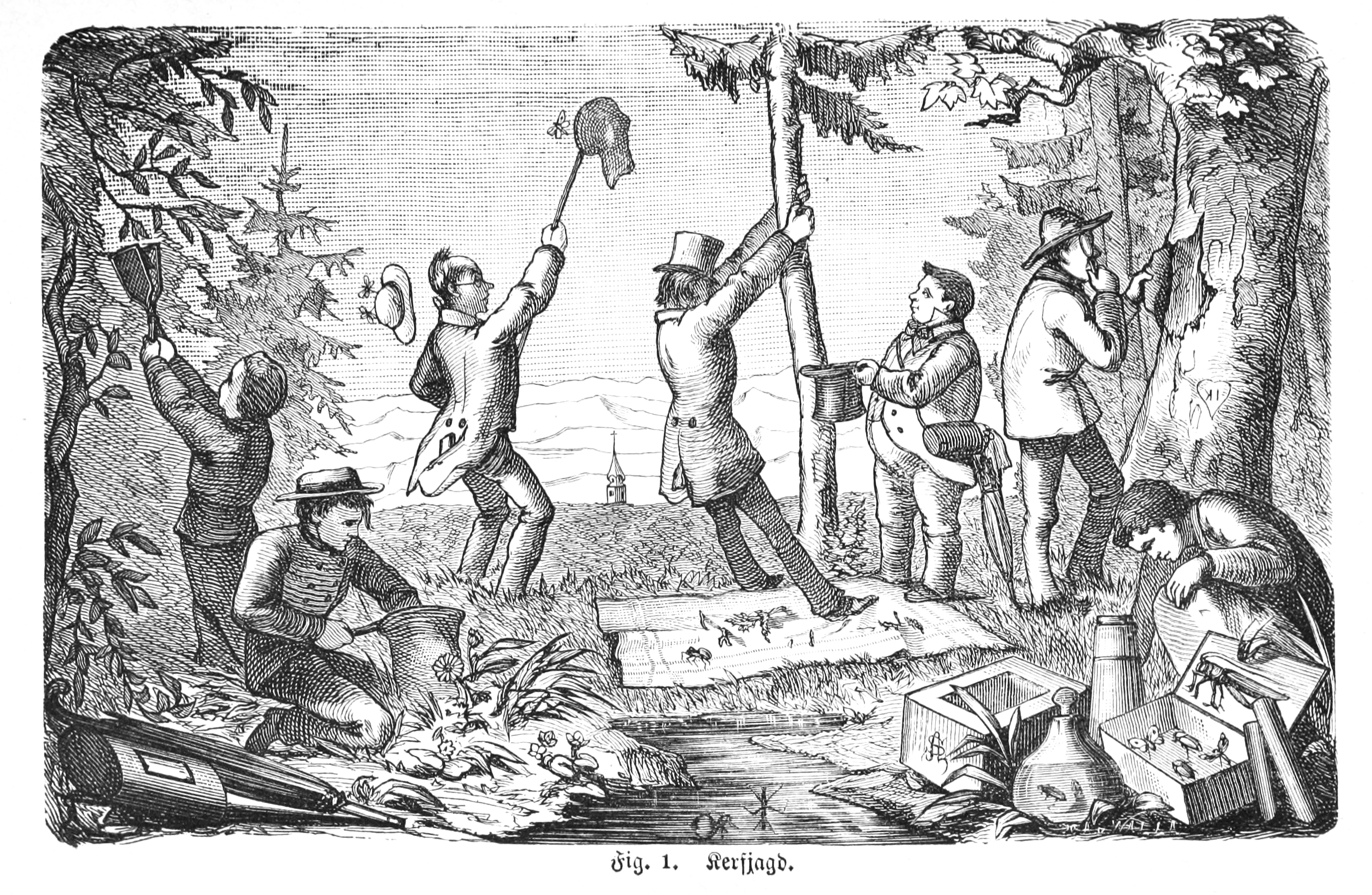
1877 illustration showing a variety of collection techniques

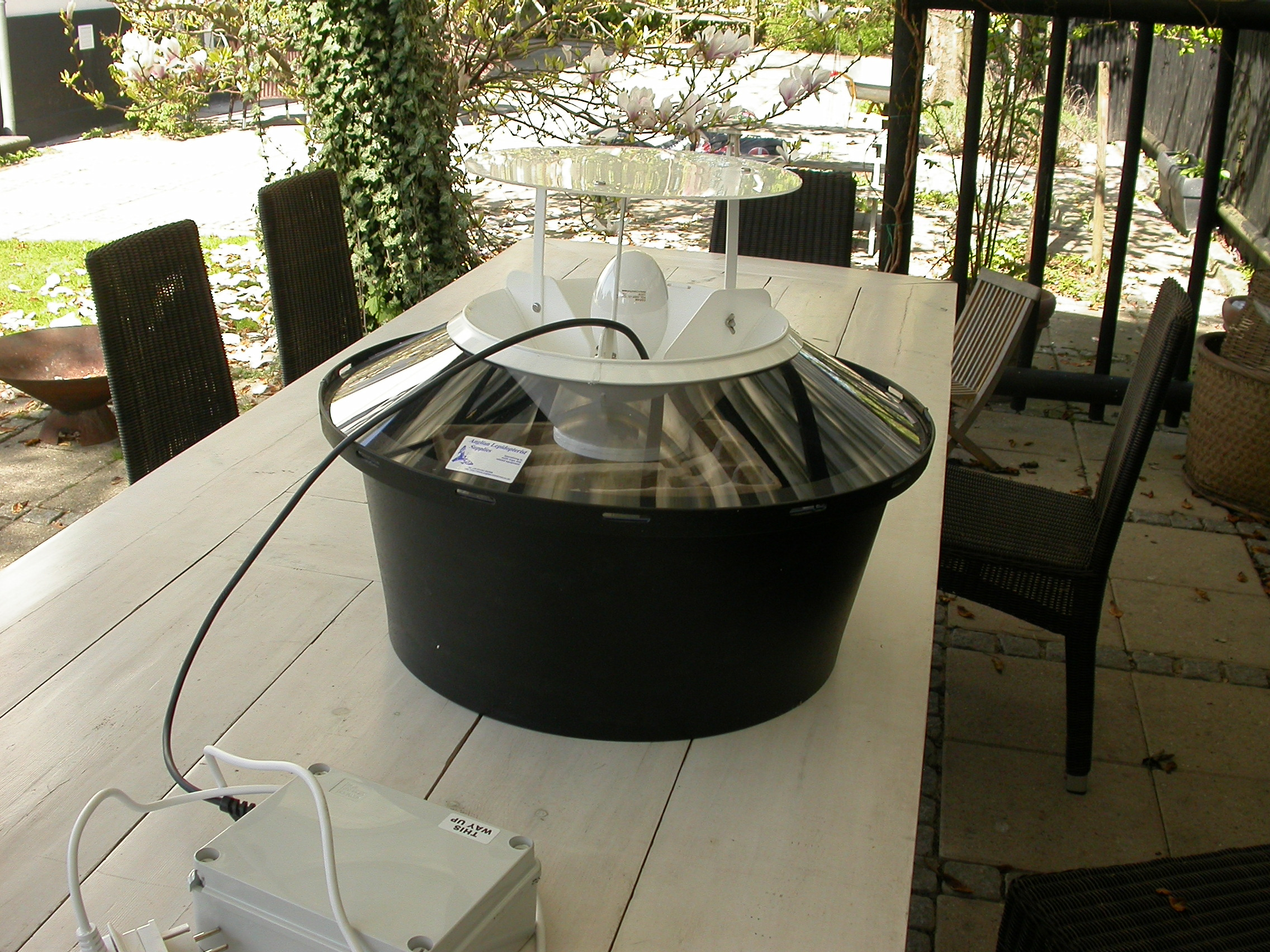
A Robinson light trap for collecting moths

Aspirators, sometimes called "pooters", suck up insects too small or delicate to handle with fingers.

=== Nets ===
Active capture of insects often involves using nets. Aerial insect nets are used to collect flying insects. The bag of a butterfly net is generally constructed from a lightweight mesh to minimize damage to delicate butterfly wings. Sweep nets are more rugged, and used to collect insects from grass and brush. A sweep net is swept back and forth through vegetation quickly turning the opening from side to side and following a shallow figure eight pattern. The collector walks forward while sweeping, and the net is moved through plants and grasses with force. Sweeping continues for some distance and then the net is flipped over, with the bag hanging over the rim, trapping the insects until they can be removed. Other types of nets used for collecting insects include beating nets and aquatic nets. Leaf litter sieves are used by coleopterists to collect larvae.

Once collected, insects must be killed before they damage themselves trying to escape. Killing jars are used on hard-bodied insects. Soft-bodied insects, such as those in the larval stage, are generally fixed in a vial containing an ethanol and water solution.

== Storage and curation ==
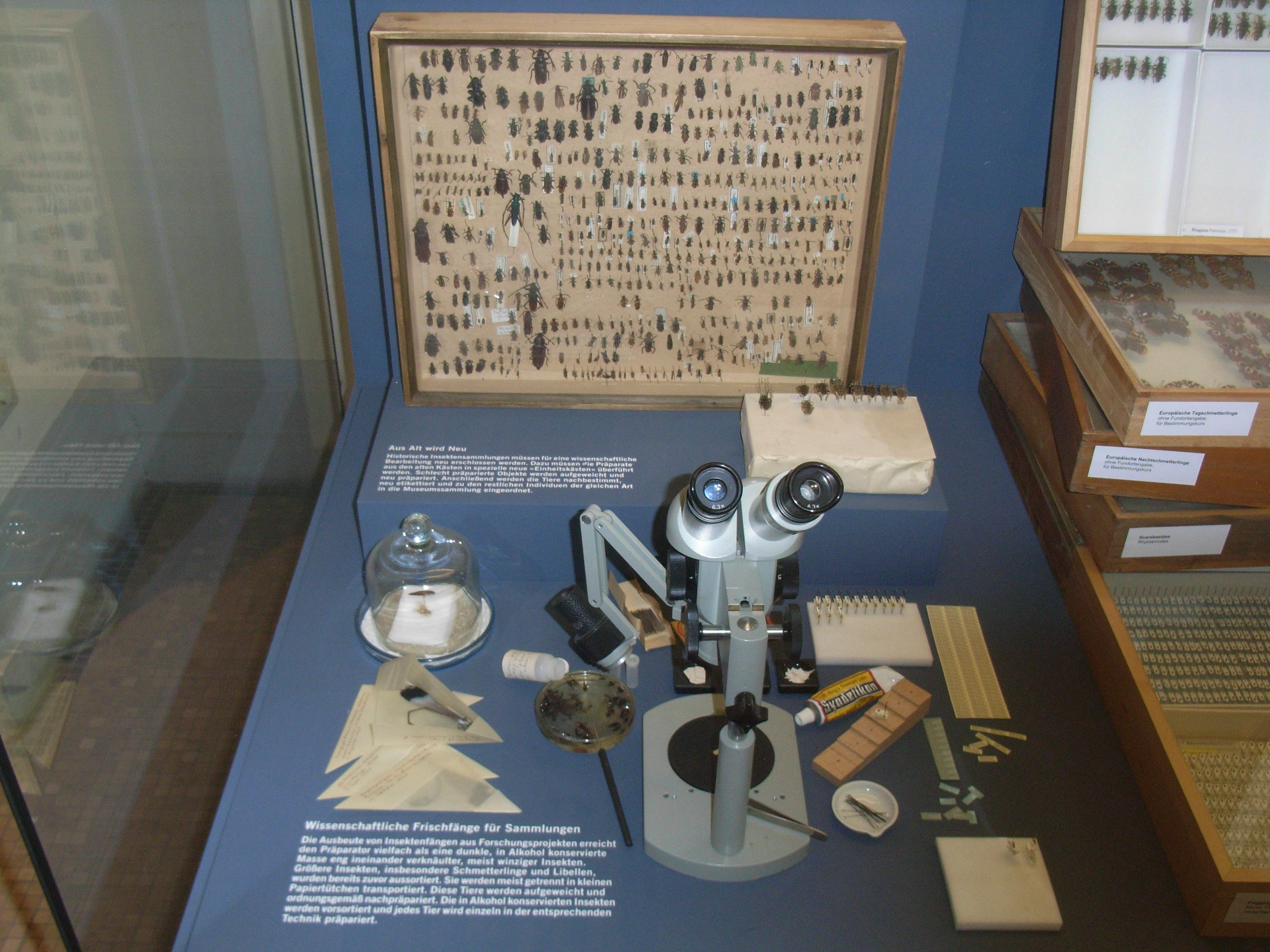
Equipment for preparation

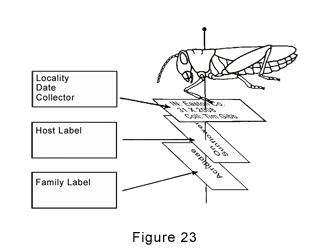
Insect pinning label order diagram

There are several different preservation methods that are used; some of which include: dried preservation (pinning), liquid preservation, or slide mounts. Another (now mostly historical) approach is caterpillar inflation, where the innards were removed and the skin dried. Pinning is by far the most common form of insect preservation.

It is better to pin an insect that has died recently enough that it has not dried yet, because it allows the thoracic muscles to adhere to the pin. Previously dried specimens must have glue applied to the pin location to avoid spinning. The large majority of the time insects are pinned vertically through their mesothorax and slightly off-center to the right of the mid-line. The pin should sit with 1/4 of the pin above the insect as to allow enough room for labels to be readable underneath.

When pinning insects with wings, it is important to display them properly: Lepidoptera wings should always be spread. When drying insects with wings such as butterflies, setting paper is used to position the wings.

Orthopteroids often have their left wings spread. In scientific collections, the insect's wings, legs, and antennae are tucked underneath it to conserve space.

When point-mounting small insects the insect is glued to a small piece of non acidic, triangle paper. When drying an insect the relaxed insect is spread out accordingly using pins on a foam block where it can dry and retain its positioning.

When labeling insects the labels are presented in this order top down: Locality, additional locality/voucher label/accession numbers, insect identification.

== Insect pins ==
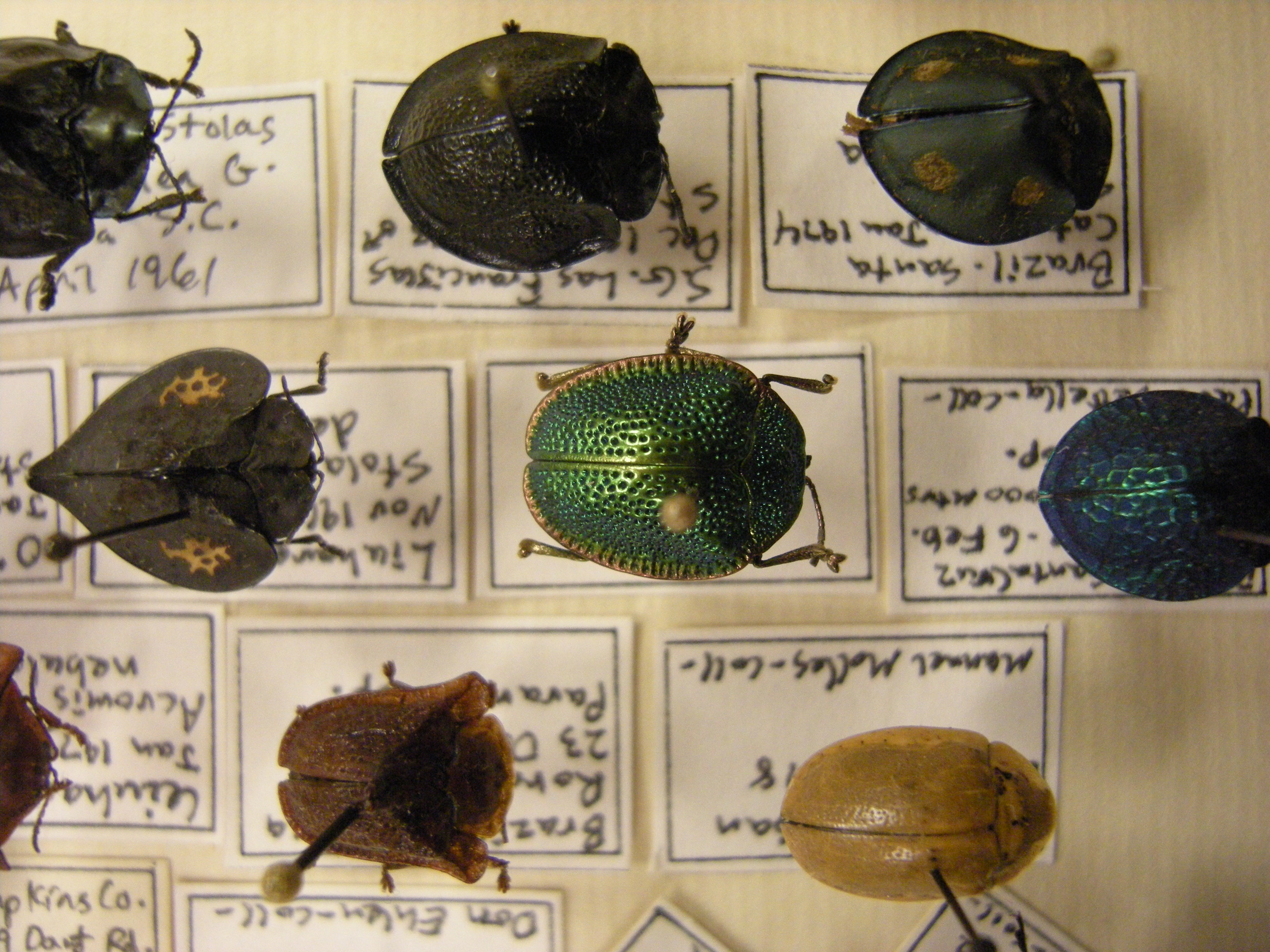
Part of a beetle collection. The insects are fixed in place by entomological pins which allow handling and which also pierce the data label

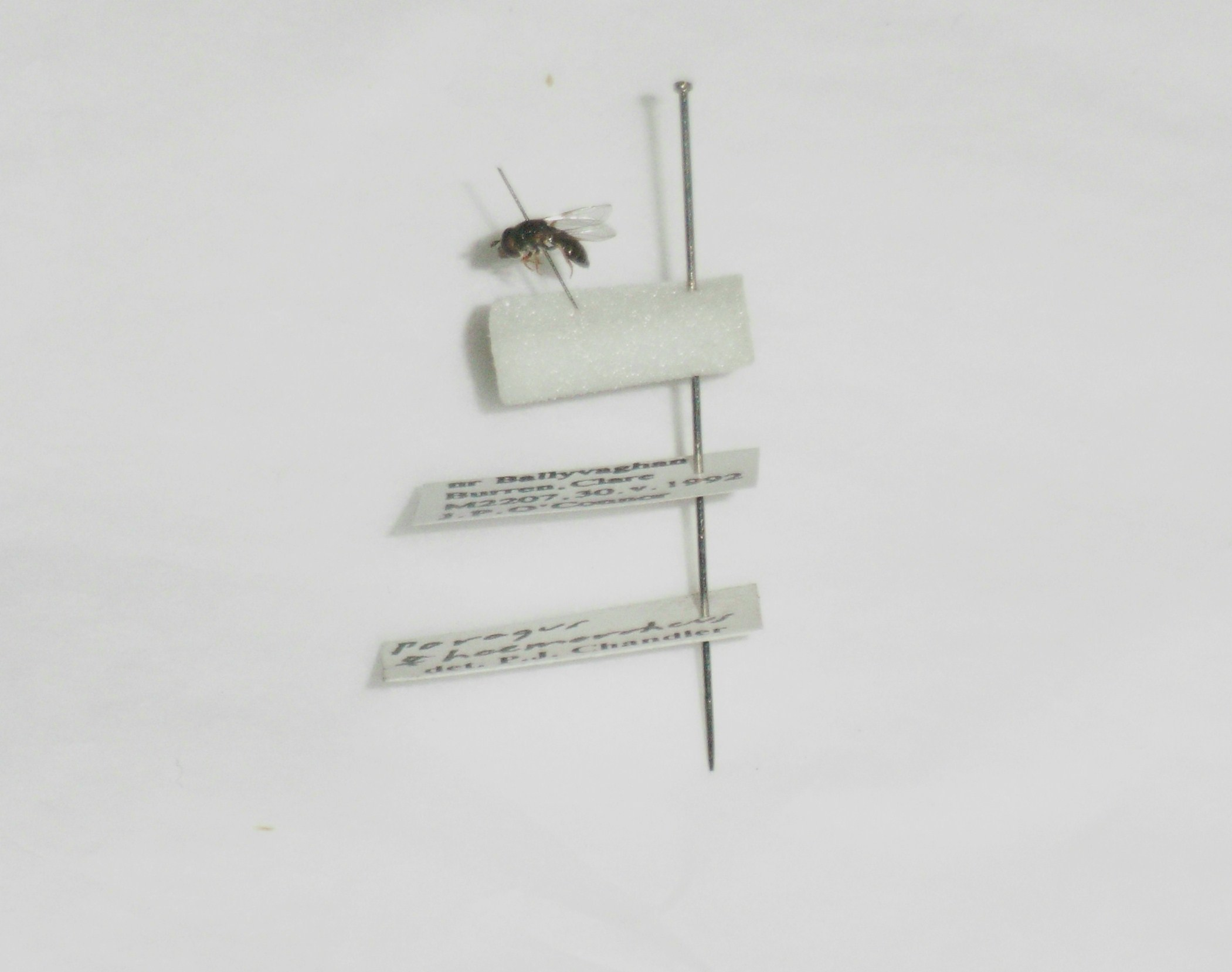
A hoverfly double-mounted with a minuten pin and a size 3 pin

Insect pins are used by entomologists for mounting insect specimens.

As standard, they are 38 millimetres (1.5 in) long and come in sizes from 000 (the smallest diameter), through 00, 0, and 1, to 8 (the largest diameter). The most generally useful size in entomology is size 2, which is 0.46 millimetres (0.018 in) in diameter, with sizes 1 and 3 being the next most useful.

They were once commonly made from brass or silver, but these would corrode from contact with insect bodies and are no longer commonly used. Instead they are nickel-plated brass, yielding "white" or "black" enamelling, or even made from stainless steel. Similarly, the smallest sizes from 000 to 1 used to be impractical for mounting until plastic and polyethylene became commonly used for pinning bases.

There are also micropins, which are 10–15 millimetres (0.39–0.59 in) long. minutens are headless micropins that are generally only made of stainless steel, used for double-mounting, where the insect is mounted on the minuten, which is pinned to a small block of soft material, which is in turn mounted on a standard, larger, insect pin.

=== Pinning of entomological specimens ===
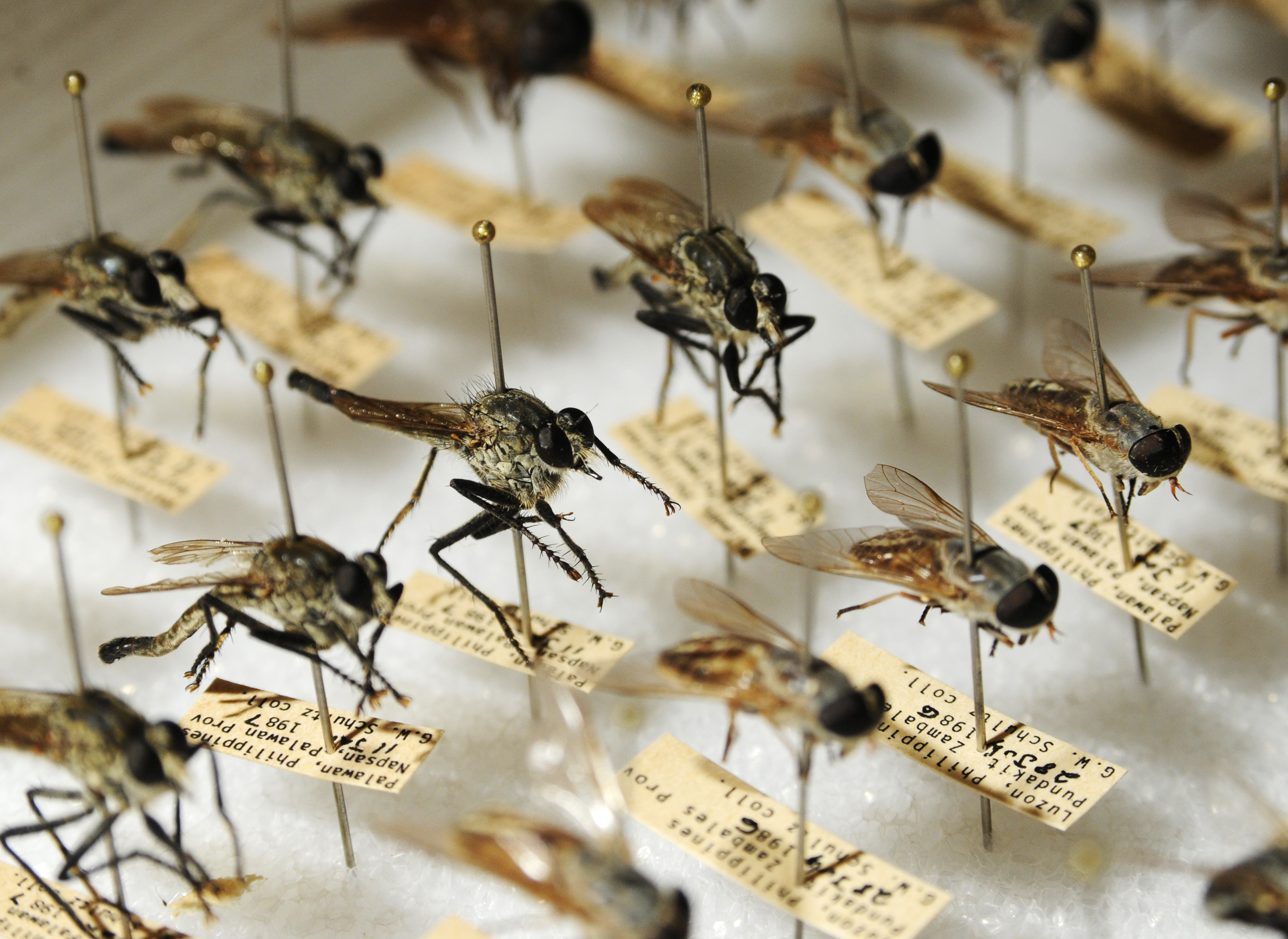
Directly-pinned Diptera. Though most of these specimens are at the correct height, some have been pinned incorrectly by placing the pin on the centre line, damaging characters on both sides of the thorax.

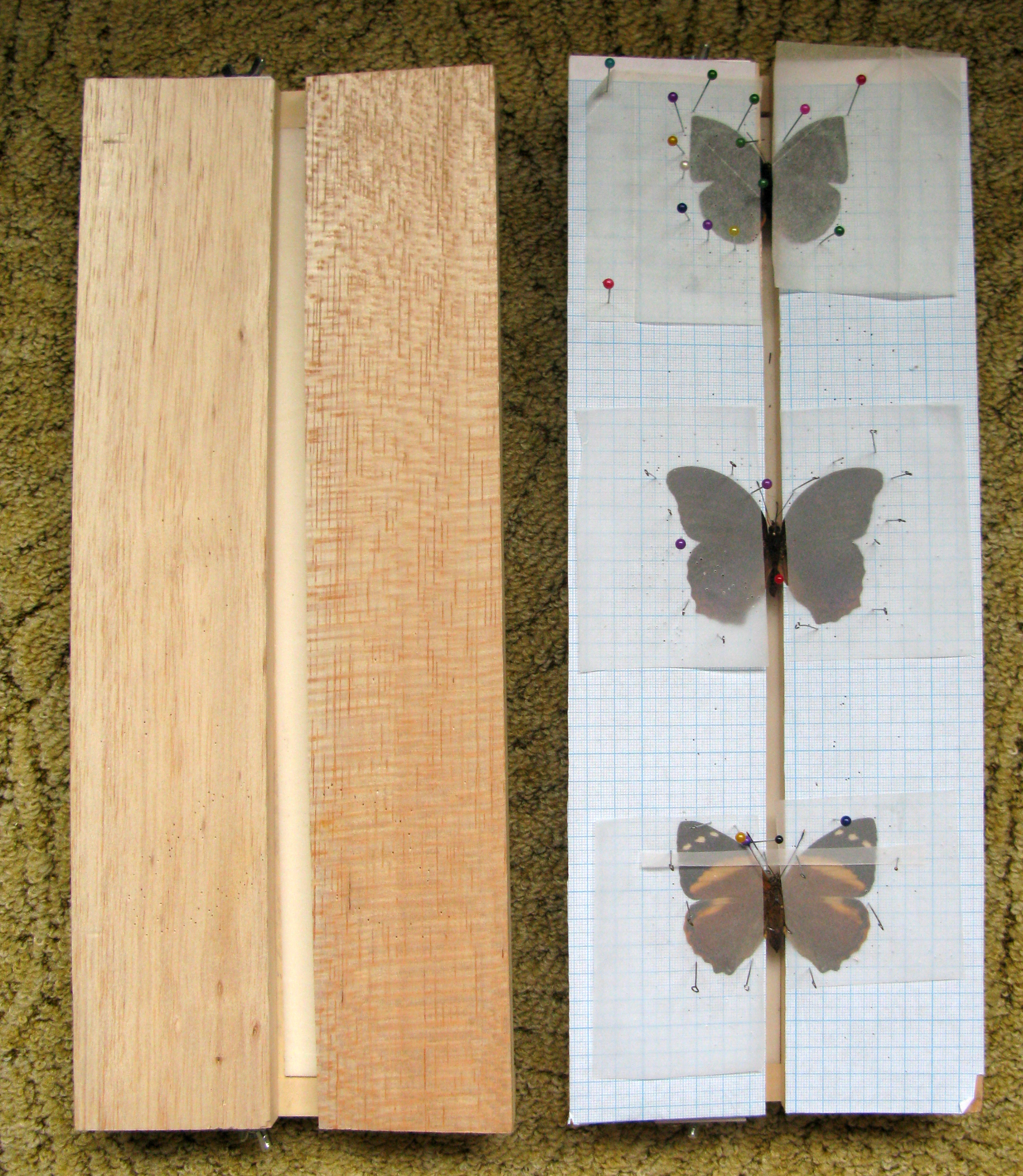
Setting boards

- Entomological pins. Continental pins, so called for historical reasons, are used internationally by museums and collectors. They are made of stainless steel for preference, especially for very long-term storage of specimens, but blackened steel also is used. The pins have round plastic or solid metal heads. Continental pins are of a standard length (40mm), but they are available in thicknesses numbered 000 (the thinnest), 00, 0, 1, 2, 3, 4, 5, and 6 (the thickest). This standard pin length is sufficient to accommodate an adequate number of data labels and to permit convenient handling with suitably curved forceps or tweezers, referred to as 'entomological forceps'.

As an exception to this standard, there also are pins of size 7, extra-long and very strong pins for very large beetles; they are 52mm long and thicker than size 6 pins.

- Direct pinning. Direct pinning is the insertion of an entomological pin directly through the thorax of a specimen. The insects are pinned vertically through the thorax with a suitably sized pin, but by convention they are not pinned on the midline, but to the right, so as to leave at least one side undamaged.
- Point. A point is a triangular piece of white card. Specially designed point punches permit the production of large numbers of points of standard sizes as required. To use a point, a pin is inserted through the broad base of the triangle. To mount the specimen, a tiny amount of glue is placed on the tip and applied to the right side of the insect's thorax. If appropriate the tip of the point may be bent at the necessary angle to hold the body of the specimen horizontal when the pin is vertical, with the long axis of the insect at right angles to the point.

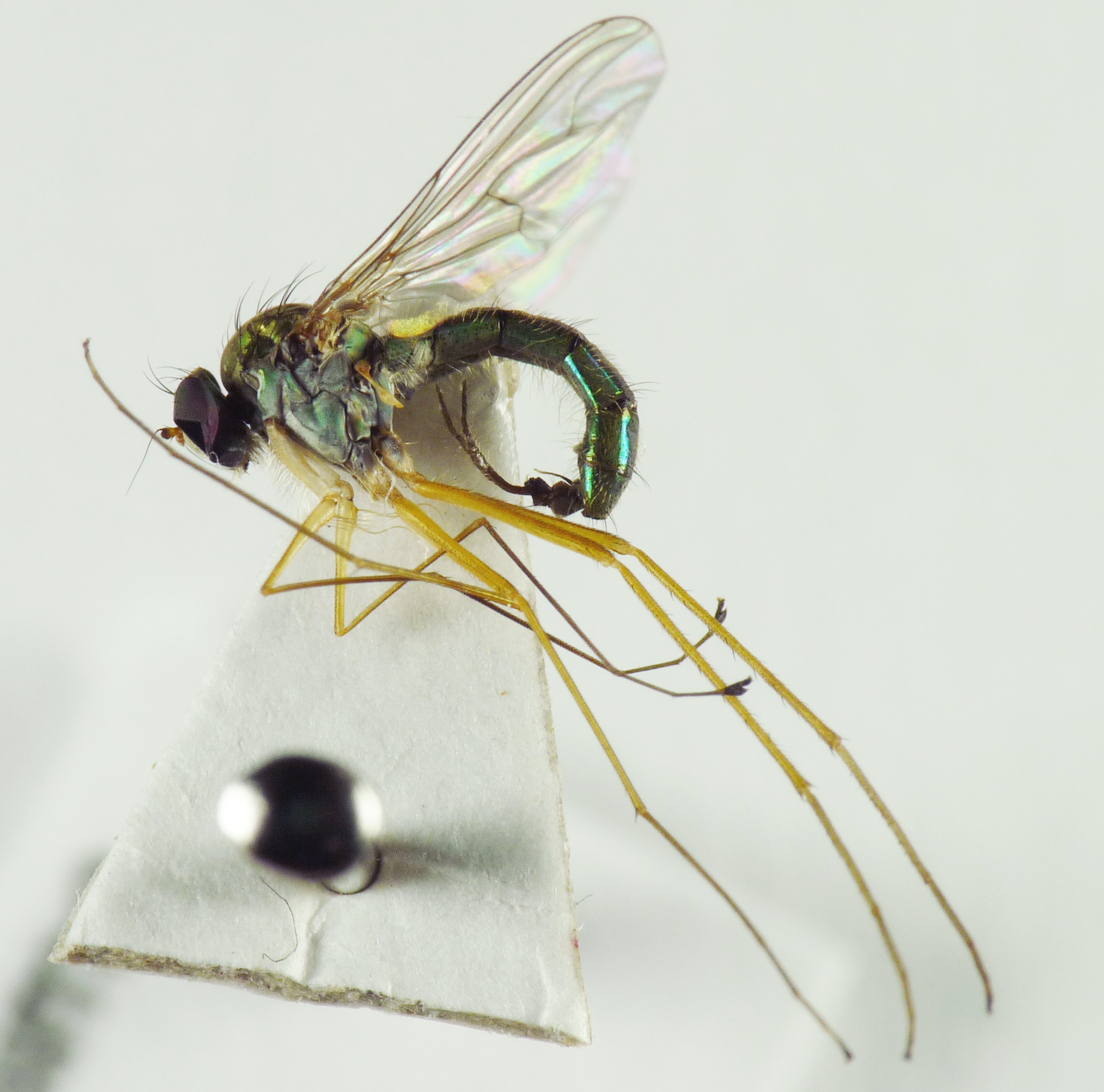
Sciapus nervosus glued to a card point

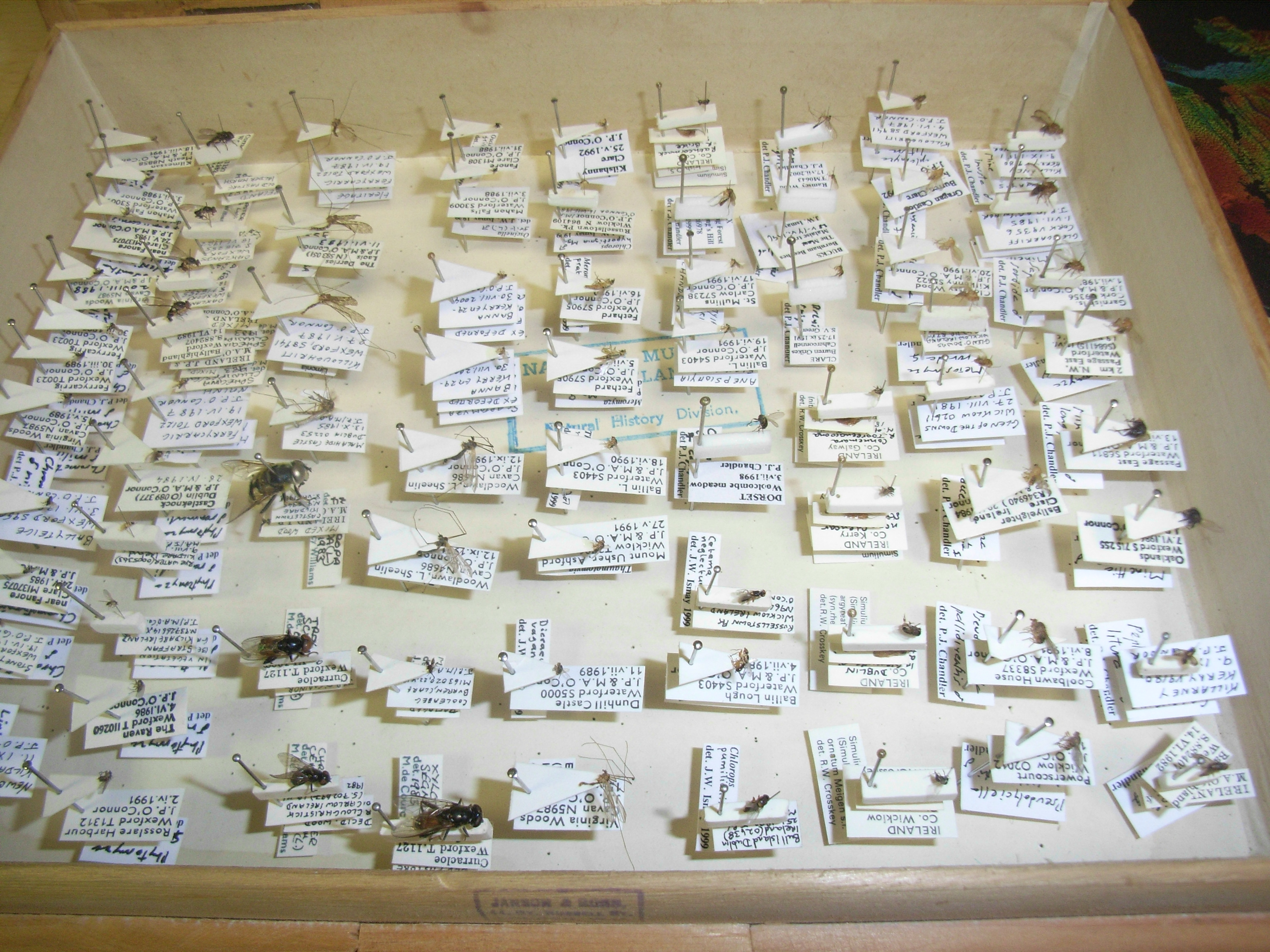
Diptera mounted on card points

- Minuten pins. Insect pins without heads, 12mm long. They are used for double mounting (staging) very small insects. They also may be used profitably for staging insects of moderate size, where they have the advantage of being less damaging to the specimen. For best effect in that respect, the pin is inserted from below through the staging card, well into the thorax, but not all the way through. Alternatively the minuten pin can be inserted laterally into one side of the thorax, again preferably not all the way through.
- Carding. Insects (especially Coleoptera and Hemiptera) are glued to rectangular pieces of acid free card or Bristol board providing a stage. Typical sizes are 4.5 x 11 mm;5 x 14 mm;6 x 17 mm;10 x 21 mm;13 x 30 mm. Printed lines allow uniform placement of the entomological pin. Though this is convenient, it is dubious practice at best, because it obscures features that might be necessary for taxonomic or morphological studies. In any case, at the very least the glue should be sufficiently conveniently soluble to be removed with solvents when necessary. With such considerations in mind, Canada balsam is about as good an adhesive as any.

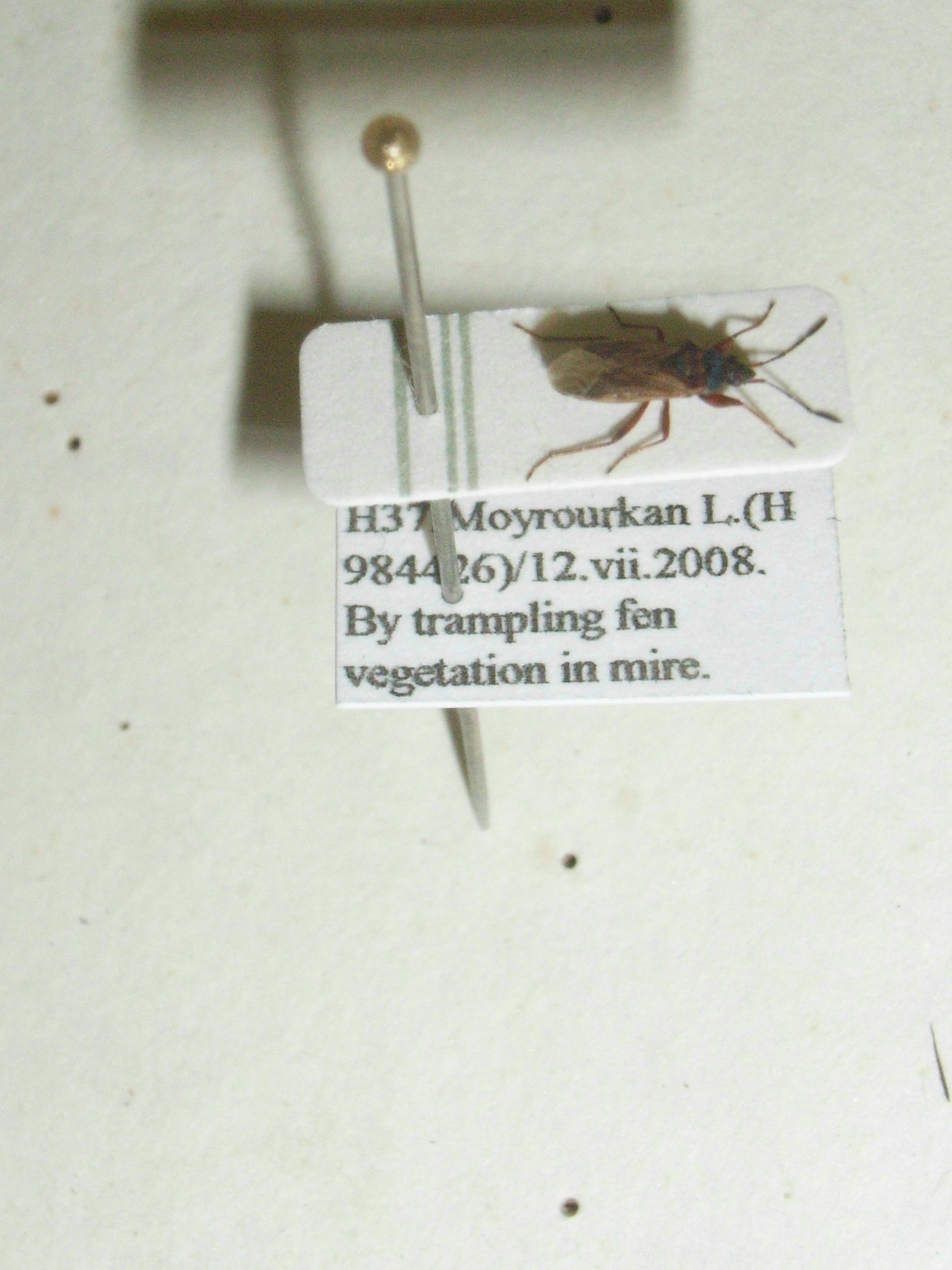
A carded bug

- Staging. When specimens are mounted on a smaller support which in turn is supported on a normal full-sized entomological pin, this is called staging. For example a specimen might be mounted on a minuten pin, typically being pinned on its side (lateral pinning) or upright (direct pinning) with the minuten pin driven into a stage, a strip of suitable material such as dried plant pith or plastic foam supported in a horizontal position on the main entomological pin; as a rule a number 3 pin is convenient. Other forms of stage include card mounts and point mounts.

The stage usually is positioned at such a distance up the vertical stage-pin, as to put the specimen at the same height as a directly pinned insect; this normally allows room for labels beneath and to allow handling of the specimen without damage.
If insects are side-pinned by pins that pass right through the specimens, then the minuten should be at such an angle that different features are damaged on the opposite sides of the thorax. Competent staging protects small specimens and displays most features conveniently. The stage-pin then is easy to manipulate when moving the specimen and the stage absorbs vibrations.

== History ==
Insect collecting was popular in Victorian Britain. As travel options improved during this era (such as with the expansion of the railway network), insect collecting was better facilitated. Collectors reported to entomological magazines that they could collect hundreds of butterfly specimens in a single day. It was a hobby enjoyed by both children and adults. One prominent figure who enjoyed insect collecting was Charles Darwin, who was introduced to the hobby by his cousin William Darwin Fox. Darwin was well-known by his classmates at the University of Cambridge for his passion for insect collecting. He wrote, "It was the mere passion for collecting; for I did not dissect them, and rarely compared with their external characters with published descriptions, but got them named anyhow. Two boxes of Darwin's early collections of British beetles survive: one is held by the University Museum of Zoology, and one is held at Down House.

Victorians also collected insects so they could be used in fashion. For example, women wore fireflies in their hair and pinned beetles to their bodices, and, in 1863, Godey's Lady's Book praised the designs of Madame Tilman of Paris, who incorporated real insect specimens into her clothing pieces. When one Englishwoman travelled to Brazil, she reported her astonishment at seeing living insects which she had only previously seen in jewellery. Amelia Sloth has connected the Victorian interest in insect collecting to colonialism: to meet the demand for insect jewellery, the labour of enslaved people was used. This demand also expedited the extinction of some species of insects.

== In popular culture ==
Insect collecting inspired the video game franchise Pokémon, in which the player catches animal characters, some of which are inspired by insects. As a child, the creator of Pokémon, Satoshi Tajiri, enjoyed collecting insects from the fields surrounding Tokyo and would index his collection in a notebook. Tajiri was so passionate about insect collecting that his classmates reportedly nicknamed him "Mr. Bug".

== See also ==
- Identification key
- Killing jar
- Timeline of entomology
