= Beating net =

Device for catching insects

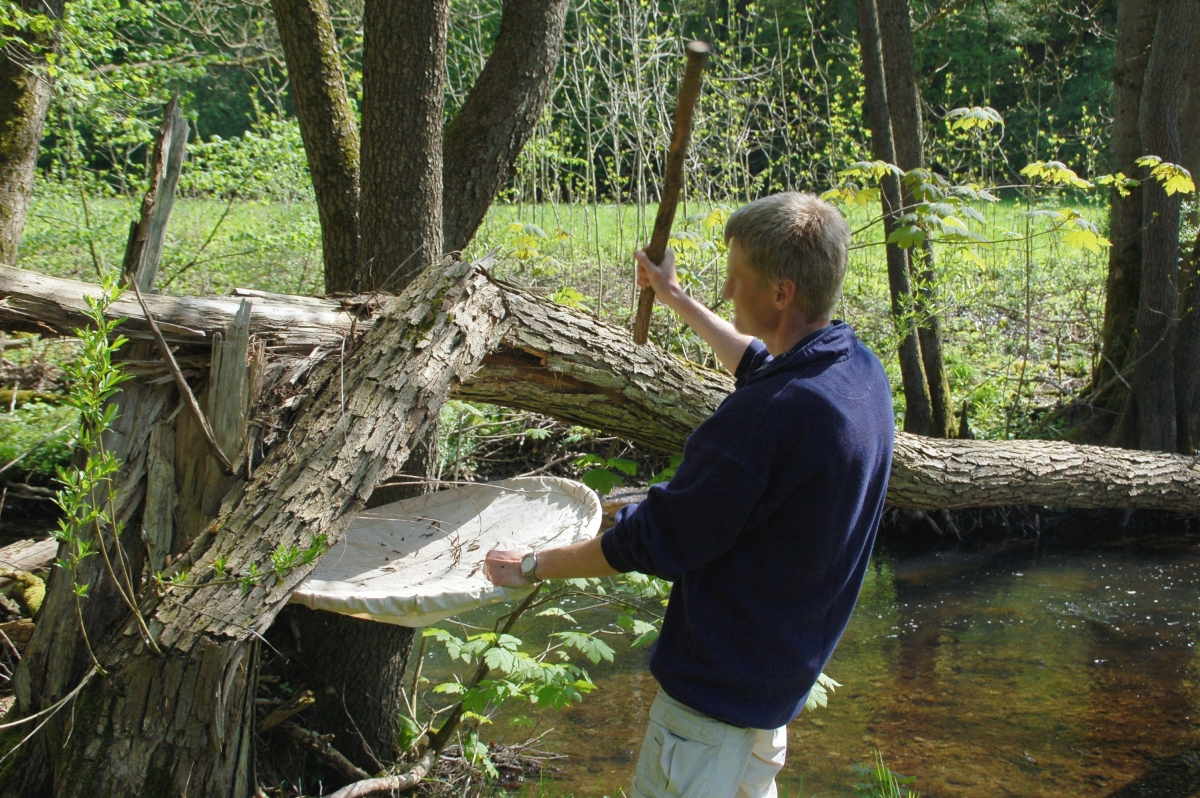
Beating insects from a tree branch

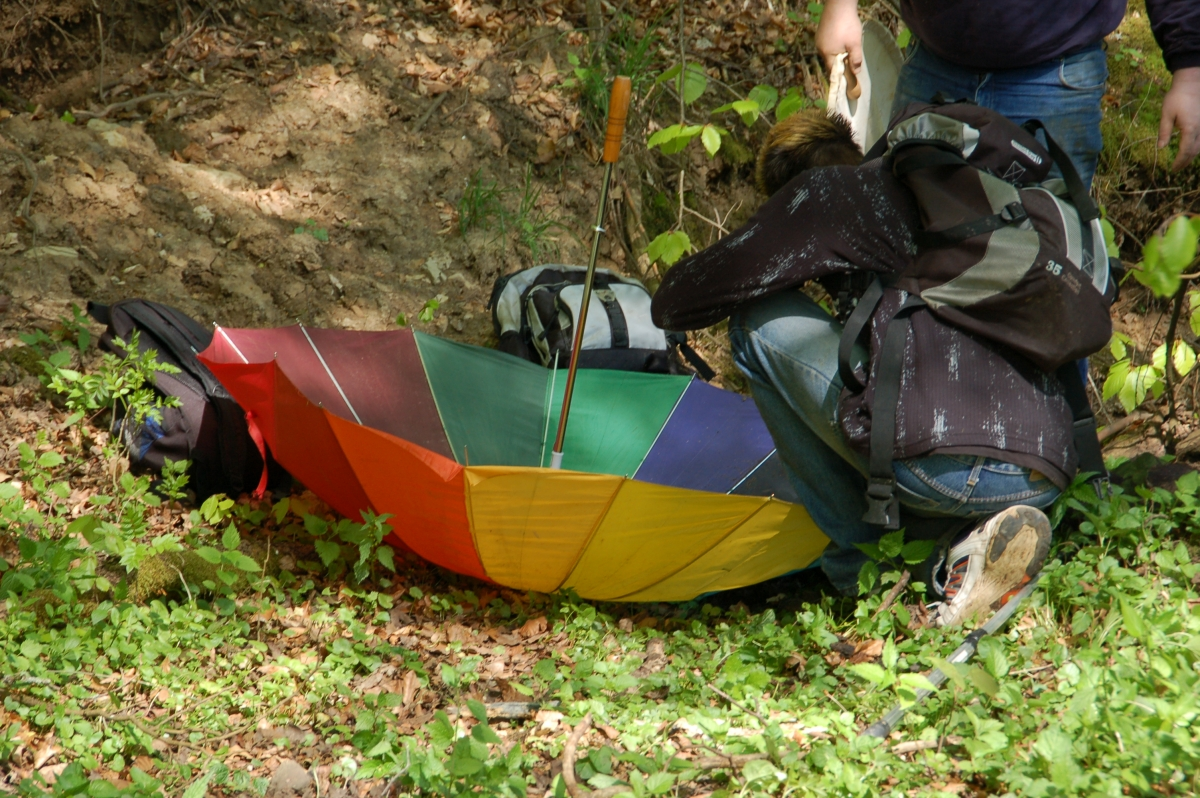
Using an umbrella as a beating net

A beating net is a device used to collect insects and arachnids. It mainly collects caterpillars, spiders, beetles, aphids and flies. The beating net consists of a white cloth stretched out on a circular or rectangular frame which may be dismantled for transport. It is held under a tree or shrub and then the foliage is shaken or beaten with a stick. Insects fall from the plant and land on the cloth. They can then be examined or collected using a pooter.

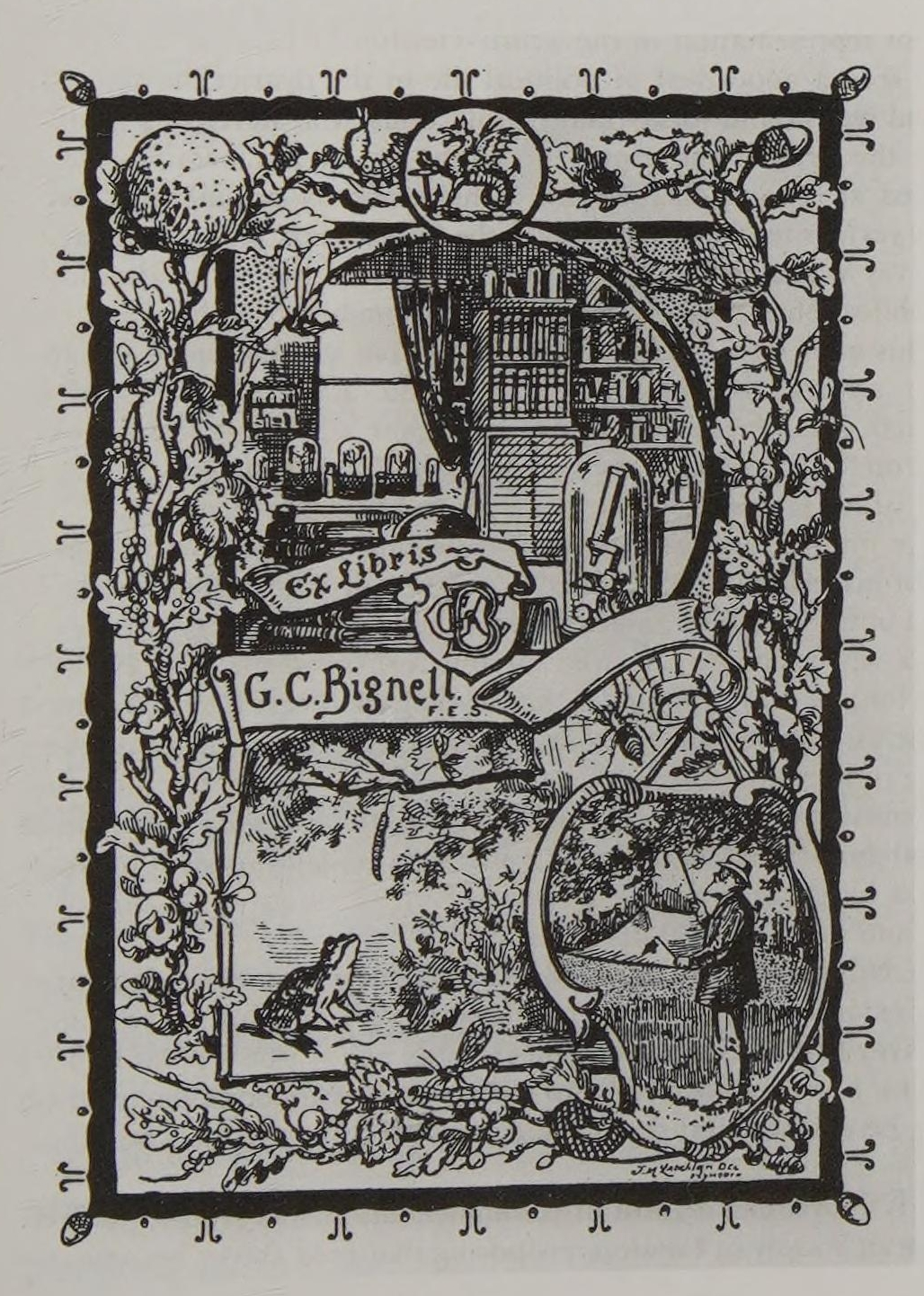
Bookplate of George Carter Bignell with his beating tray, displayed in the bottom right hand corner

The beating net is also known as the beating tray or beating sheet. It is commercially known as a Japanese umbrella, mainly in Europe. It can also be confused for a beat sheet, an agricultural device of a similar name. A beat sheet is a white or yellow cloth draped over crop rows to capture insects.

The insect beating net was devised by George Carter Bignell. Use of the beating net replaced the use of the entomological umbrella and the clap-net.
