= Killing jar =

Jar used to kill insects so they can be used as specimens

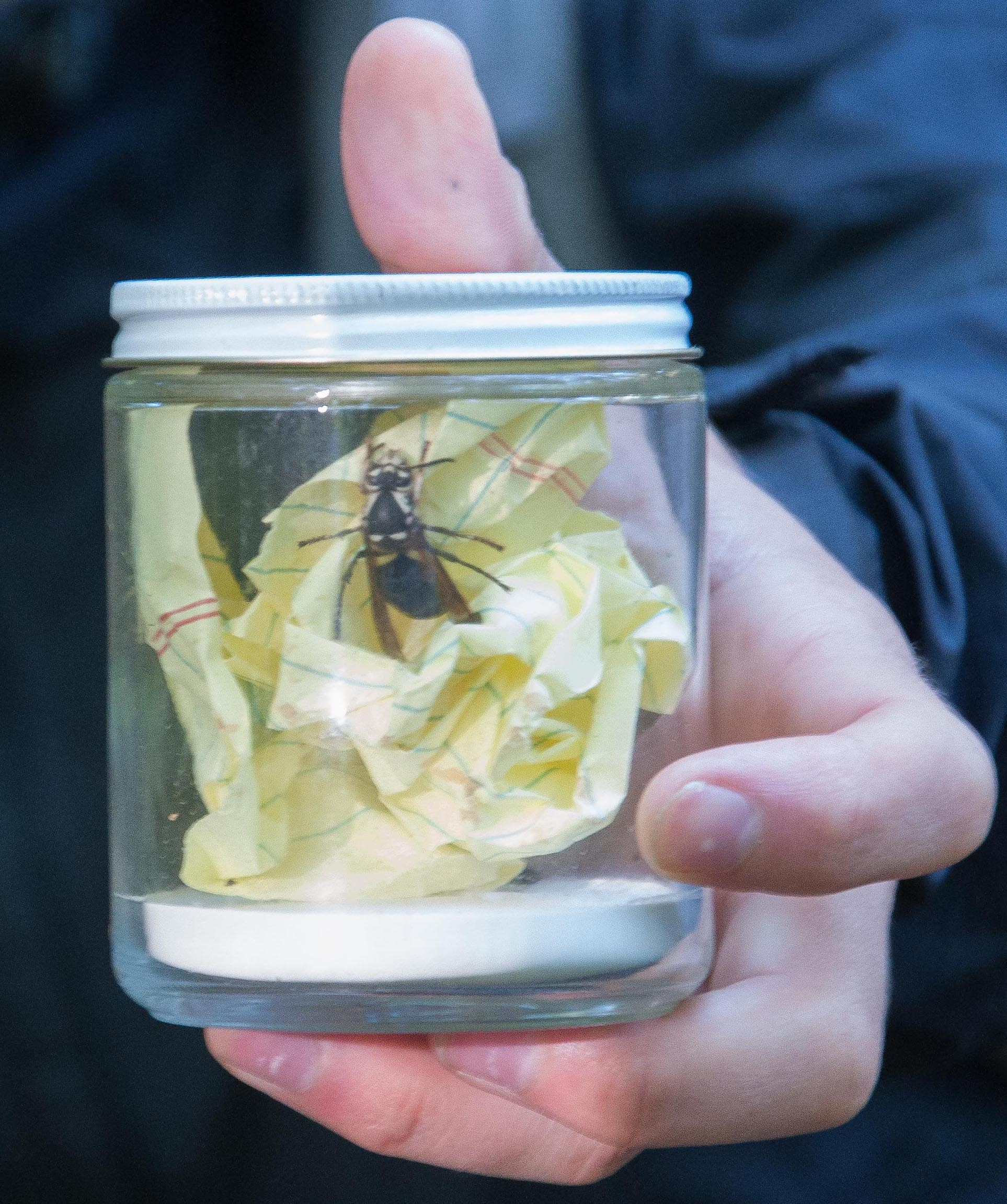
A wasp placed in a killing jar atop crumpled legal pad paper

A killing jar or killing bottle is a device used by entomologists to kill captured insects quickly and with minimum damage. The jar typically contains gypsum plaster (plaster of Paris) on the bottom to absorb a killing fluid. The killing fluid evaporates into the air and gasses the insect. Typically only adult hard bodied insects are killed in a killing jar; other insects require different methods of killing.

== Jar set-up ==
The jar, typically glass, must be hermetically sealable. One design has a thin layer of hardened plaster of Paris on the bottom to absorb the killing agent. The killing agent will then slowly evaporate, allowing the jar to be used many times before it needs to be refreshed. The absorbent plaster of Paris layer also helps prevent the agent sticking to and damaging insects. Crumpled paper tissue is also placed in the jar for the same reason. A second method utilises a wad of cotton or other absorbent material placed in the bottom of the jar. Liquid killing agent is added until the absorbent material is nearly saturated. A piece of stiff paper or cardboard cut to fit the inside of the jar tightly is then pressed in.

== Killing fluids ==
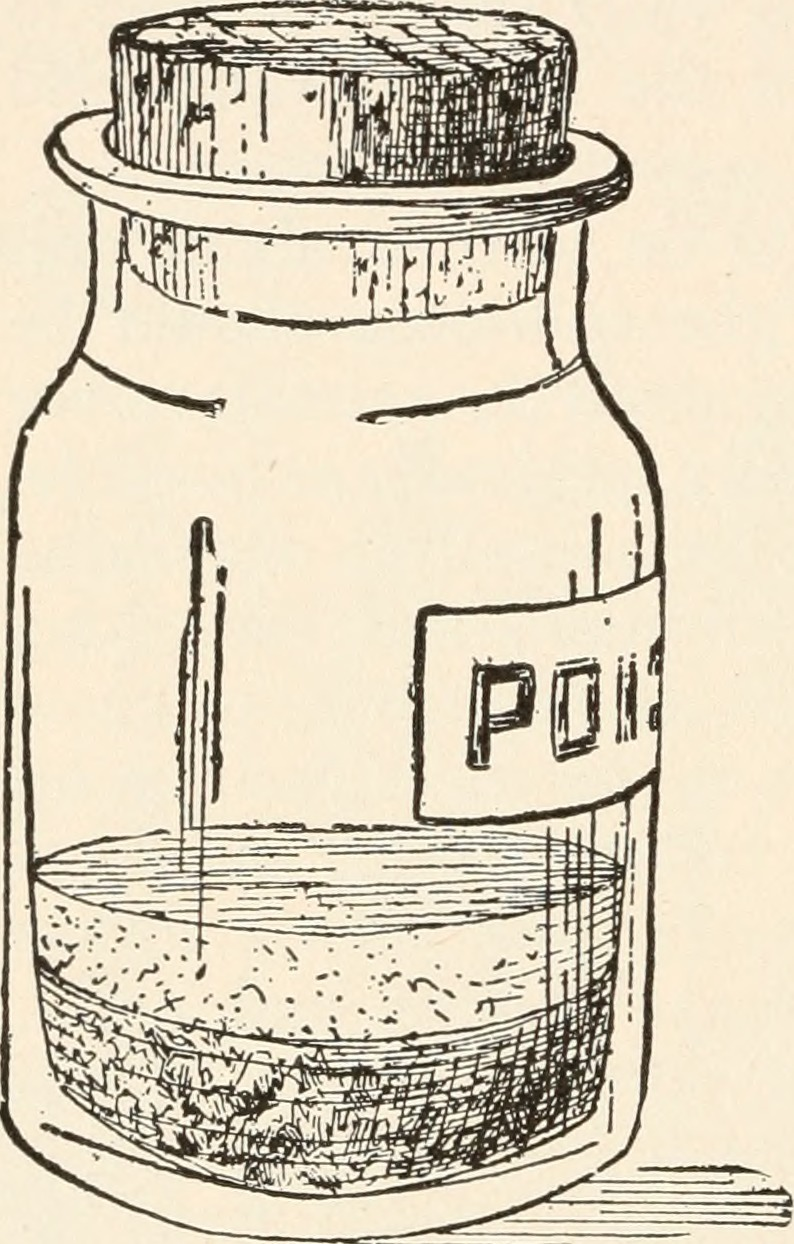
A diagram of a killing jar, with potassium cyanide at the bottom covered by plaster of Paris

The most common killing agents are ether, chloroform and ethyl acetate. Ethyl acetate has many advantages and is very widely used. Its fumes are less toxic to humans than those of the other agents, and specimens will remain limp if they are left in an ethyl acetate killing jar for several days and the ethyl acetate is not allowed to entirely evaporate from the specimens. It also preserves the body colors of some insects, such as dragonflies, that would otherwise lose their color, especially if there is a liquid layer to saturate their body tissues. A disadvantage is that, although the insects are quickly stunned by ethyl acetate, it kills them slowly and specimens may revive if removed from the killing jar too soon. Isopropyl alcohol is an easy to find and use killing agent for amateurs. Potassium cyanide or other cyanide compounds, including calcium cyanide, are also used, but only by experts due to its extreme toxicity. It also has the disadvantages that it makes the specimens brittle when left in the jar for several hours and that it may also cause some discoloration of colored specimens. It does kill rapidly, and the cyanide charge will last a long time. A few drops of acetic acid will increase the cyanide gas production. If the jar is not used for long periods it may dry out and produce little gas; a few drops of water will help get the process going again. The potassium cyanide slowly decomposes, releasing hydrogen cyanide. In former times, amateur entomologists commonly used the thick green leaves of the Cherry Laurel (Prunus laurocerasus or Prunus caroliniana) which, crushed or finely sliced, will similarly release hydrogen cyanide.

== Types of insects ==
Gassing in a killing jar is typically only used on adult hard-bodied insects. Soft-bodied and hard-bodied immature insects, such as the larval stage of many insects, are generally fixed in ethanol at 70–80% concentration in a vial. Dropping them in the vial containing ethanol both kills and preserves them. Higher concentrations of ethanol are not recommend for use with soft bodied insects, as it can distort and harden the body. Parasitic wasps are typically fixed in 95% alcohol to preserve the wing structure. Butterflies and moths are generally killed manually by crushing the thorax, as they can often destroy their wings by beating them against the jar.

== See also ==
- Insect collecting
- Container glass
