= Aspirator (entomology) =

Device used in the collection of small organisms

Two styles of aspirators. A. collecting jar with two stoppers; B. jar with one stopper. 1 - collecting tube; 2 - cork; 3- collection jar; 4 - cloth filter; 5 - tube for attaching a flexible hose; 6 - flexible hose for breathing air

In entomology, an aspirator, also known as a pooter, is a device used in the collection of insects, crustaceans or other small, fragile organisms, usually for scientific purposes.

== Design and use ==
Such devices are most commonly used by entomologists for field and lab work. One of the most common designs consists of a small resealable jar or vial, the lid or stopper of which is penetrated by two tubes. On the inner end of one tube, fine mesh or another type of filter is attached, and this tube leads to the user's mouth (usually connected by a long, flexible piece of tubing). The end of the second tube projects into the collecting chamber, and its far end can then be placed over an insect or other small organism; the user sucks on the first tube, and the insect is drawn into the collecting chamber through the other.

The other common design (the more traditional "pooter") consists of a length of flexible tubing, of which one end is held in the mouth, and the other end which holds the tip. The tip is usually a glass or plastic pipette inserted into the plastic tubing, with a piece of gauze as a filter at the inner end to prevent accidental ingestion. Small insects (e.g., Drosophila) may be gently collected and held against the filter by steady inhalation, and transferred into a container by then blowing the insect(s) out. A skilled lab worker, for instance, may be able to sequentially inhale and then transfer a pooter-full of Drosophila flies singly into vials, thus facilitating rapid setup of fly experiments with a minimum of pain caused to the researcher, or the researched. Larger, motor-powered variants of this design exist (typically, a leaf blower working in reverse), often named D-Vac, where the insects are sucked into a mesh collecting bag in a long plastic tube, and held there by the powerful suction

In entomological surveys pooters are usually used in combination with insect nets or beating nets but may also be used alone to collect insects seen on vegetation or tree trunks.

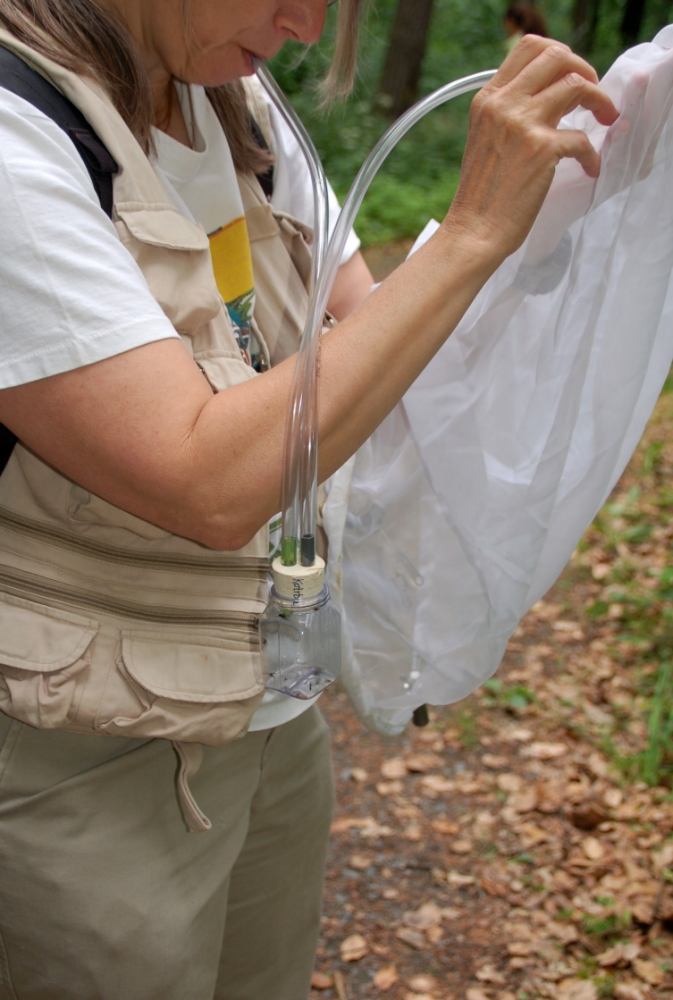
Using a pooter to extract insects from an insect net

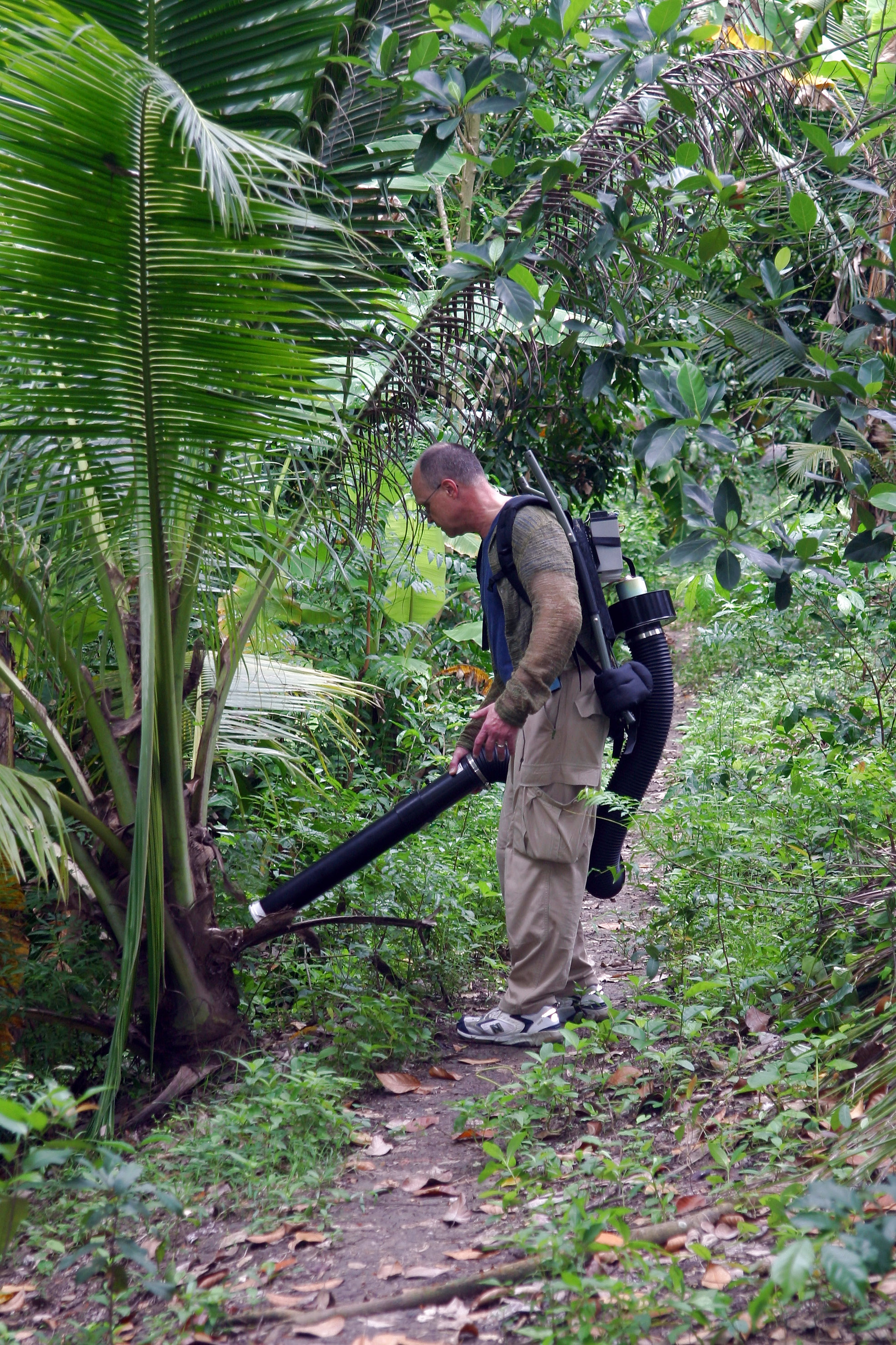
An entomologist using a large powered aspirator to collect mosquitoes in northern Thailand

== History ==
The two-tubes aspirator design was first presented in a 1929 paper by Frederick William Poos, Jr., who is also the namesake of the term "pooter".
