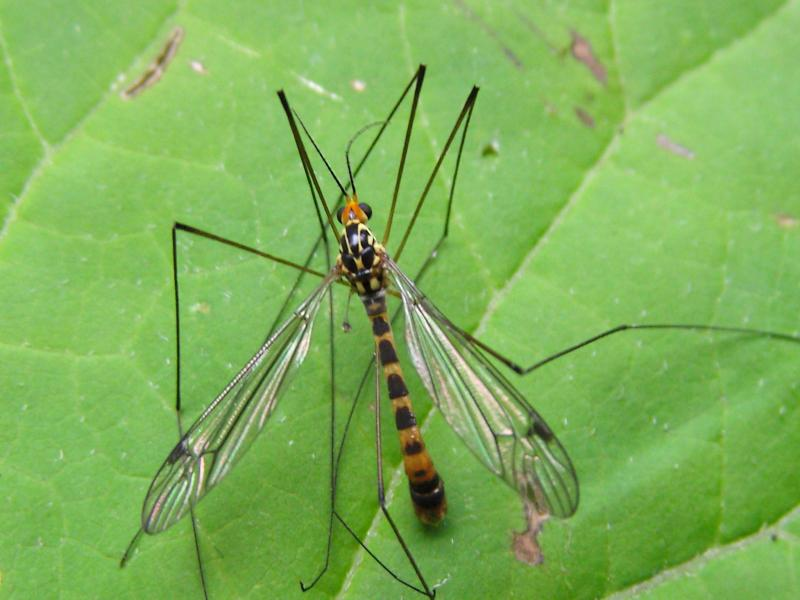
- Male
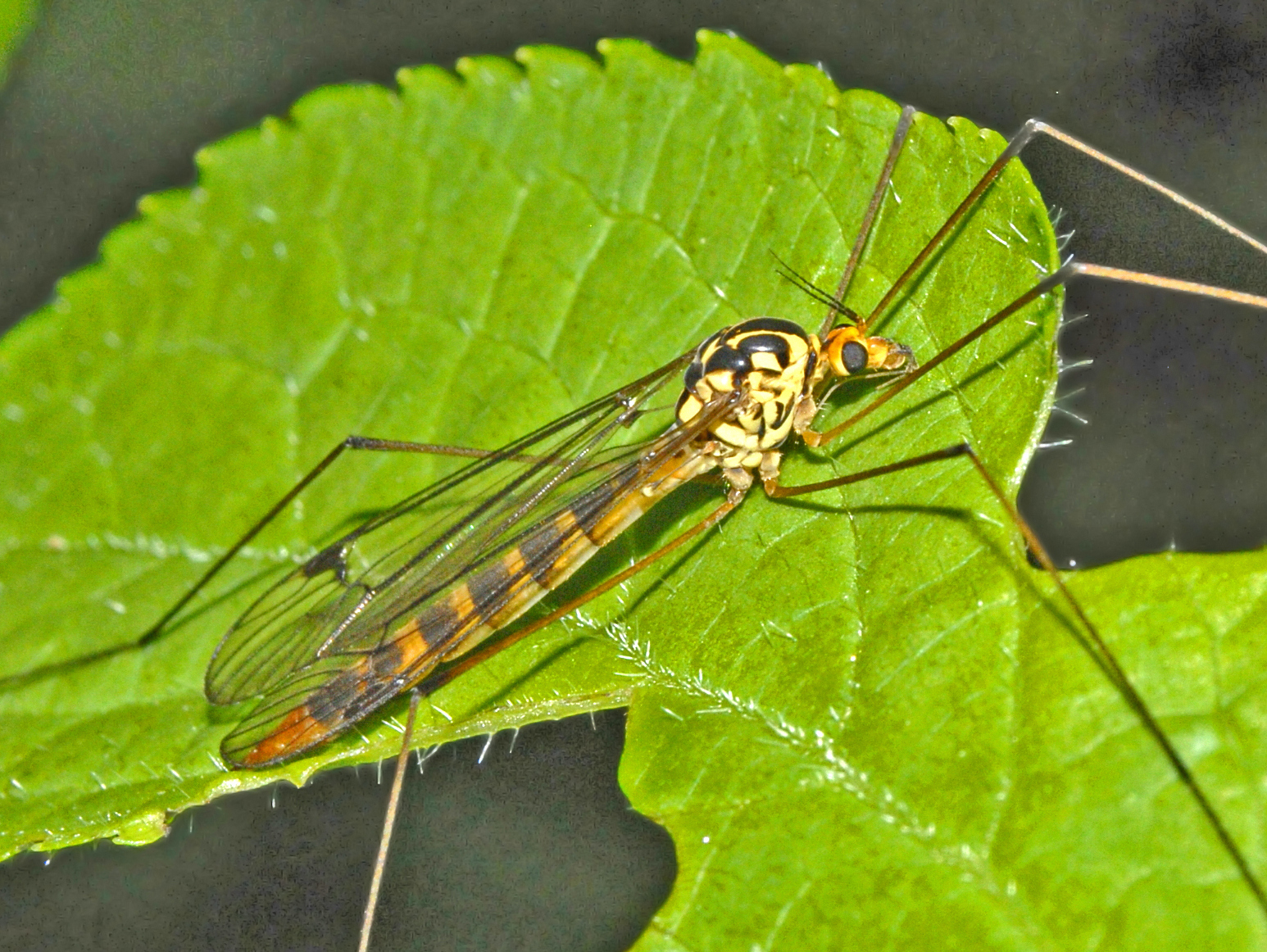
- Female

Scientific classification
- Kingdom: Animalia
- Phylum: Arthropoda
- Clade: Pancrustacea
- Class: Insecta
- Order: Diptera
- Family: Tipulidae
- Genus: Nephrotoma
- Species: N. flavipalpis

Binomial name
- Nephrotoma flavipalpis (Meigen, 1830)

Synonyms
- Nephrotoma bichroma (Pierre, 1924); Nephrotoma crinicauda (Riedel, 1910); Nephrotoma flavirostris (Strobl, 1909); Nephrotoma verticalis (Becker, 1907)

= Nephrotoma flavipalpis =

Species of fly

Nephrotoma flavipalpis is a species of crane flies in the family Tipulidae.

== Distribution and habitat ==
This species can be found in most of Europe (Albania, Austria, Belgium, Bosnia-Herzegovina, Croatia, Denmark, France (incl Corsica), Germany, Great Britain, Greece, Ireland, Italy, Lithuania, Luxembourg, Montenegro, Netherlands, Portugal, Romania, Spain, Sweden, Switzerland) and in North Africa (Algeria, Tunisia). These crane flies usually inhabit woods and hedge rows.

== Description ==
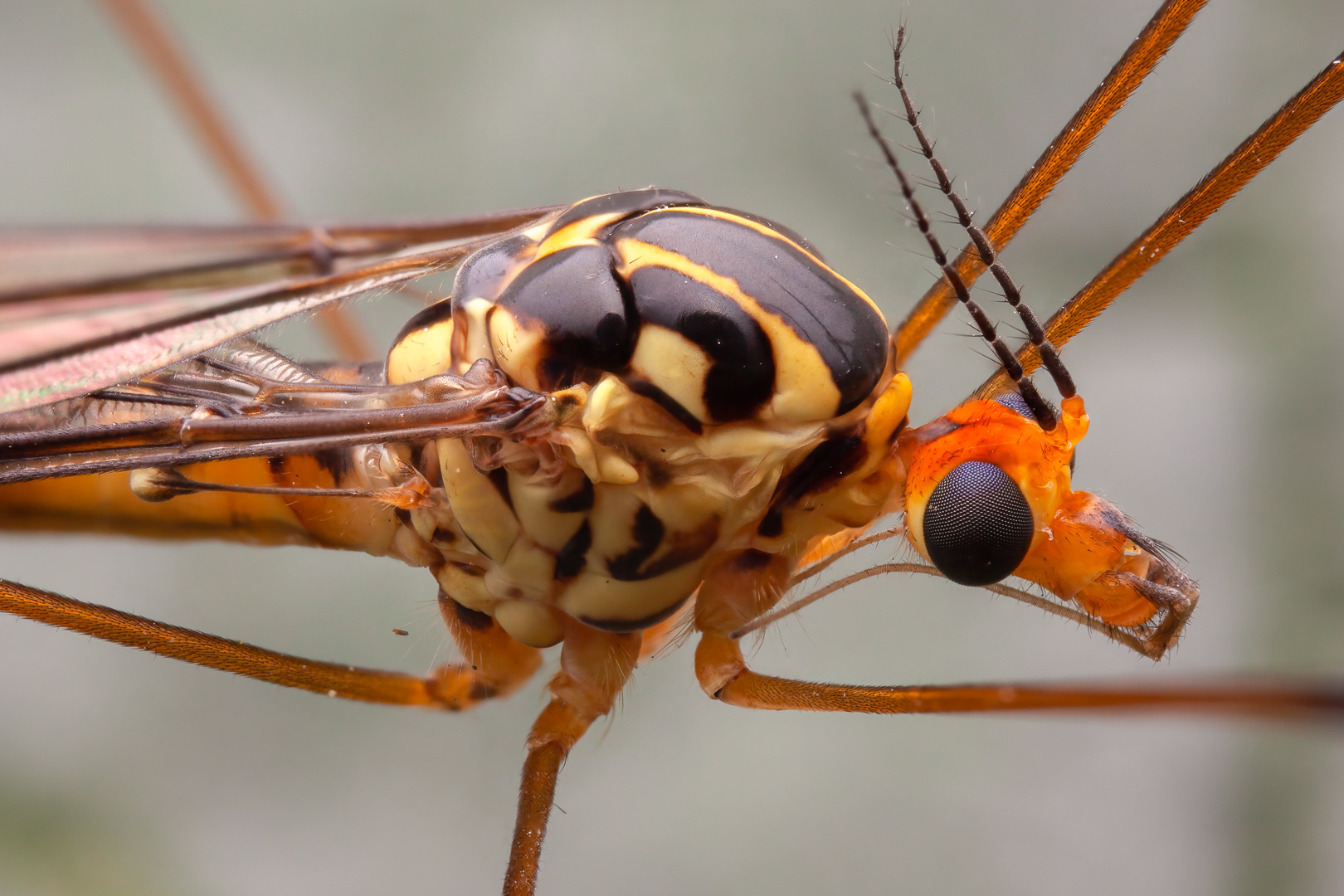
Close-up

Nephrotoma flavipalpis can reach a body length of about 12–18 mm (0.47–0.71 in) and a wing length of about 10–18 mm (0.39–0.71 in). These crane flies show a lustrous body and a mainly yellow head, with a short proboscis (rostrum) and verticillate antennae. Thorax is yellow and black. On the abdomen there are black and yellow bands. On the wings is present a dark stigma.

This species is very similar to Nephrotoma scalaris.

== Biology ==
Adults can be seen from June to October. The larvae live in soil.
