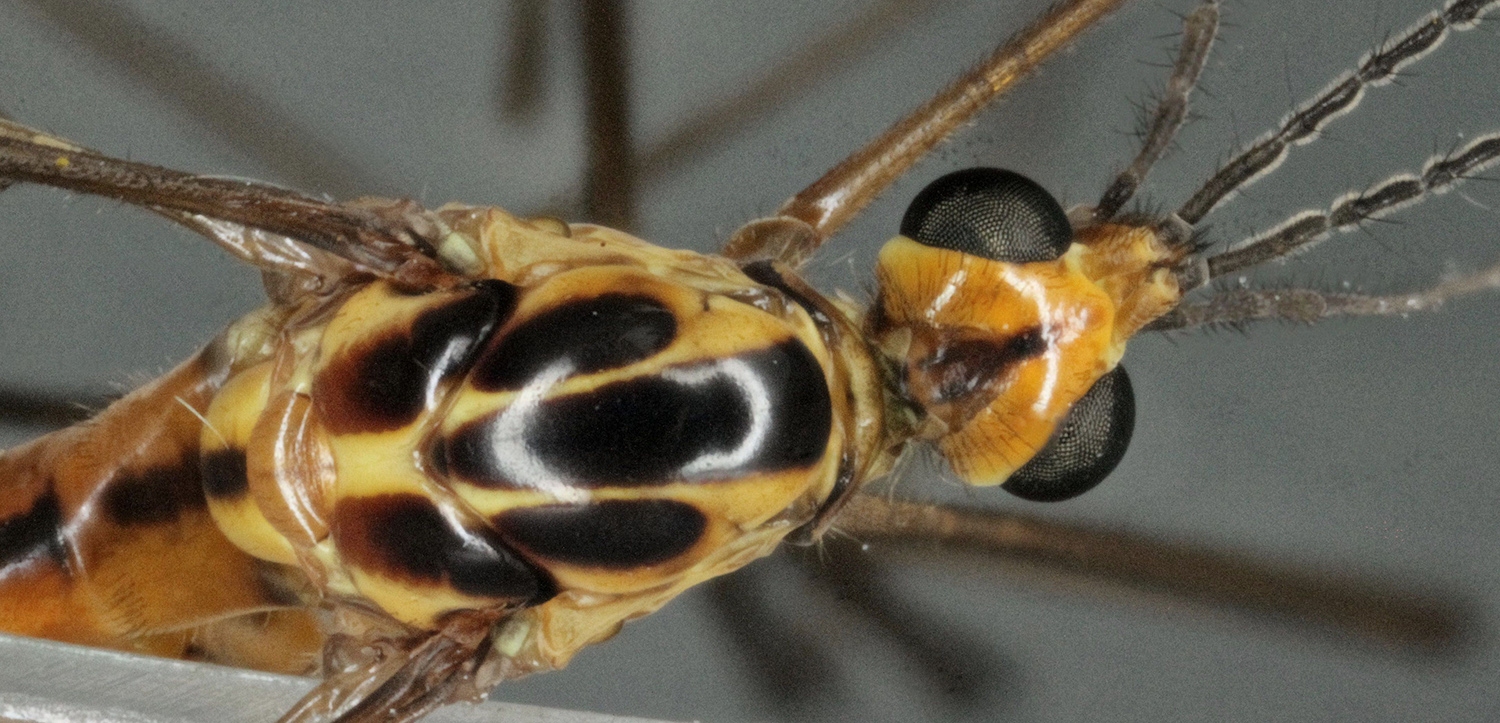

Scientific classification
- Kingdom: Animalia
- Phylum: Arthropoda
- Clade: Pancrustacea
- Class: Insecta
- Order: Diptera
- Family: Tipulidae
- Genus: Nephrotoma
- Species: N. scurra

Binomial name
- Nephrotoma scurra (Meigen, 1818)

Synonyms
- Tipula scurra Meigen, 1818; Nephrotoma nodulosa (Brullé, 1833); Tipula nodulosa (Brullé, 1833); Nephrotoma stejnegeri Alexander, 1918

= Nephrotoma scurra =

Species of fly

Nephrotoma scurra is a species of crane fly found in most of Europe and the East Palearctic. It should not be confused with the crane fly Pselliophora scurra Alexander, 1941, from the subfamily Ctenophorinae.
