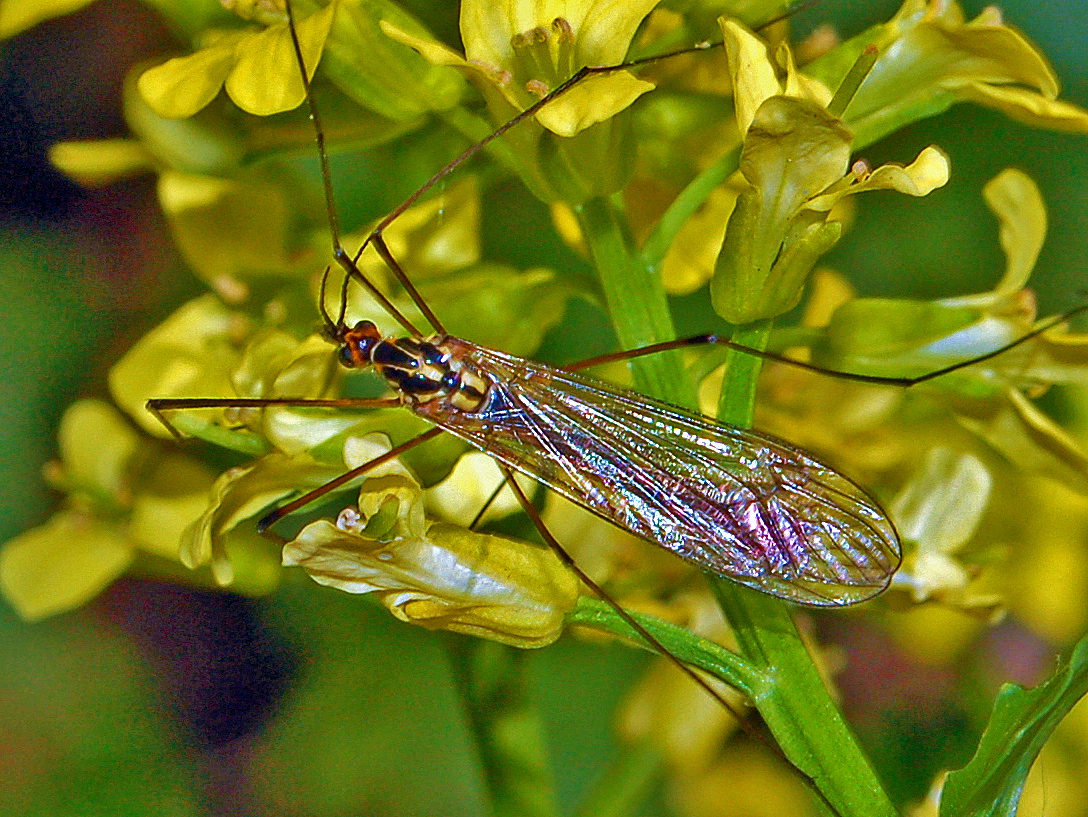

Scientific classification
- Kingdom: Animalia
- Phylum: Arthropoda
- Clade: Pancrustacea
- Class: Insecta
- Order: Diptera
- Family: Tipulidae
- Genus: Nephrotoma
- Species: N. appendiculata

Binomial name
- Nephrotoma appendiculata (Pierre, 1919)

Synonyms
- Pachyrhina appendiculata Pierre, 1919; Tipula maculata Meigen, 1804; Tipula maculosa Meigen, 1818

= Nephrotoma appendiculata =

Species of fly

Nephrotoma appendiculata, the spotted crane fly, is a species of crane fly.

== Subspecies ==
Subspecies include:

- Nephrotoma appendiculata appendiculata (Pierre, 1919) (Northwestern Europe and the Near East)
- Nephrotoma appendiculata pertenua Oosterbroek, 1978 (Southwestern Europe and North Africa)

== Distribution ==
This species is present in most of Europe, in North Africa and in the Near East. Some in Southern Alberta Canada.

== Habitat ==
These crane flies inhabit woodland edges, gardens, fields, rough grassland, and farmland.

== Description ==
Nephrotoma appendiculata has a wingspan of about 50 mm (2.0 in), and a body length of 13–15 mm (0.5–0.6 in). The body is yellow with a few short, black stripes on the thorax, a black horseshoe mark on the side and a broad dark stripe on each section of the abdomen. The wings have a thin, yellow line near the leading edge. The wing stigma is usually pale, but sometimes it is dark.

This species is rather similar to Nephrotoma flavescens.

== Biology ==
Adults can be seen from April to August. The larvae, known as "leatherjackets", feed on the roots of grasses, while the adults feed on umbellifers such as cow parsley.

== Gallery ==
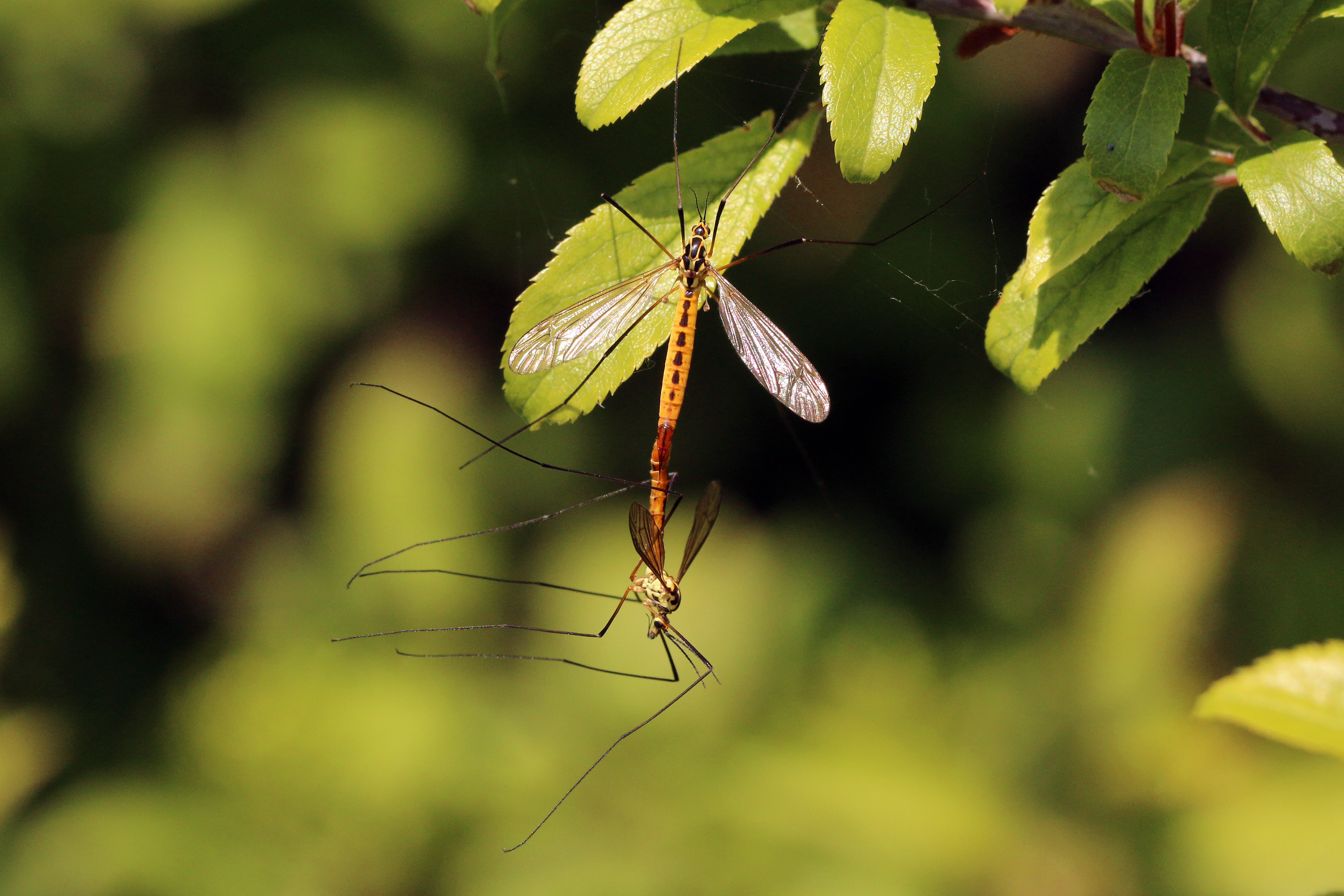
Mating

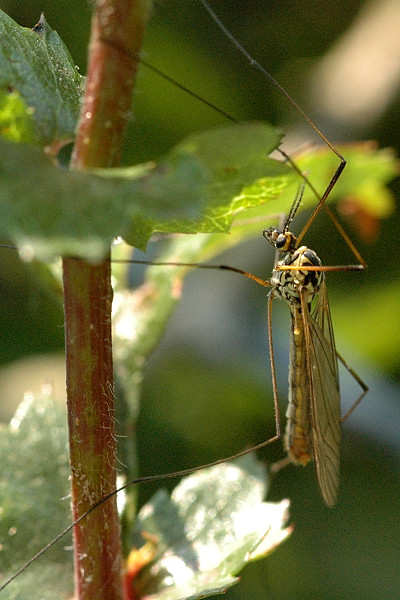
Male

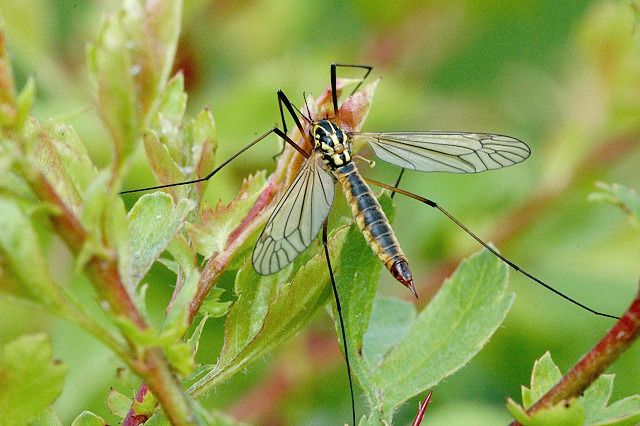
Female

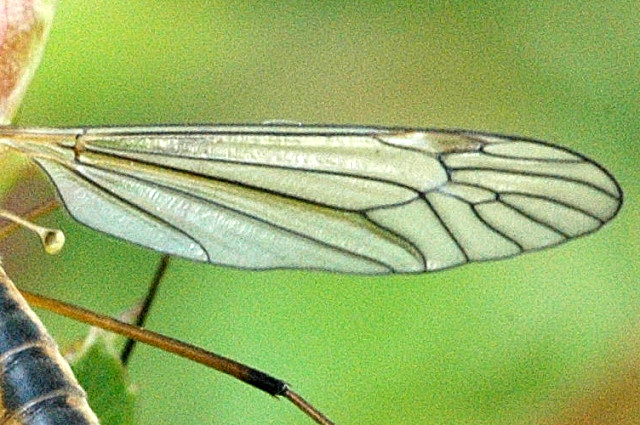
Wing detail
