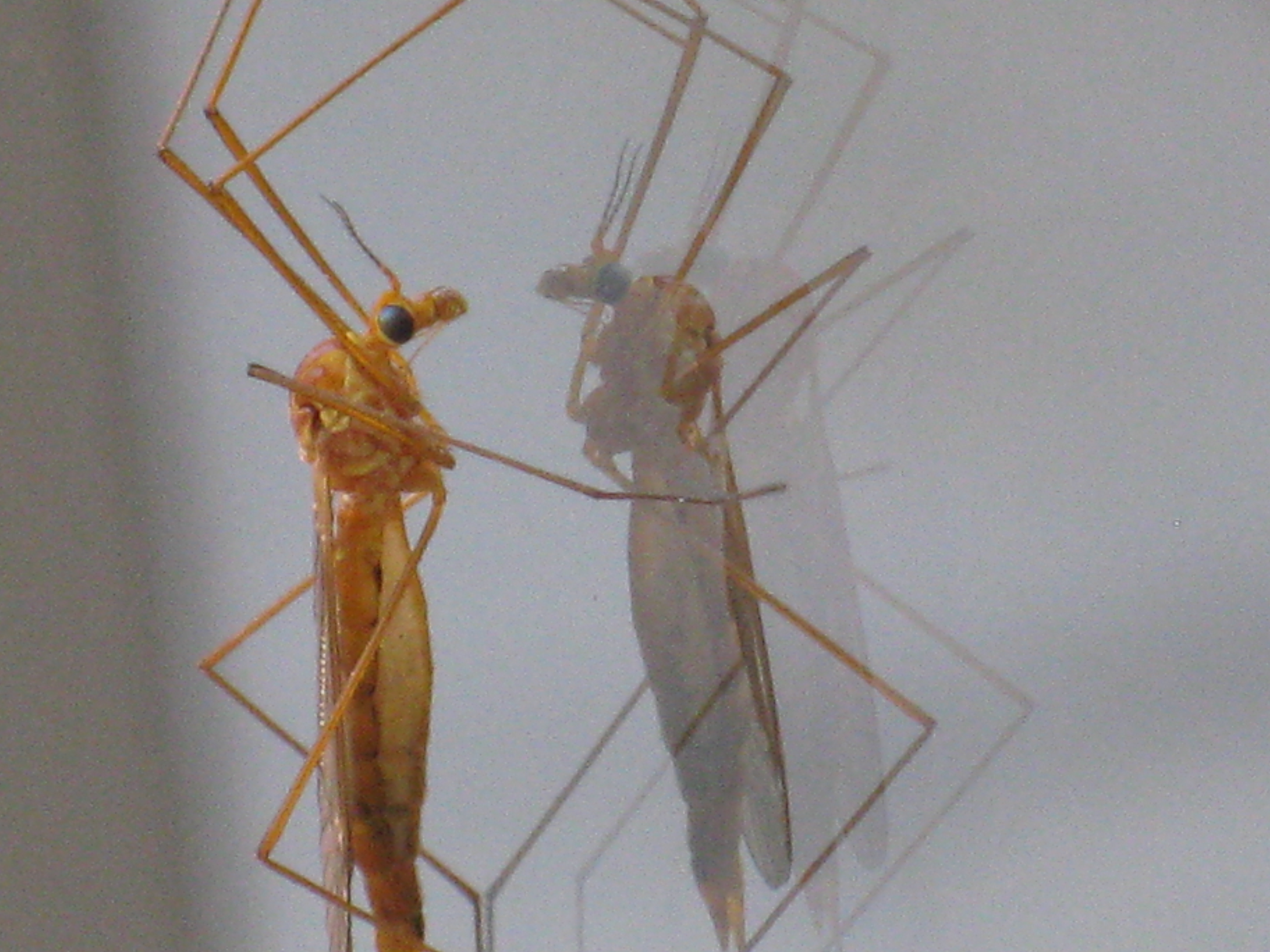

Scientific classification
- Kingdom: Animalia
- Phylum: Arthropoda
- Class: Insecta
- Order: Diptera
- Infraorder: Tipulomorpha
- Superfamily: Tipuloidea
- Family: Tipulidae
- Subfamily: Tipulinae
- Genus: Nephrotoma
- Species: N. suturalis

Binomial name
- Nephrotoma suturalis (Loew, 1863)

Synonyms
- Nephrotoma costomarginata (Dietz, 1918); Pachyrhina suturalis Loew, 1863

= Nephrotoma suturalis =

Subspecies of fly

Nephrotoma suturalis is a species of tiger crane fly in the family Tipulidae.

== Subspecies ==
These two subspecies belong to the species Nephrotoma suturalis:

- Nephrotoma suturalis suturalis (Loew, 1863) (Southeastern USA)
- Nephrotoma suturalis wulpiana (Bergroth, 1888) (Southeastern USA, Western North America, Adventive in Spain, Portugal, and Hawaii)

== Location ==
This subspecies can also be found in New England, Brazil, Florida, and Hawaii
