= Nephrotoma kigeziana =

Scientific classification
- Kingdom: Animalia
- Phylum: Arthropoda
- Class: Insecta
- Order: Diptera
- Family: Tipulidae
- Genus: Nephrotoma
- Species: N. kigeziana

Binomial name
- Nephrotoma kigeziana Alexander, 1956

Species of fly

Nephrotoma kigeziana is a species of fly from the family Tipulidae. The scientific name of this species was first published in 1956 by Alexander. This species can be found in the Afrotropical realm.

== Subspecies ==
- Nephrotoma kigeziana celator Alexander 1956
- Nephrotoma kigeziana trigona Alexander 1956
