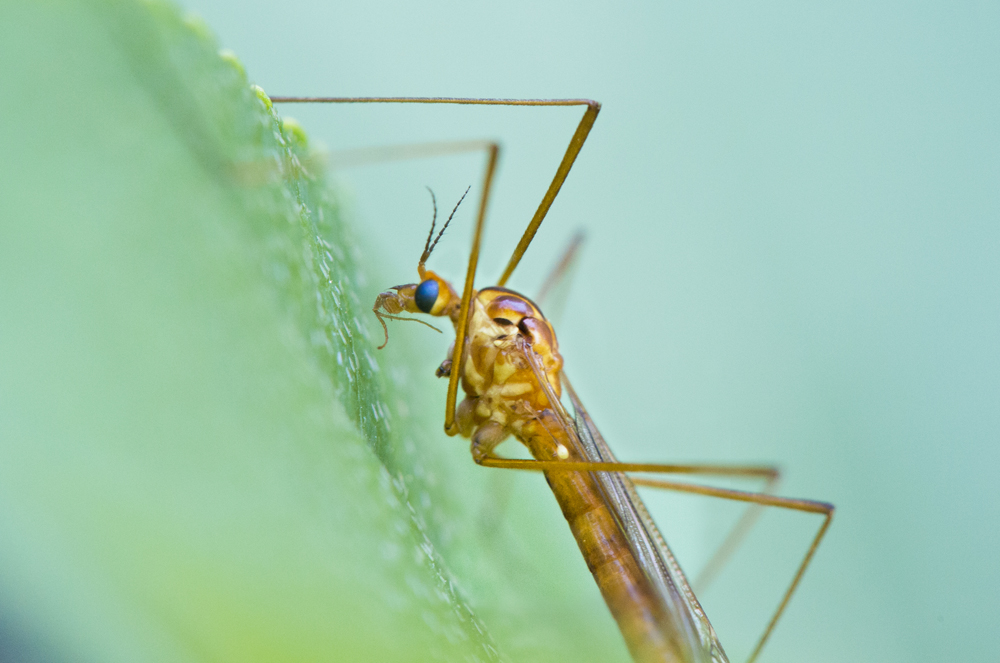

Scientific classification
- Kingdom: Animalia
- Phylum: Arthropoda
- Class: Insecta
- Order: Diptera
- Family: Tipulidae
- Genus: Nephrotoma
- Species: N. ferruginea

Binomial name
- Nephrotoma ferruginea Fabricius, 1805

= Nephrotoma ferruginea =

Species of fly

Nephrotoma ferruginea is a species of large crane fly in the family Tipulidae.

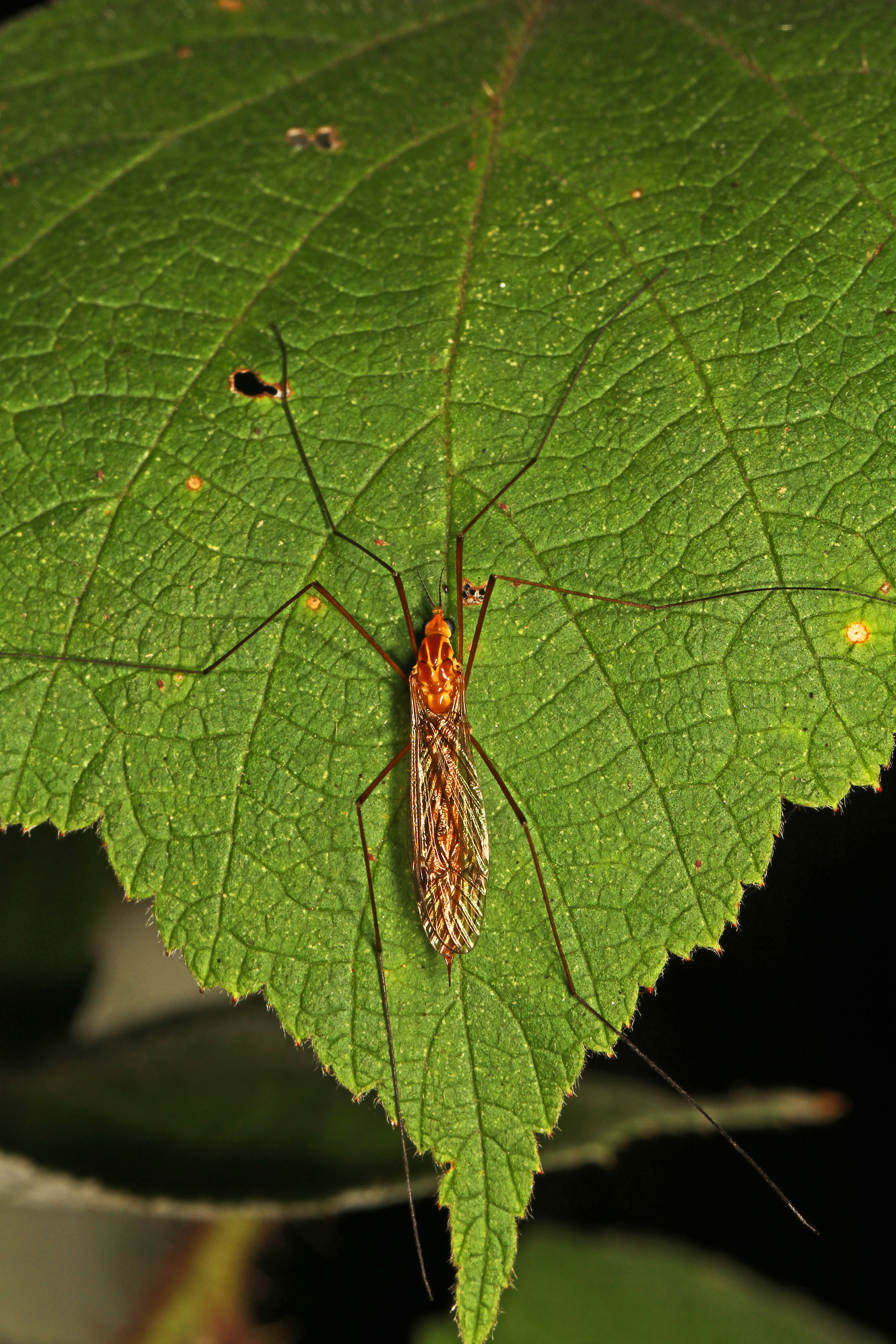

== Subspecies ==
These two subspecies belong to the species Nephrotoma ferruginea:

- Nephrotoma ferruginea ferruginea Fabricius, 1805^{i g}
- Nephrotoma ferruginea surtularis (Loew, 1863)^{i g}

Data sources: i = ITIS, c = Catalogue of Life, g = GBIF, b = Bugguide.net

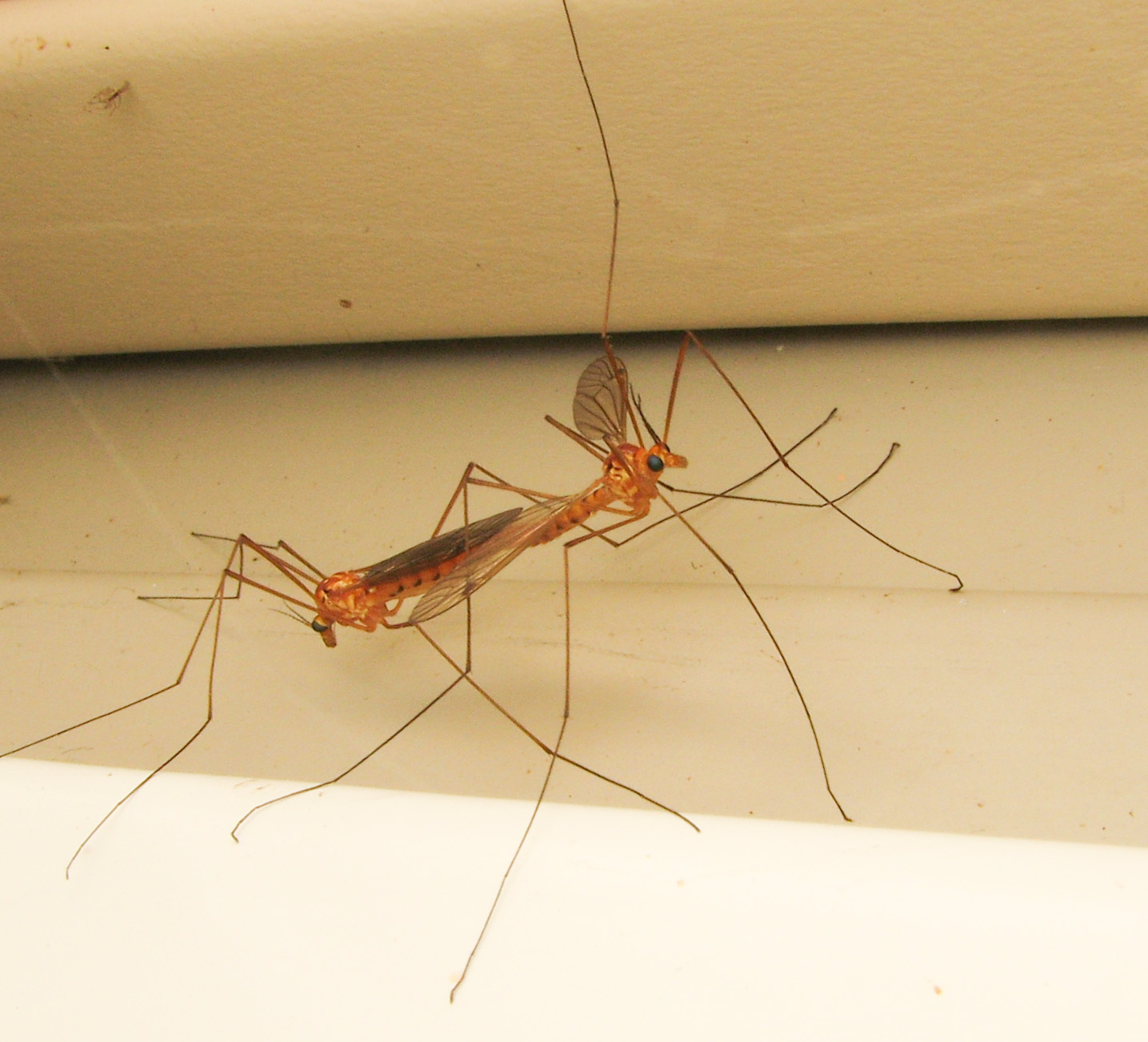
Nephrotoma ferruginea mating
