= Nephrotoma cingulata =

Scientific classification
- Kingdom: Animalia
- Phylum: Arthropoda
- Clade: Pancrustacea
- Class: Insecta
- Order: Diptera
- Family: Tipulidae
- Genus: Nephrotoma
- Species: N. cingulata

Binomial name
- Nephrotoma cingulata (Dietz, 1918)

Synonyms
- Pachyrhina cingulata Dietz, 1918

Species of fly

Nephrotoma cingulata is a species of large crane fly in the family Tipulidae.
