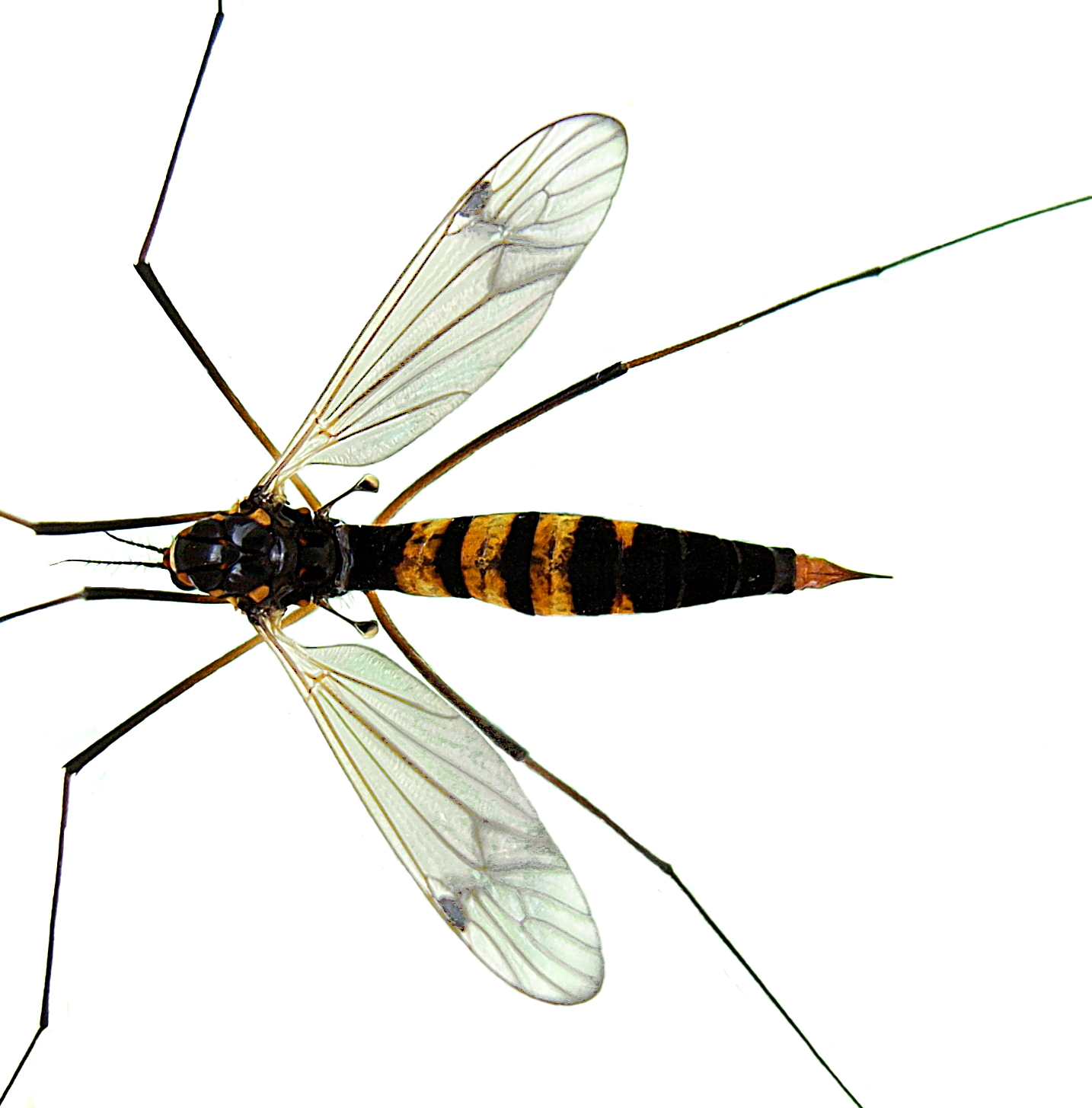
- Nephrotoma crocata female

Scientific classification
- Kingdom: Animalia
- Phylum: Arthropoda
- Clade: Pancrustacea
- Class: Insecta
- Order: Diptera
- Family: Tipulidae
- Genus: Nephrotoma
- Species: N. crocata

Binomial name
- Nephrotoma crocata (Linnaeus, 1758)

Synonyms
- Tipula crocata Linnaeus, 1758; Tipula flavofasciata De Geer, 1776; Tipula perpulcher Harris, 1780; Nephrotoma flavofasciata (De Geer, 1776); Nephrotoma hartigi (Mannheims, 1951); Nephrotoma perpulcher (Harris, 1780); Pales hartigi Mannheims, 1951

= Nephrotoma crocata =

Species of fly

Nephrotoma crocata is a species of crane fly found in most of Europe and northern Russia. The subspecies N. c. luteata is found in southwest France, Portugal, Spain, Morocco, and Algeria.

== Subspecies ==
- N. c. crocata (Linnaeus, 1758)
- N. c. luteata (Meigen, )
