= Nephrotoma macrocera =

Scientific classification
- Kingdom: Animalia
- Phylum: Arthropoda
- Class: Insecta
- Order: Diptera
- Family: Tipulidae
- Genus: Nephrotoma
- Species: N. macrocera

Binomial name
- Nephrotoma macrocera (Say, 1823)

Synonyms
- Pachyrhina atrocera Dietz, 1918; Pachyrhina hirsutula Dietz, 1918; Pachyrhina virgata Dietz, 1921; Tipula macrocera Say, 1823

Species of fly

Nephrotoma macrocera is a species of large crane fly in the family Tipulidae.
