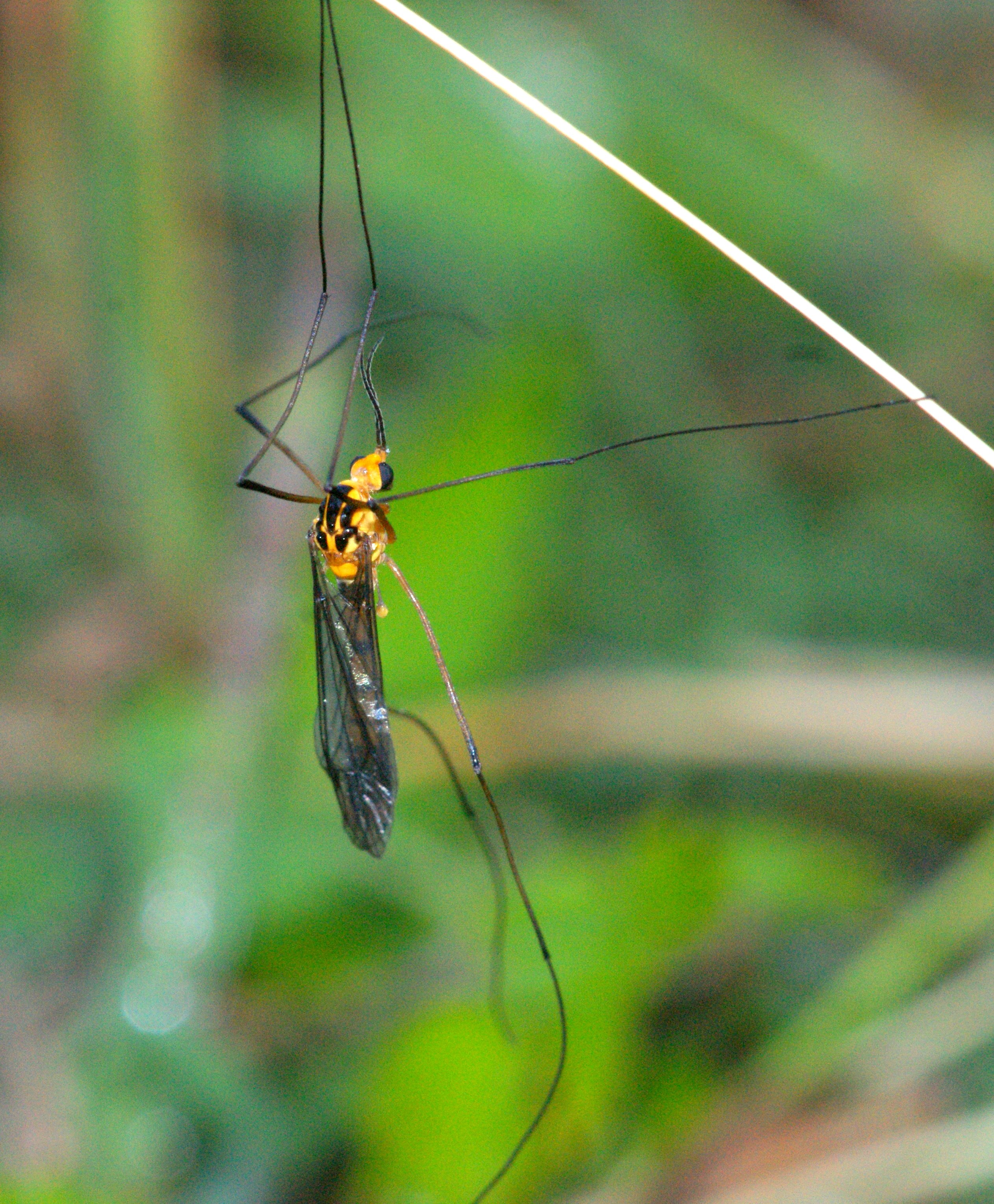

Scientific classification
- Kingdom: Animalia
- Phylum: Arthropoda
- Class: Insecta
- Order: Diptera
- Family: Tipulidae
- Genus: Nephrotoma
- Species: N. australasiae

Binomial name
- Nephrotoma australasiae (Skuse, 1890)

Synonyms
- Pachyrrhina australasiae Skuse, 1890

= Nephrotoma australasiae =

Species of fly

Nephrotoma australasiae the Australasian tiger crane fly is a species of fly in the family Tipulidae. It is found in Australia .
