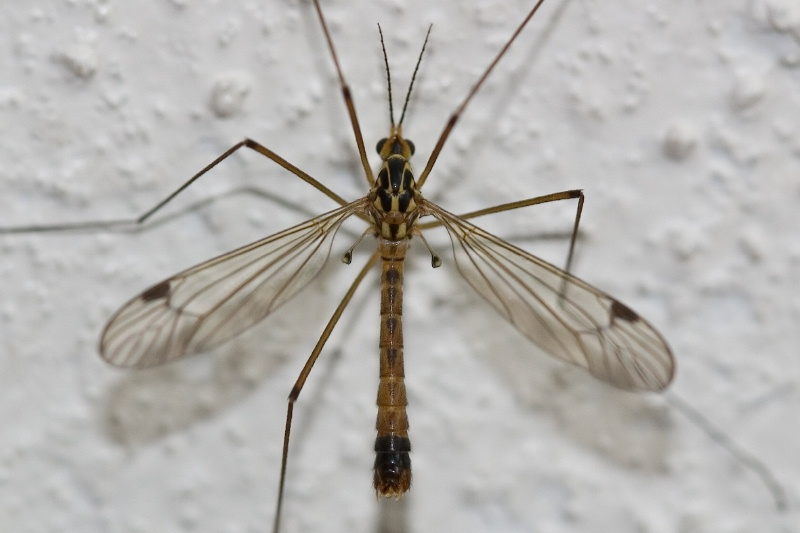

Scientific classification
- Kingdom: Animalia
- Phylum: Arthropoda
- Class: Insecta
- Order: Diptera
- Family: Tipulidae
- Genus: Nephrotoma
- Species: N. guestfalica

Binomial name
- Nephrotoma guestfalica (Westhoff, 1879)

Synonyms
- Pachyrhina guestfalica Westhoff, 1879

= Nephrotoma guestfalica =

Species of fly

Nephrotoma guestfalica is a species of crane fly within the family Tipulidae. It is present throughout the Palearctic and the species consists of multiple subspecies. Nephrotoma guestfalica has a preference for sandy soils, especially river banks.

== Subspecies ==
- Nephrotoma guestfalica guestfalica (Westhoff, 1879) - Native to Algeria and Tunisia.
- Nephrotoma guestfalica hartigiana Oosterbroek, 1982 - Native to Morocco.
- Nephrotoma guestfalica surcoufi (Pierre, 1925) - Native to Sardinia.
- Nephrotoma guestfalica vaillanti (de Jong, Adghir and Bosch, 2021) - Native to: Belarus, Belgium, Bosnia-Herzegovina, Bulgaria, Croatia, Corsica, Czech Republic, Denmark, France, Germany, Great Britain, Greece, Hungary, Italy, Luxembourg, Netherlands, North Macedonia, Poland, Portugal, Romania, Slovakia, Spain, South Sweden, Switzerland, Turkey. It can also be found on the islands of Corsica, Corfu, Lefkada, Lesvos, Kerkyra, Sicily, Mallorca.
