= Nephrotoma eucera =

Scientific classification
- Kingdom: Animalia
- Phylum: Arthropoda
- Class: Insecta
- Order: Diptera
- Family: Tipulidae
- Genus: Nephrotoma
- Species: N. eucera

Binomial name
- Nephrotoma eucera (Loew, 1863)

Synonyms
- Pachyrhina eucera Loew, 1863

Species of fly

Nephrotoma eucera is a species of large crane fly in the family Tipulidae.
