= Nephrotoma tenuis =

Scientific classification
- Kingdom: Animalia
- Phylum: Arthropoda
- Class: Insecta
- Order: Diptera
- Family: Tipulidae
- Genus: Nephrotoma
- Species: N. tenuis

Binomial name
- Nephrotoma tenuis (Loew, 1863)

Synonyms
- Pachyrhina hamata Dietz, 1918; Pachyrhina nigroantennata Dietz, 1921; Pachyrhina tenuis Loew, 1863

Species of fly

Nephrotoma tenuis is a species of large crane fly in the family Tipulidae.

== Subspecies ==
These two subspecies belong to the species Nephrotoma tenuis:

- Nephrotoma tenuis fuscostigmosa Alexander
- Nephrotoma tenuis tenuis
