= Nephrotoma altissima =

Scientific classification
- Kingdom: Animalia
- Phylum: Arthropoda
- Class: Insecta
- Order: Diptera
- Family: Tipulidae
- Genus: Nephrotoma
- Species: N. altissima

Binomial name
- Nephrotoma altissima (Osten Sacken, 1877)

Synonyms
- Pachyrhina altissima Osten Sacken, 1877; Pachyrhina erythrophrys Williston, 1893

Species of fly

Nephrotoma altissima is a species of large crane fly in the family Tipulidae.
