= Nephrotoma occipitalis =

Scientific classification
- Kingdom: Animalia
- Phylum: Arthropoda
- Class: Insecta
- Order: Diptera
- Family: Tipulidae
- Genus: Nephrotoma
- Species: N. occipitalis

Binomial name
- Nephrotoma occipitalis (Loew, 1864)

Synonyms
- Pachyrhina occipitalis Loew, 1864

Species of fly

Nephrotoma occipitalis is a species of large crane fly in the family Tipulidae.
