= Pselliophora flavibasis =

Scientific classification
- Kingdom: Animalia
- Phylum: Arthropoda
- Class: Insecta
- Order: Diptera
- Family: Tipulidae
- Genus: Pselliophora
- Species: P. flavibasis

Binomial name
- Pselliophora flavibasis Edwards, 1916

Species of fly

Pselliophora flavibasis, the white crane fly, is a species of crane fly.
