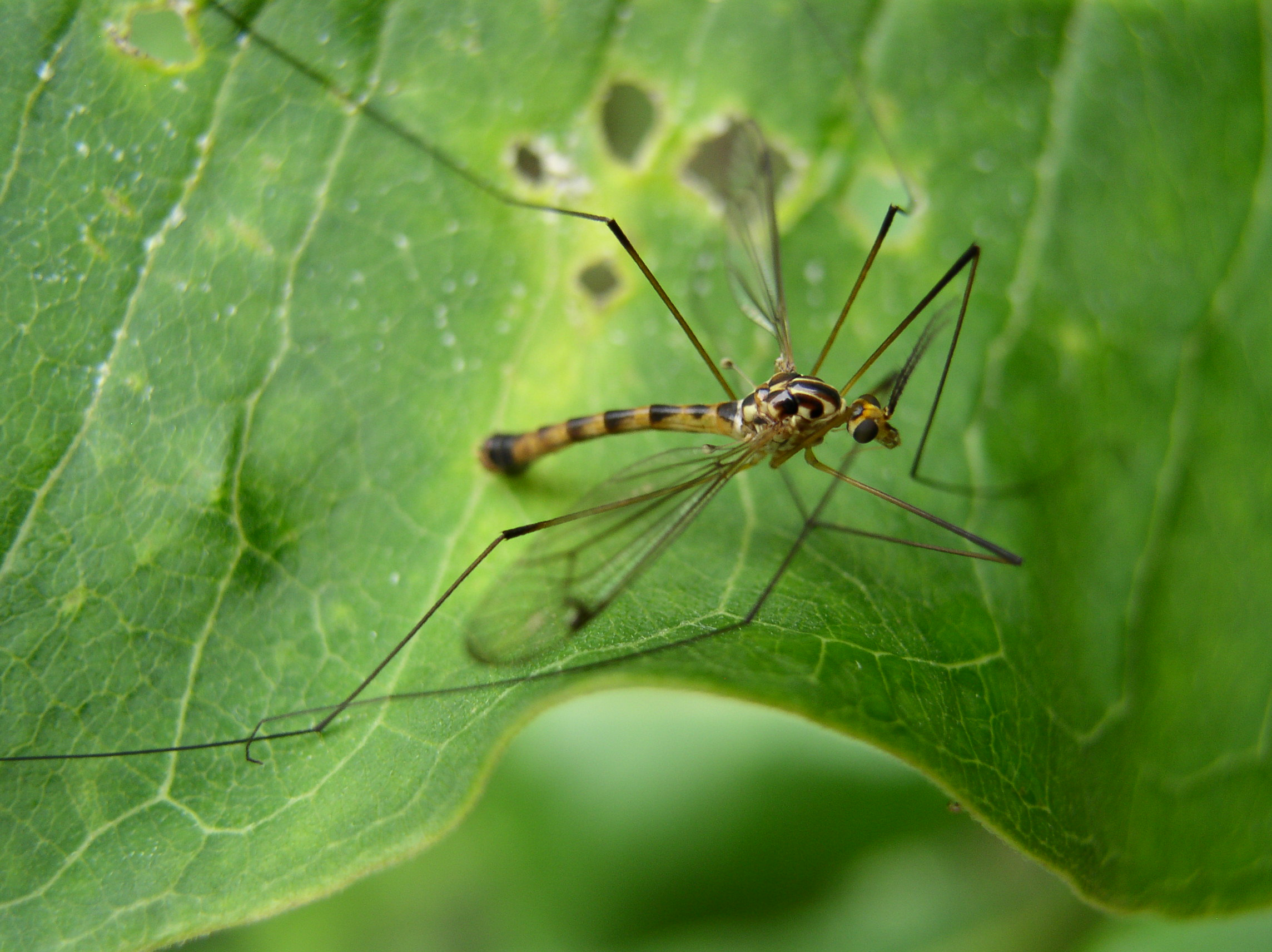

Scientific classification
- Kingdom: Animalia
- Phylum: Arthropoda
- Class: Insecta
- Order: Diptera
- Family: Tipulidae
- Genus: Nephrotoma
- Species: N. alterna

Binomial name
- Nephrotoma alterna (Walker, 1848)

Synonyms
- Pachyrhina evasa Dietz, 1918; Pachyrhina incurva Loew, 1863; Pachyrhina montana Dietz, 1918; Pachyrhina nexilis Dietz, 1918; Pachyrhina perdita Dietz, 1918; Tipula alterna Walker, 1848

= Nephrotoma alterna =

Species of fly

Nephrotoma alterna is a species of large crane fly in the family Tipulidae.
