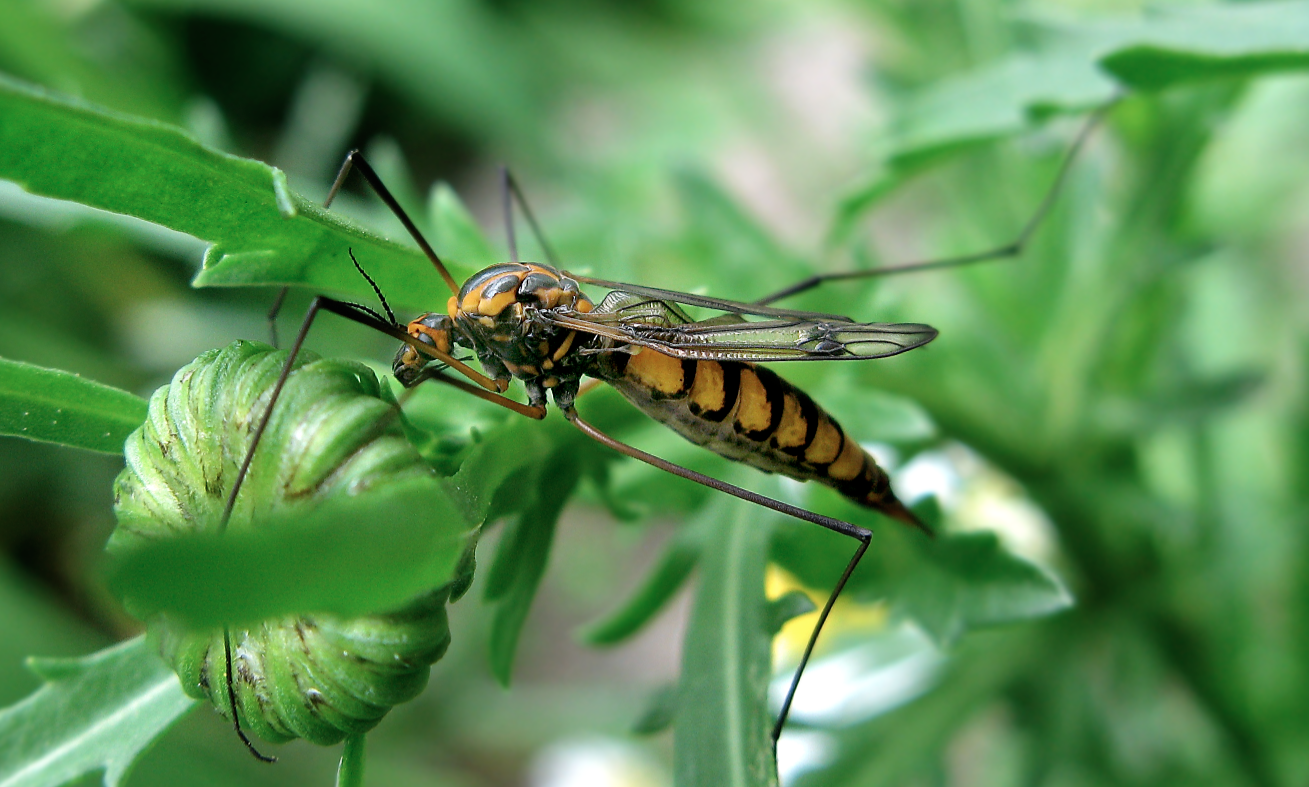

Scientific classification
- Kingdom: Animalia
- Phylum: Arthropoda
- Class: Insecta
- Order: Diptera
- Family: Tipulidae
- Genus: Nephrotoma
- Species: N. pedunculata

Binomial name
- Nephrotoma pedunculata (Loew, 1863)

Synonyms
- Pachyrhina pedunculata Loew, 1863

= Nephrotoma pedunculata =

Species of fly

Nephrotoma pedunculata is a species of large crane fly in the family Tipulidae.
