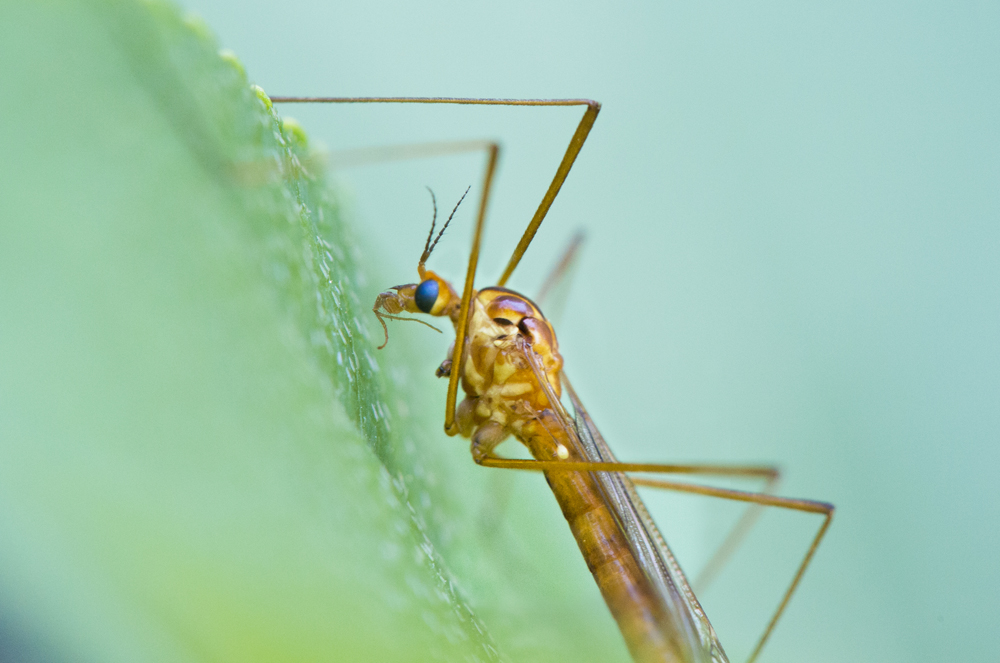
- Nephrotoma ferruginea

Scientific classification
- Kingdom: Animalia
- Phylum: Arthropoda
- Clade: Pancrustacea
- Class: Insecta
- Order: Diptera
- Family: Tipulidae
- Subfamily: Tipulinae
- Genus: Nephrotoma; Meigen, 1828

Type species
- Tipula dorsalis Fabricius, 1781

Synonyms
- Pales Meigen, 1800; Pachyrhina Macquart, 1834; Pachyrina authors; Pachyrrhina authors; Pachyrhyna authors

= Nephrotoma =

Genus of flies

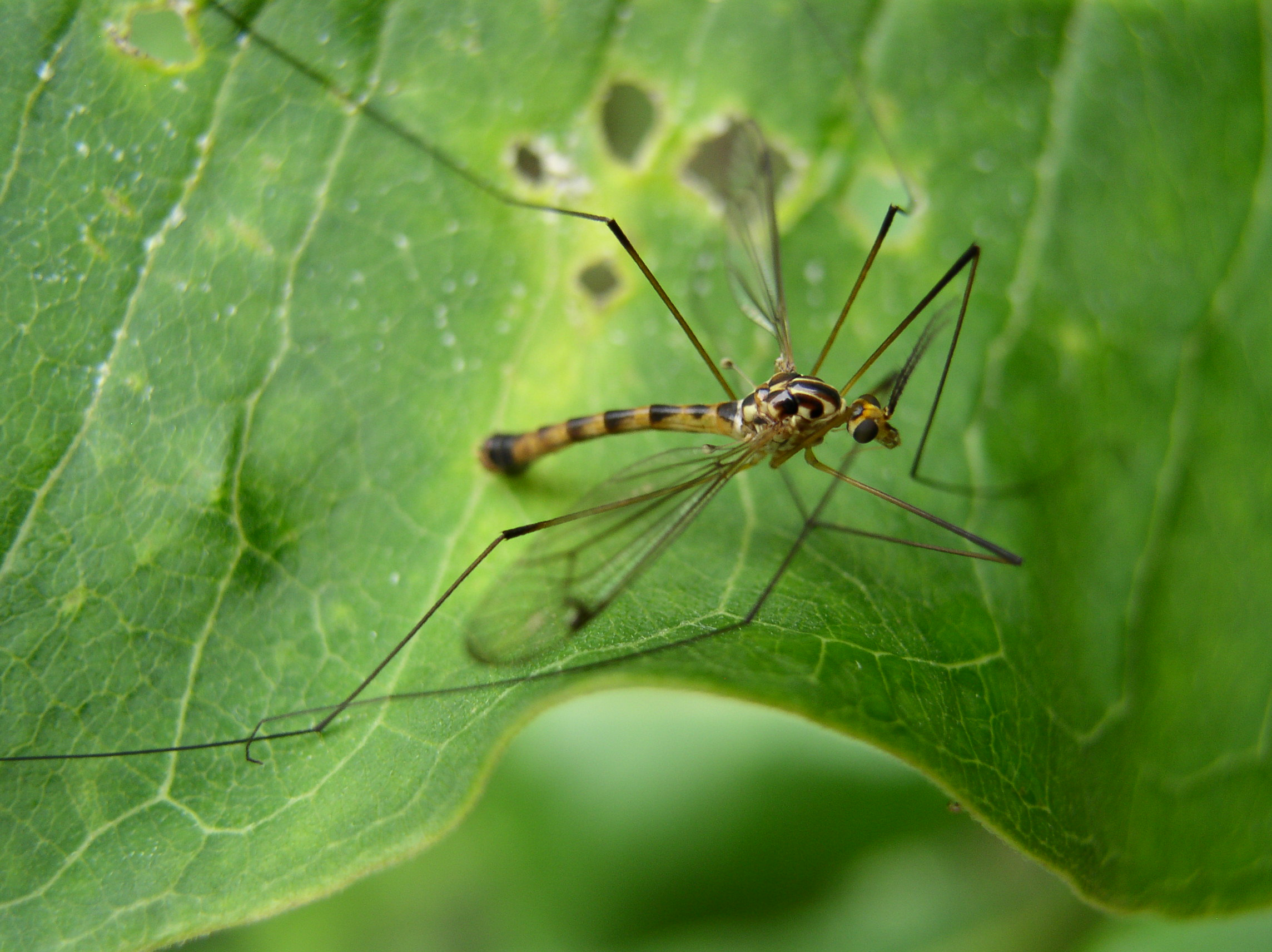
Nephrotoma alterna

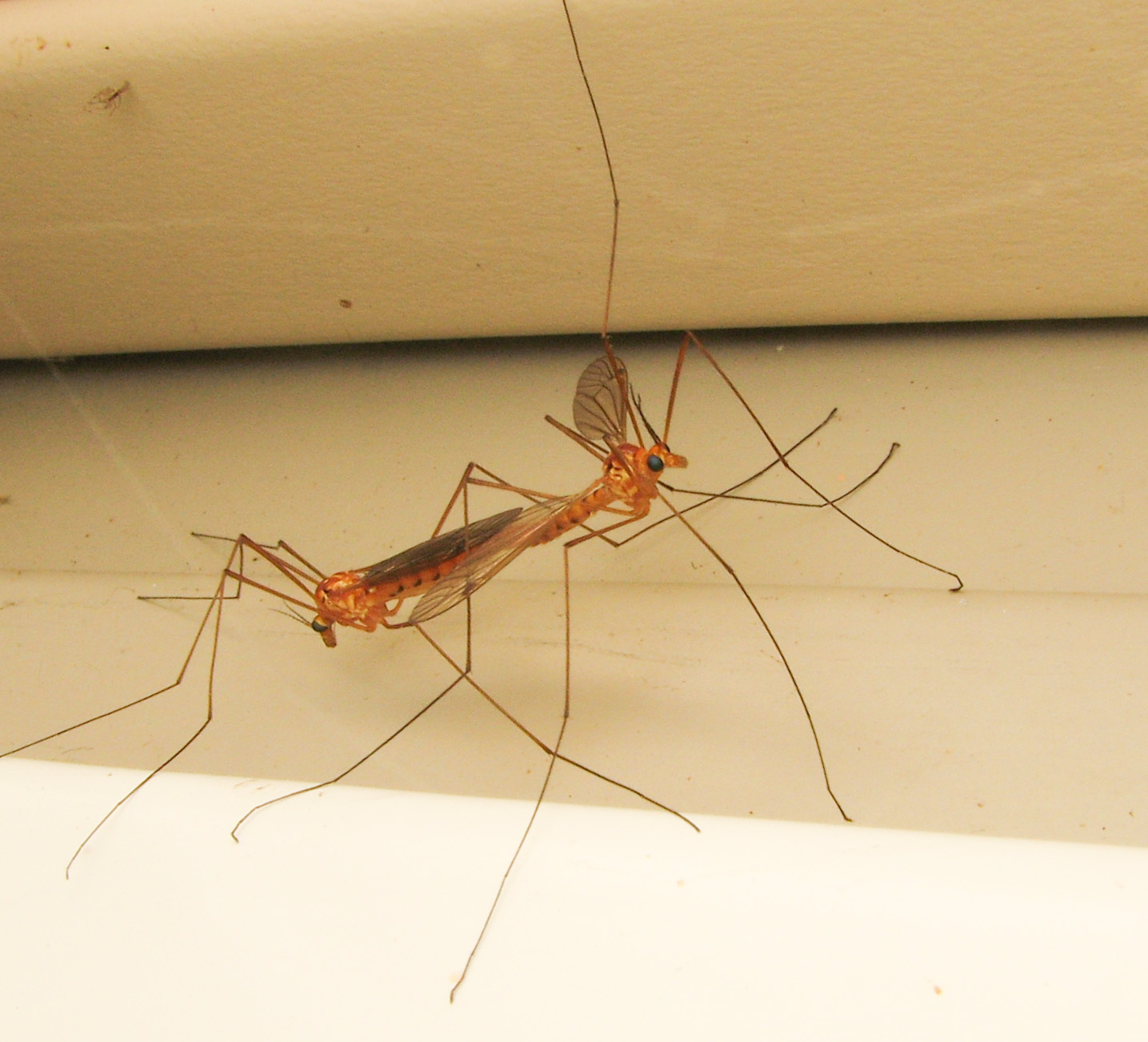
Nephrotoma ferruginea mating

Nephrotoma submaculosa in copula

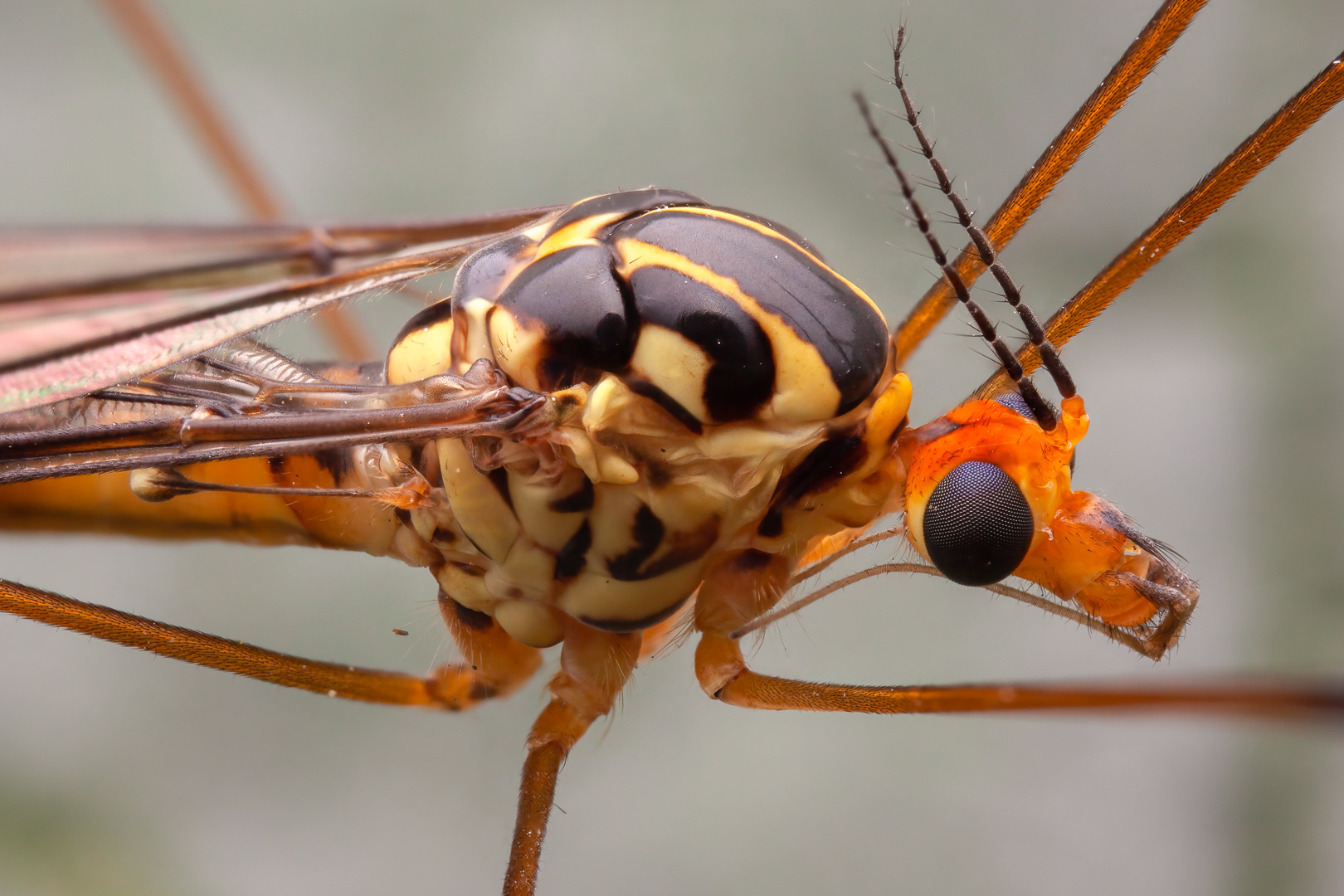
Nephrotoma flavipalpis close-up

Nephrotoma is a genus of crane flies.

For terms see Morphology of Diptera.

Nephrotoma species have a lustrous body, appearing yellow with black or brown stripes and spots. If the body is black, there are coloured bands on the abdomen. The prescutum has three stripes. The proboscis (rostrum) is short and the antennae are verticillate. The subcosta (Sc) fuses with radial vein R slightly distal to the base of the radial sector vein Rs whilst no longer than the mediocubital cross-vein (m-cu). The first media vein termination (m1) is sessile, rarely short and petiolate. The m-cu is located before the base of the discal cell (d). The male genitalia segment Tergite-9 has microscopic black streaks at the apex.

The species are found in deciduous and mixed forests, shrubland and moist meadows.

The larvae live in soil and are sometimes harmful to agricultural crops and ornamental plants.

== Species ==
- N. abbreviata (Loew, 1863)
- N. aberdarensis Alexander, 1956
- N. aculeata (Loew, 1871)
- N. affinis (Bellardi, 1859)
- N. albonigra Alexander, 1921
- N. alexandriana Byers, 1968
- N. alleni (Alexander, 1913)
- N. alluaudi (Pierre, 1922)
- N. alterna (Walker, 1848)
- N. alticrista Alexander, 1941
- N. altigalea Alexander, 1967
- N. altissima (Osten Sacken, 1877)
- N. altrolatera Alexander, 1935
- N. ambricola Alexander, 1963
- N. ampla Alexander, 1921
- N. analis (Schummel, 1833)
- N. angusticrista Alexander, 1962
- N. angustifrons Edwards, 1934
- N. angustistria Alexander, 1925
- N. antennata (Wiedemann, 1820)
- N. antithrix (Mannheims, 1962)
- N. appendiculata (Pierre, 1919)
- N. astigma (Pierre, 1925)
- N. atamoor Alexander, 1960
- N. atrohirsuta Alexander, 1973
- N. atrostyla Alexander, 1935
- N. augustana Alexander, 1973
- N. aurantiaca (Macquart, 1838)
- N. aurantiocincta Alexander, 1941
- N. aurocomata Alexander, 1969
- N. australasiae (Skuse, 1890)
- N. austriaca (Mannheims & Theowald, 1959)
- N. baliana Alexander, 1936
- N. baluba Alexander, 1963
- N. bara Alexander, 1960
- N. barbigera (Savchenko, 1964)
- N. basiflava Yang & Yang, 1991
- N. basutoensis Alexander, 1956
- N. beckeri (Mannheims, 1951)
- N. beibengensis Yang, Liu, Pan, Liu and Yang, 2020
- N. bellula Alexander, 1969
- N. biappendiculata (Savchenko, 1973)
- N. biarmigera Alexander, 1935
- N. bicristata Alexander, 1967
- N. biformis Alexander, 1935
- N. bifusca Alexander, 1920
- N. boliviana Alexander, 1947
- N. bombayensis (Macquart, 1855)
- N. bourbonica Alexander, 1957
- N. boyesi Alexander, 1969
- N. breviorcornis (Doane, 1908)
- N. brevipennis (Wollaston, 1858)
- N. brevisternata Alexander, 1968
- N. buruensis Edwards, 1926
- N. byersi Oosterbroek, 1984
- N. byersina Alexander, 1973
- N. cacuminis Alexander, 1946
- N. calinota (Dietz, 1918)
- N. capensis (Rondani, 1863)
- N. carinata (Mannheims, 1958)
- N. catenata Alexander, 1935
- N. caudifera Alexander, 1935
- N. chaetopyga Alexander, 1921
- N. chalybea Alexander, 1921
- N. chapini Alexander, 1920
- N. chosensis Alexander, 1935
- N. cinereifrons Edwards, 1933
- N. cingulata (Dietz, 1918)
- N. circumcincta Alexander, 1941
- N. circumscripta (Loew, 1863)
- N. cirrata Tangelder, 1984
- N. citreiceps Speiser, 1923
- N. citricolor Alexander, 1949
- N. citrina (Edwards, 1916)
- N. clanceyi Alexander, 1956
- N. claviformis Yang & Yang, 1987
- N. colorata (Walker, 1865)
- N. comoroensis Alexander, 1959
- N. concava Yang & Yang, 1990
- N. concolorithorax (Brunetti, 1912)
- N. condylophora Alexander, 1970
- N. consimilis (Brunetti, 1911)
- N. consularis (Osten Sacken, 1886)
- N. contrasta Alexander, 1920
- N. cornicina (Linnaeus, 1758)
- N. cornifera (Dietz, 1918)
- N. costofumosa Alexander, 1963
- N. cretensis Oosterbroek, 1982
- N. cristiformis Alexander, 1975
- N. crocata (Linnaeus, 1758)
- N. crocea (Loew, 1866)
- N. croceiventris (Strobl, 1909)
- N. cuneata Yang & Yang, 1991
- N. curtiterebra Alexander, 1967
- N. cuthbertsoni Alexander, 1956
- N. dafla Alexander, 1970
- N. daisensis Alexander, 1935
- N. dampfi Alexander, 1925
- N. dawahi Hancock, 2018
- N. definita Alexander, 1935
- N. delegorguei (Macquart, 1846)
- N. delta (Walker, 1856)
- N. dewittei Alexander, 1956
- N. didyma Yang & Yang, 1987
- N. difficilis Tangelder, 1984
- N. dimidiata (de Meijere, 1904)
- N. distans Edwards, 1928
- N. dodabettae Alexander, 1951
- N. dominicana Alexander, 1970
- N. dorsalis (Fabricius, 1781)
- N. dorsata Alexander, 1953
- N. drakanae Alexander, 1936
- N. durangensis Alexander, 1953
- N. dutti Alexander, 1963
- N. eburata (Mannheims, 1958)
- N. ectypa (Speiser, 1908)
- N. edwardsaria Alexander, 1956
- N. edwardsi Alexander, 1917
- N. effrena Alexander, 1936
- N. electripennis Alexander, 1953
- N. elegans (Fabricius, 1805)
- N. elegantula (Williston, 1896)
- N. elgonica Alexander, 1956
- N. erebus Alexander, 1922
- N. ericarum Alexander, 1967
- N. esakii Alexander, 1924
- N. eucera (Loew, 1863)
- N. euceroides Alexander, 1919
- N. euchroma (Mik, 1874)
- N. eugeniae (Savchenko, 1957)
- N. euthynota Alexander, 1962
- N. evittata Alexander, 1935
- N. exastigma Oosterbroek, 1978
- N. excelsior (Bergroth, 1888)
- N. extensicornis Alexander, 1974
- N. familiaris (Osten Sacken, 1881)
- N. fasciata (Macquart, 1834)
- N. ferruginea (Fabricius, 1805)
- N. festiva (Walker, 1848)
- N. flammeola Alexander, 1925
- N. flavescens (Linnaeus, 1758)
- N. flavipalpis (Meigen, 1830)
- N. flavofimbria Alexander, 1976
- N. flavonigra Alexander, 1920
- N. flavonota (Alexander, 1914)
- N. flavoposticata Alexander, 1936
- N. flavoscutellata Edwards, 1925
- N. fletcheriana Alexander, 1952
- N. floresensis Alexander, 1936
- N. fontana Oosterbroek, 1978
- N. forcipata (Pierre, 1919)
- N. formosensis (Edwards, 1916)
- N. freemani Alexander, 1956
- N. fulani Alexander, 1974
- N. fulvomedia Alexander, 1958
- N. fumidapicalis Alexander, 1921
- N. fumiscutellata Alexander, 1935
- N. fuscapex Edwards, 1928
- N. fuscescens (Riedel, 1910)
- N. fuscipennis (Karsch, 1886)
- N. fuscoflava (Brunetti, 1918)
- N. gaganboi Tangelder, 1984
- N. gamma (Brunetti, 1912)
- N. geminata Alexander, 1920
- N. geniculata Yang & Yang, 1987
- N. glabricristata Alexander, 1939
- N. globata Alexander, 1951
- N. globosa Alexander, 1969
- N. glossophora Alexander, 1964
- N. gnata (Dietz, 1918)
- N. gorongozae Alexander, 1960
- N. gracilicornis (Loew, 1864)
- N. graueri Speiser, 1923
- N. guangxiensis Yang & Yang, 1993
- N. guestfalica (Westhoff, 1879)
- N. guttipleura Alexander, 1936
- N. hainanica Alexander, 1936
- N. hamulifera Alexander, 1967
- N. hanae Yang, Liu, Pan, Liu and Yang, 2020
- N. handschiniana Alexander, 1936
- N. helvetica (Mannheims & Theowald, 1959)
- N. hemichroa Alexander, 1956
- N. hirsuticauda Alexander, 1924
- N. huangshanensis Men, Xue and Wang, 2016
- N. hubeiensis Yang & Yang, 1987
- N. hunanensis Yang & Yang, 1991
- N. hypocrites (Brunetti, 1918)
- N. hypogyna Yang & Yang, 1990
- N. idiocera Alexander, 1976
- N. imerina Alexander, 1920
- N. immaculata (van der Wulp, 1891)
- N. impigra Alexander, 1935
- N. inconsequens Alexander, 1936
- N. incristata (Mannheims, 1958)
- N. inorata Alexander, 1951
- N. integra Alexander, 1935
- N. iridipennis (Pierre, 1925)
- N. irrevocata Alexander, 1936
- N. javana (Wiedemann, 1821)
- N. javensis (Doleschall, 1856)
- N. jinxiuensis Yang & Yang, 1993
- N. joneensis Yang & Yang, 1990
- N. kanasensis Ren and Yang, 2017
- N. kaulbacki Alexander, 1951
- N. kaviengensis Alexander, 1936
- N. kelimotoensis Alexander, 1936
- N. kempfi Alexander, 1976
- N. kigeziana Alexander, 1956
- N. kodaikanalensis Alexander, 1951
- N. koreana Tangelder, 1984
- N. korpa Alexander, 1967
- N. kraussiana Alexander, 1978
- N. kunagi Yang & Yang, 1990
- N. laconica (Osten Sacken, 1882)
- N. laffooni Alexander, 1950
- N. lamellata (Riedel, 1910)
- N. lateropolita Alexander, 1938
- N. laticrista Savchenko, 1966
- N. latispina Alexander, 1956
- N. latissima Alexander, 1962
- N. leeuweni Oosterbroek, 1985
- N. lempkei Oosterbroek, 1978
- N. leonia Alexander, 1921
- N. lerothodi Alexander, 1956
- N. leto Alexander, 1956
- N. leucostigma Alexander, 1960
- N. liankangensis Men, Xue and Yang, 2015
- N. libra Alexander, 1951
- N. ligulata Alexander, 1925
- N. lindneriana Alexander, 1978
- N. livingstonei Alexander, 1921
- N. longisternata Alexander, 1967
- N. lordhowensis Dobrotworsky, 1974
- N. luaboensis Alexander, 1960
- N. lucida (Schiner, 1868)
- N. lugens (Loew, 1864)
- N. lundbecki (Nielsen, 1907)
- N. lunulicornis (Schummel, 1833)
- N. luteopleura (Séguy, 1938)
- N. mabelana Alexander, 1976
- N. machadoi Alexander, 1963
- N. macrocera (Say, 1823)
- N. madagascariensis (Enderlein, 1912)
- N. makiella (Matsumura, 1916)
- N. malickyi Martinovsky, 1979
- N. mambila Alexander, 1976
- N. margaritae Alexander, 1970
- N. marshalli Alexander, 1921
- N. martynovi Alexander, 1935
- N. mawdsleyi Boardman, 2020
- N. medioflava Oosterbroek, 1985
- N. medioligula Alexander, 1945
- N. medioproducta Alexander, 1940
- N. medipubera Edwards, 1932
- N. medleri Alexander, 1972
- N. megacantha Alexander, 1976
- N. megascapha Alexander, 1951
- N. melanaspis Alexander, 1970
- N. melanoxantha Alexander, 1962
- N. melanura (Osten Sacken, 1881)
- N. meraca Alexander, 1936
- N. meridionalis Yang & Yang, 1997
- N. metallescens Edwards, 1928
- N. mexicana (Macquart, 1846)
- N. microcera Alexander, 1921
- N. milloti Alexander, 1959
- N. minuscula (Mannheims, 1951)
- N. minuticornis Alexander, 1921
- N. mobukuensis Alexander, 1956
- N. monopsellia Speiser, 1923
- N. moravica Martinovsky, 1971
- N. moshesh Alexander, 1956
- N. mossambica Alexander, 1920
- N. muktesarensis Alexander, 1952
- N. nasuta Oosterbroek, 1975
- N. navajo Alexander, 1949
- N. neopratensis Alexander, 1921
- N. nigeriensis Alexander, 1921
- N. nigricauda Alexander, 1925
- N. nigrichroma (Pierre, 1925)
- N. nigrirostris Edwards, 1928
- N. nigritana (Mannheims, 1958)
- N. nigrithorax (de Meijere, 1919)
- N. nigroannulata (van der Wulp, 1885)
- N. nigrocentralis Alexander, 1938
- N. nigrocostalis Alexander, 1936
- N. nigrohalterata Edwards, 1928
- N. nigrolutea (Bellardi, 1859)
- N. nigropilosa Alexander, 1969
- N. nigrostylata Alexander, 1935
- N. nigrotergata (de Meijere, 1924)
- N. nox (Riedel, 1910)
- N. nycteris Alexander, 1956
- N. occipitalis (Loew, 1864)
- N. ocellata Yang & Yang, 1990
- N. ochripennis Alexander, 1921
- N. okefenoke (Alexander, 1915)
- N. oligochaeta Alexander, 1957
- N. omeiana Alexander, 1935
- N. oosterbroeki Tangelder, 1983
- N. opacistriata Alexander, 1957
- N. opima Alexander, 1924
- N. ordinaria (Osten Sacken, 1886)
- N. ortiva (Osten Sacken, 1882)
- N. ozenumensis Alexander, 1925
- N. pallida Oosterbroek, 1985
- N. pallidapex Alexander, 1938
- N. palloris (Coquillett, 1898)
- N. pamirensis (Enderlein, 1933)
- N. pangerangensis (Alexander, 1915)
- N. parascutellata Alexander, 1936
- N. parva (Edwards, 1916)
- N. parvirostra Alexander, 1924
- N. paulianana Alexander, 1957
- N. pedunculata (Loew, 1863)
- N. penumbra Alexander, 1915
- N. peralticrista Alexander, 1967
- N. perhorrida Alexander, 1942
- N. perincisa Alexander, 1949
- N. perlepida Alexander, 1956
- N. perobliqua Alexander, 1936
- N. petiolata (Macquart, 1838)
- N. pilata Alexander, 1935
- N. pilicauda (Savchenko, 1973)
- N. pjotri Tangelder, 1984
- N. platysphela Alexander, 1963
- N. platysterna Alexander, 1967
- N. pleurinotata (Brunetti, 1912)
- N. pleuromaculata Alexander, 1927
- N. polymera (Loew, 1863)
- N. praecipua Alexander, 1960
- N. pratensis (Linnaeus, 1758)
- N. profunda Alexander, 1935
- N. progne Alexander, 1949
- N. pseudoliankangensis Men, Xue and Yang, 2015
- N. pulchella (Rondani, 1850)
- N. pullata (Alexander, 1914)
- N. puncticornis (Brunetti, 1912)
- N. punctifrons (Macquart, 1838)
- N. punctum (Loew, 1863)
- N. qinghaiensis Yang & Yang, 1987
- N. quadrifaria (Meigen, 1804)
- N. quadrilata Alexander, 1951
- N. quadrinacrea Alexander, 1949
- N. quadristriata (Schummel, 1833)
- N. quadrivittata (van der Wulp, 1885)
- N. quincunx (Speiser, 1909)
- N. rajah Alexander, 1951
- N. ramulifera Tjeder, 1955
- N. rectispina Alexander, 1925
- N. relicta (Savchenko, 1973)
- N. repanda (Alexander, 1914)
- N. retenta Alexander, 1935
- N. reunionensis Alexander, 1957
- N. richardiana Alexander, 1957
- N. ridleyi Edwards, 1932
- N. rogersi Byers, 1968
- N. rossica (Riedel, 1910)
- N. ruanda Alexander, 1955
- N. rubriventris (Savchenko, 1957)
- N. ruiliensis Yang & Yang, 1990
- N. ruwenzoriana Alexander, 1920
- N. saccai (Mannheims, 1951)
- N. sachalina Alexander, 1924
- N. saghaliensis Alexander, 1925
- N. sakalava Alexander, 1960
- N. sangoana Alexander, 1963
- N. scalarifer Alexander, 1920
- N. scalaris (Meigen, 1818)
- N. schaeuffelei (Mannheims, 1964)
- N. scurra (Meigen, 1818)
- N. scurroides (de Meijere, 1904)
- N. semicincta Alexander, 1951
- N. semiflava (Strobl, 1909)
- N. seniana Alexander, 1952
- N. serricornis (Brunetti, 1912)
- N. setirostra Alexander, 1963
- N. shanxiensis Yang & Yang, 1990
- N. siamensis Edwards, 1928
- N. sichuanensis Yang & Yang, 1990
- N. sinensis (Edwards, 1916)
- N. smithersiana Alexander, 1959
- N. sodalis (Loew, 1864)
- N. solomonis Alexander, 1924
- N. sparsicoma Alexander, 1969
- N. spatha Oosterbroek, 1975
- N. speculata (de Meijere, 1913)
- N. spicula Tangelder, 1984
- N. stackelbergi (Savchenko, 1957)
- N. staryi Oosterbroek, 1982
- N. sternomarginata Alexander, 1964
- N. strenua Alexander, 1917
- N. stygia Alexander, 1921
- N. stylacantha Alexander, 1937
- N. subalterna Oosterbroek, 1984
- N. subanalis (Mannheims, 1951)
- N. subdentata Alexander, 1955
- N. subeuryglossa Alexander, 1969
- N. subinanis Alexander, 1956
- N. sublunulicornis (Savchenko, 1957)
- N. submaculosa Edwards, 1928
- N. subopaca Alexander, 1952
- N. subpallida Alexander, 1925
- N. subumbonis Alexander, 1967
- N. sullingtonensis Edwards, 1938
- N. sundaica Edwards, 1932
- N. suturalis (Loew, 1863)
  - N. s. wulpiana(Bergroth, 1865)
- N. takeuchii Alexander, 1924
- N. tealei Oosterbroek, 1984
- N. tenggerensis Alexander, 1936
- N. tenuipes (Riedel, 1910)
- N. tenuis (Loew, 1863)
- N. theowaldi Oosterbroek, 1978
- N. thysia Alexander, 1956
- N. tianlinensis Yang & Yang, 1993
- N. tigrina Alexander, 1917
- N. tigrinoides Alexander, 1921
- N. tincta (Walker, 1856)
- N. toda Alexander, 1951
- N. toxopei Edwards, 1926
- N. tricincta Alexander, 1921
- N. trilobulata Alexander, 1936
- N. triobtusa Alexander, 1969
- N. tripartita (Walker, 1861)
- N. triplasia (van der Wulp, 1885)
- N. triquetra Alexander, 1956
- N. tumidiverticalis Alexander, 1930
- N. tzitzikamae Alexander, 1964
- N. umbonis Alexander, 1964
- N. umbripennis Alexander, 1917
- N. unicingulata Alexander, 1917
- N. unicornis Alexander, 1961
- N. unisicata Alexander, 1969
- N. urocera (Dietz, 1918)
- N. usta (Osten Sacken, 1886)
- N. vana nigrovana Oosterbroek, 1985
- N. vana vana Oosterbroek, 1985
- N. variventris Edwards, 1932
- N. venusticeps Alexander, 1956
- N. vesta Alexander, 1949
- N. vicaria (Walker, 1848)
- N. villosa (Savchenko, 1973)
- N. vinsoniana Alexander, 1957
- N. violovitshi (Savchenko, 1967)
- N. virescens (Loew, 1864)
- N. virgata (Coquillett, 1898)
- N. vittula (Loew, 1864)
- N. walkeri Oosterbroek, 1986
- N. whiteheadi Edwards, 1933
- N. xanthoplaca Alexander, 1920
- N. xanthoplacodes Alexander, 1963
- N. xichangensis Yang & Yang, 1990
- N. xinjiangensis Yang & Yang, 1987
- N. xizangensis Yang & Yang, 1987
- N. zhejiangensis Yang & Yang, 1995
