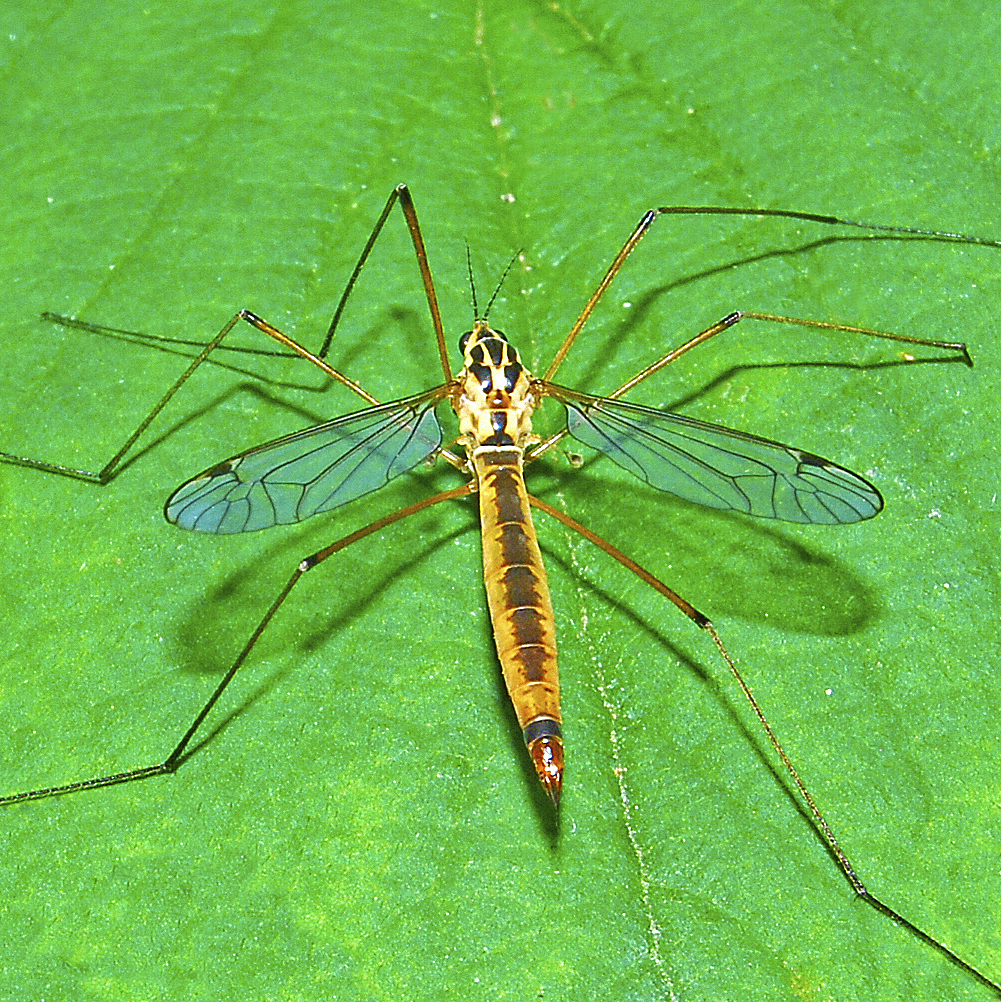
- Nephrotoma cornicina, female with ovipositor

Scientific classification
- Kingdom: Animalia
- Phylum: Arthropoda
- Class: Insecta
- Order: Diptera
- Family: Tipulidae
- Genus: Nephrotoma
- Species: N. cornicina

Binomial name
- Nephrotoma cornicina (Linnaeus, 1758)

Synonyms
- Nephrotoma flavomaculata (De Geer, 1776); Nephrotoma iridicolor (Schummel, 1833); Nephrotoma nigrina Savchenko, 1973; Nephrotoma petiolata (Zetterstedt, 1838); Nephrotoma sannio (Meigen, 1838)

= Nephrotoma cornicina =

Species of fly

Nephrotoma cornicina is a species of fly in the family Tipulidae.

== Subspecies ==
Subspecies include:

- Nephrotoma cornicina cornicina (Linnaeus, 1758)
- Nephrotoma cornicina sardiniensis Oosterbroek, 1978 (Sardinia)

== Distribution ==
This species is widely distributed in the Palearctic realm. It can be found in most of Europe (Albania, Andorra, Austria, Belarus, Belgium, Bosnia-Herzegovina, Bulgaria, Croatia, Czech Republic, Denmark, Estonia, Finland, France, Germany, Great Britain, Greece, Hungary, Ireland, Italy, Latvia, Lithuania, Luxembourg, Malta, Montenegro, Netherlands, North Macedonia, Norway, Poland, Portugal, Romania, Serbia, Slovakia, Slovenia, Spain, Sweden, Switzerland, Ukraine), in the European Russia, in Kazakhstan, Turkmenistan, Uzbekistan, Tajikistan, Kyrgyzstan, Afghanistan, Mongolia, Japan, China, India, Pakistan, in the Nearctic realm (Canada, United States), and in the Near East (Georgia, Armenia, Azerbaijan, Turkey, Cyprus, Lebanon, Israel, Iran).

== Habitat ==
These flies mainly inhabit turf grass and hedge rows.

== Description ==
Nephrotoma cornicina can reach a body length of 12–15 millimetres (0.47–0.59 in) and a wing length of 11–15 millimetres (0.43–0.59 in). On the wings the stigma is quite small, brown or black, clearly distinct. These flies have slender-bodies, with elongate an rather narrow wings and very long and slender legs. Ocelli are absent and the occipital mark is black. Flagellum is entirely black. Abdomen is mainly yellow, with a dark median stripe, sometimes absent on tergites 6 and 7. In males sternite 8 shows a straight rather long appendage directed at caudal margin. Tergite 9 is short and rather broad, swollen and rounded towards sides. The females have a pointed shiny brown ovipositor with a black basal half, for laying eggs into the ground.

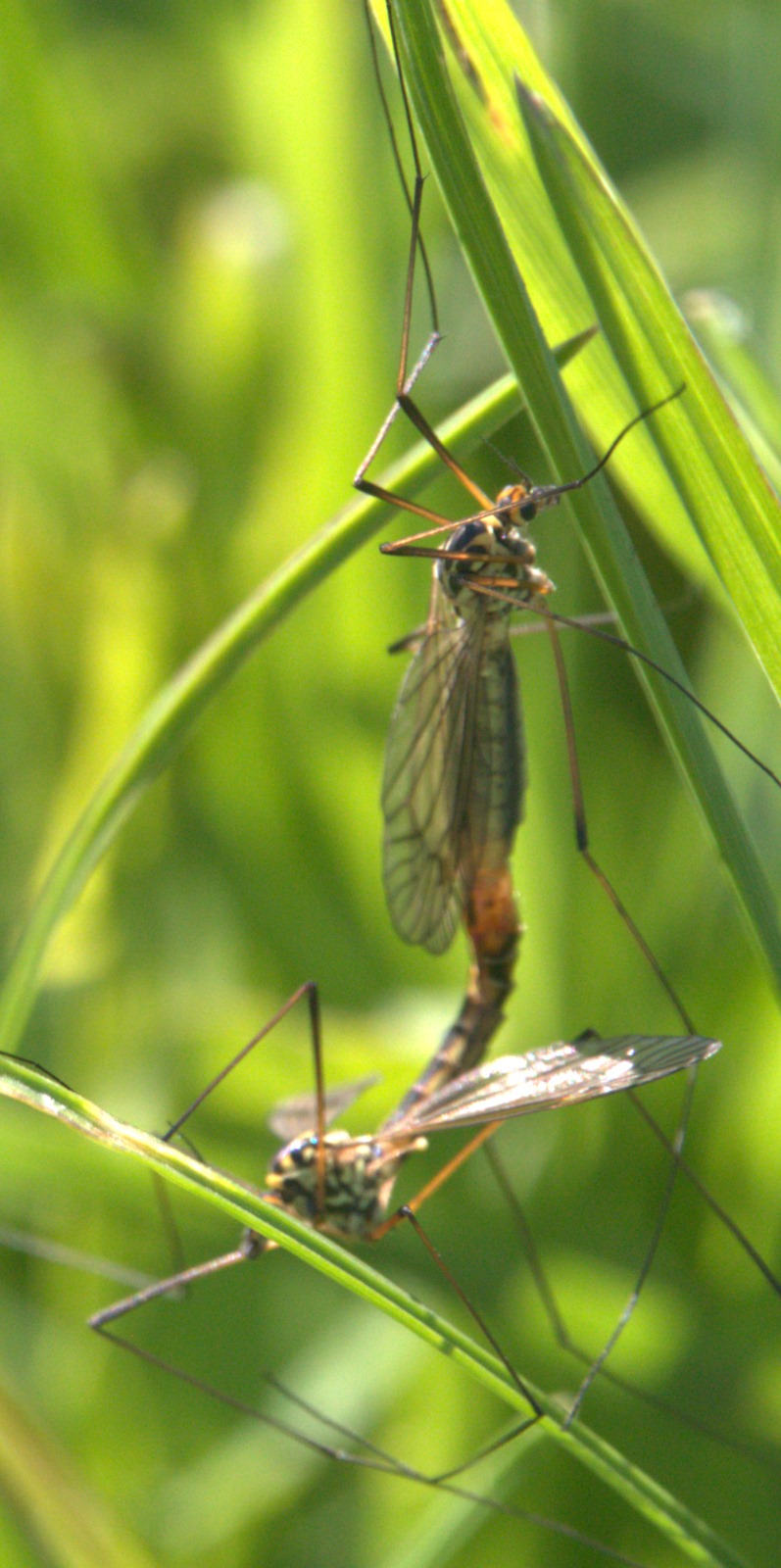
Nephrotoma cornicina mating

== Biology ==
Adults can be found from late April to mid-September. They feed on nectar of Taraxacum officinale and Anthriscus sylvestris.
