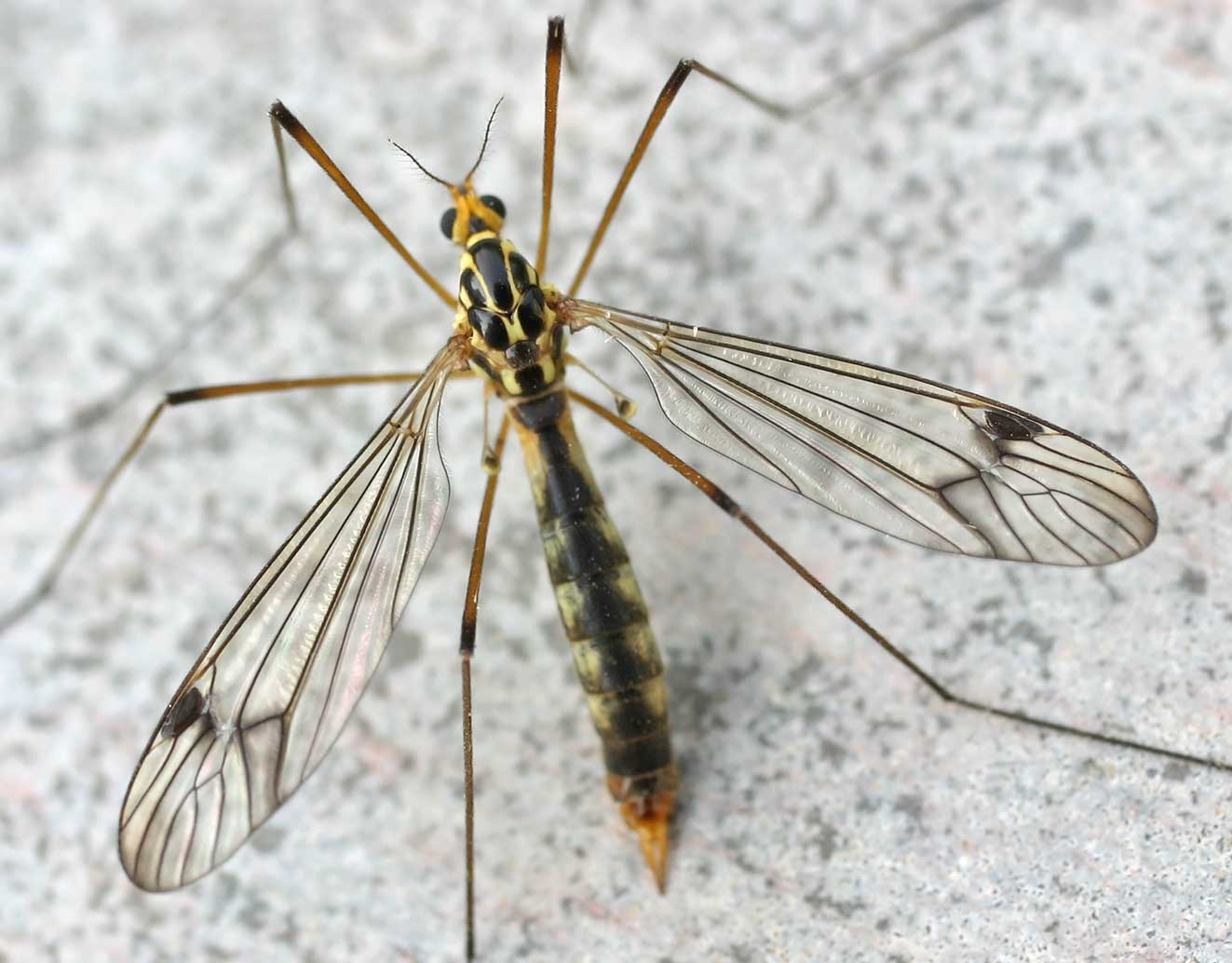

Scientific classification
- Kingdom: Animalia
- Phylum: Arthropoda
- Class: Insecta
- Order: Diptera
- Family: Tipulidae
- Genus: Nephrotoma
- Species: N. quadrifaria

Binomial name
- Nephrotoma quadrifaria (Meigen, 1804)

Synonyms
- Tipula quadrifaria Meigen, 1804; Tipula dentata Meigen, 1838; Pachyrhina fascipennis (Zetterstedt, 1851); Nephrotoma dentata (Meigen, 1838); Nephrotoma fascipennis (Zetterstedt, 1851)

= Nephrotoma quadrifaria =

Species of fly

Nephrotoma quadrifaria, also known as the four-spotted cranefly, is a species of true cranefly found in most of Europe and Great Britain. The subspecies N. q. farsidica is found in Iran.

== Subspecies ==
- N. q. farsidica (Savchenko, 1957)
- N. q. quadrifaria (Meigen, 1804)
