= Nephrotoma byersi =

Scientific classification
- Kingdom: Animalia
- Phylum: Arthropoda
- Class: Insecta
- Order: Diptera
- Family: Tipulidae
- Genus: Nephrotoma
- Species: N. byersi

Binomial name
- Nephrotoma byersi Oosterbroek, 1984

Species of fly

Nephrotoma byersi is a species of large crane fly in the family Tipulidae.
