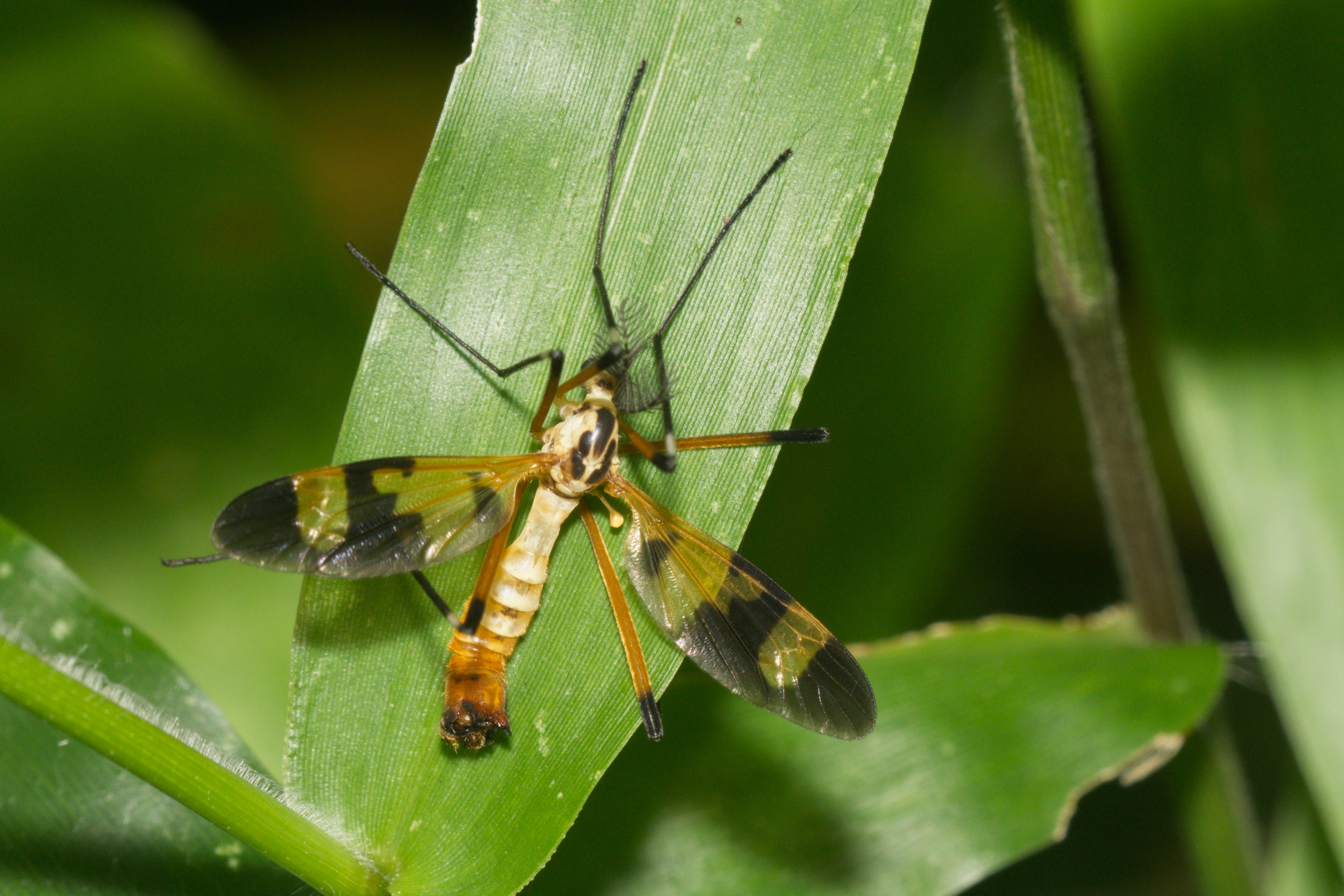
- Pselliophora laeta, male

Scientific classification
- Domain: Eukaryota
- Kingdom: Animalia
- Phylum: Arthropoda
- Class: Insecta
- Order: Diptera
- Family: Tipulidae
- Subfamily: Ctenophorinae
- Genus: Pselliophora; Osten Sacken, 1887

Type species
- Tipula laeta Fabricius, 1794

Species
- See text

= Pselliophora =

Genus of flies

Pselliophora is a genus of true crane fly.

== Species ==
- P. annulipes Enderlein, 1921
- P. annulosa (van der Wulp, 1884)
- P. approximata Brunetti, 1918
- P. ardens (Wiedemann, 1821)
- P. aurantia Brunetti, 1918
- P. bakeri Alexander, 1925
- P. biaurantia Alexander, 1938
- P. bicinctifer Alexander, 1922
- P. bicolor Edwards, 1925
- P. bifascipennis Brunetti, 1911
- P. binghami Edwards, 1921
- P. brunnipennis Edwards, 1926
- P. cavaleriei Alexander, 1923
- P. chaseni Edwards, 1932
- P. chrysophila (Walker, 1856)
- P. compedita (Wiedemann, 1821)
- P. ctenophorina Riedel, 1913
- P. curvipes van der Wulp, 1884
- P. dendrobia Edwards, 1932
- P. divisa Brunetti, 1911
- P. dolens (Osten Sacken, 1882)
- P. enderleini (Alexander & Alexander, 1973)
- P. fasciipennis Enderlein, 1921
- P. flammipes Edwards, 1926
- P. flavibasis Edwards, 1916
- P. flavifemur Enderlein, 1921
- P. flavofasciata Brunetti, 1918
- P. flavostigma Alexander, 1924
- P. fumiplena (Walker, 1856)
- P. fuscipennis (Macquart, 1846)
- P. fuscolimbata Alexander, 1938
- P. galeata Alexander, 1921
- P. gaudens (Walker, 1859)
- P. gloria Alexander, 1924
- P. guangxiensis Yang & Yang, 1988
- P. hainanensis Yang & Yang, 1988
- P. harmandi Alexander, 1924
- P. henryi Edwards, 1927
- P. hoffmanni Alexander, 1932
- P. hoppo Matsumura, 1916
- P. idalia (Osten Sacken, 1882)
- P. igorota Alexander, 1923
- P. immaculipennis Brunetti, 1911
- P. incunctans (Walker, 1859)
- P. insignis de Meijere, 1904
- P. invenustipes Alexander, 1932
- P. isshikii (Matsumura, 1916)
- P. jinxiuensis Yang & Yang, 1988
- P. jubilata Alexander, 1938
- P. kangeanensis Alexander, 1938
- P. kershawi Alexander, 1923
- P. koreana Masaki, 1939
- P. ladelli Edwards, 1932
- P. laeta (Fabricius, 1794)
- P. laneipes Edwards, 1921
- P. latifascipennis Brunetti, 1918
- P. lauta Alexander, 1936
- P. longicornis de Meijere, 1924
- P. longshengensis Yang & Yang, 1988
- P. luctuosa de Meijere, 1916
- P. margarita (Alexander, 1965)
- P. mcgregori Alexander, 1925
- P. mecocera (Alexander, 1970)
- P. mesamericana Alexander, 1944
- P. nigribasis Edwards, 1921
- P. nigrithorax van der Wulp, 1904
- P. nigrorum Alexander, 1929
- P. ningmingensis Yang & Yang, 1988
- P. ophionea Edwards, 1921
- P. pachyrhinoides Edwards, 1932
- P. pallitibia Yang & Yang, 1988
- P. pendleburyi Edwards, 1928
- P. penicillata Edwards, 1928
- P. perdecora Alexander, 1922
- P. plagiata Edwards, 1926
- P. praefica Bezzi, 1916
- P. pumila Alexander, 1922
- P. reversa Edwards, 1921
- P. rubella Edwards, 1923
- P. rubra Osten Sacken, 1887
- P. scalator Alexander, 1920
- P. scurra Alexander, 1941
- P. sikkimensis Enderlein, 1921
- P. speciosa Edwards, 1916
- P. stabilis Alexander, 1936
- P. sternoloba Alexander, 1938
- P. stigmatica van der Wulp, 1904
- P. strigipennis de Meijere, 1914
- P. suspirans (Osten Sacken, 1882)
- P. taprobanes (Walker, 1848)
- P. terminalis Brunetti, 1911
- P. tigriventris Alexander, 1925
- P. tinctipennis Edwards, 1932
- P. tripudians Bezzi, 1916
- P. upsilon Alexander, 1938
- P. venezuelensis Alexander, 1944
- P. vulcan Alexander, 1923
- P. xanthopimplina Enderlein, 1921
