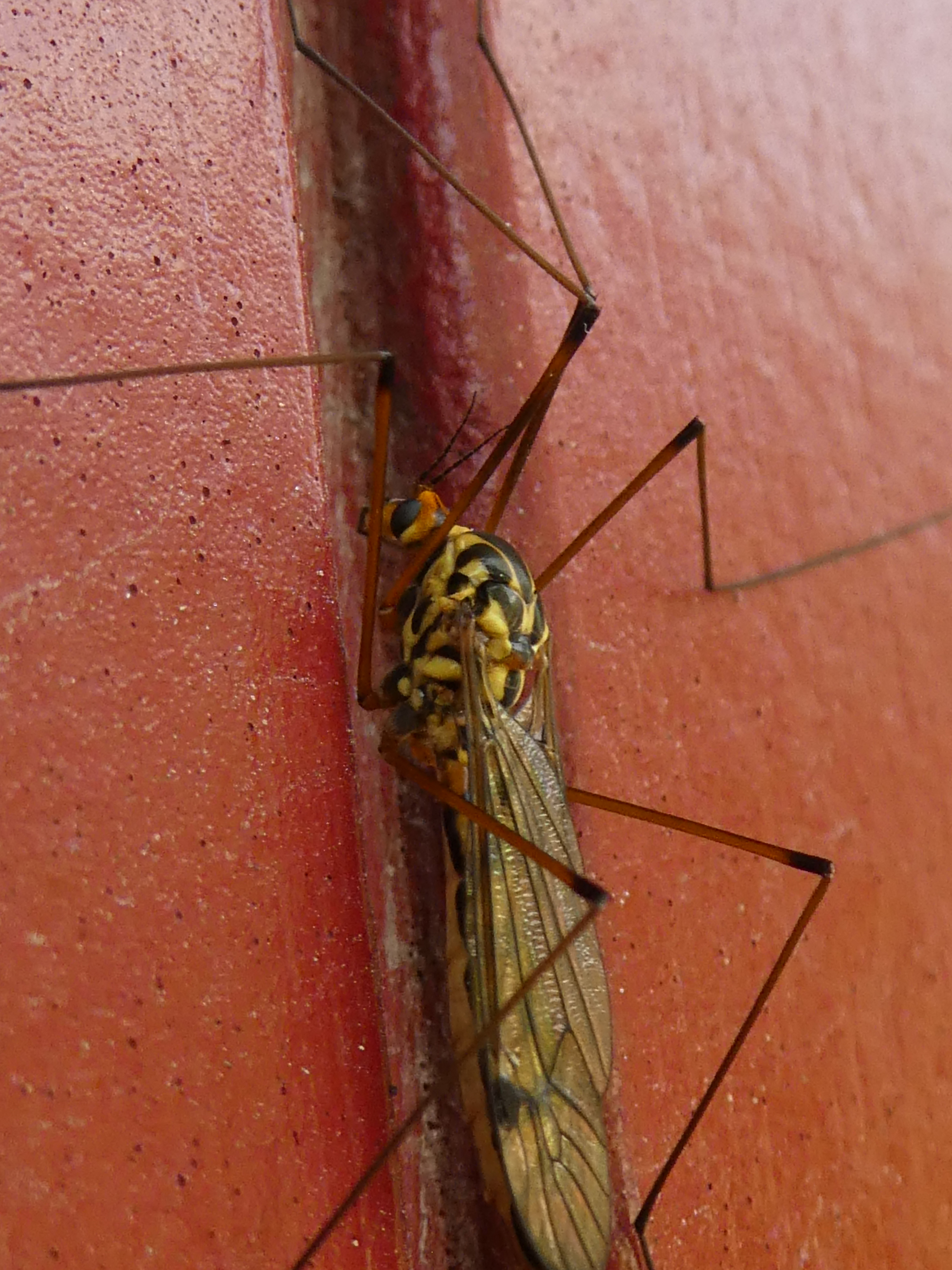

Scientific classification
- Kingdom: Animalia
- Phylum: Arthropoda
- Class: Insecta
- Order: Diptera
- Family: Tipulidae
- Genus: Nephrotoma
- Species: N. scalaris

Binomial name
- Nephrotoma scalaris Meigen, 1818

= Nephrotoma scalaris =

Species of crane fly

Nephrotoma scalaris is a species of crane fly in the genus Nephrotoma. It was described in 1818.

== Taxonomy ==
Nephrotoma scalaris contains the following subspecies:

- Nephrotoma scalaris parvinotata
