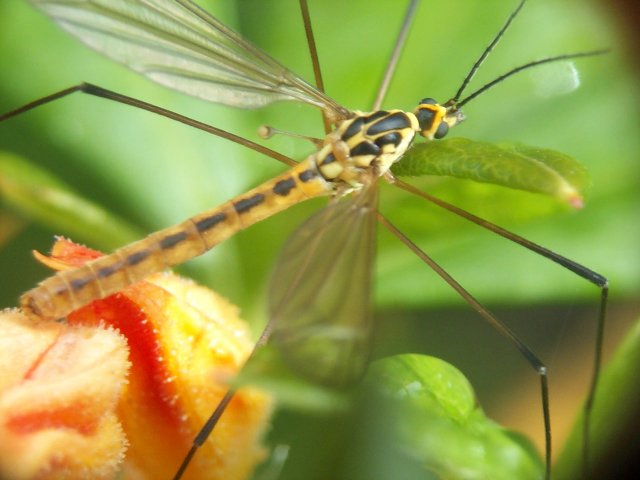
- Nephrotoma flavescens

Scientific classification
- Kingdom: Animalia
- Phylum: Arthropoda
- Clade: Pancrustacea
- Class: Insecta
- Order: Diptera
- Family: Tipulidae
- Genus: Nephrotoma
- Species: N. flavescens

Binomial name
- Nephrotoma flavescens (Linnaeus, 1758)

= Nephrotoma flavescens =

Species of fly

Nephrotoma flavescens is a species of fly in the family Tipulidae. It is found in the Palearctic.
