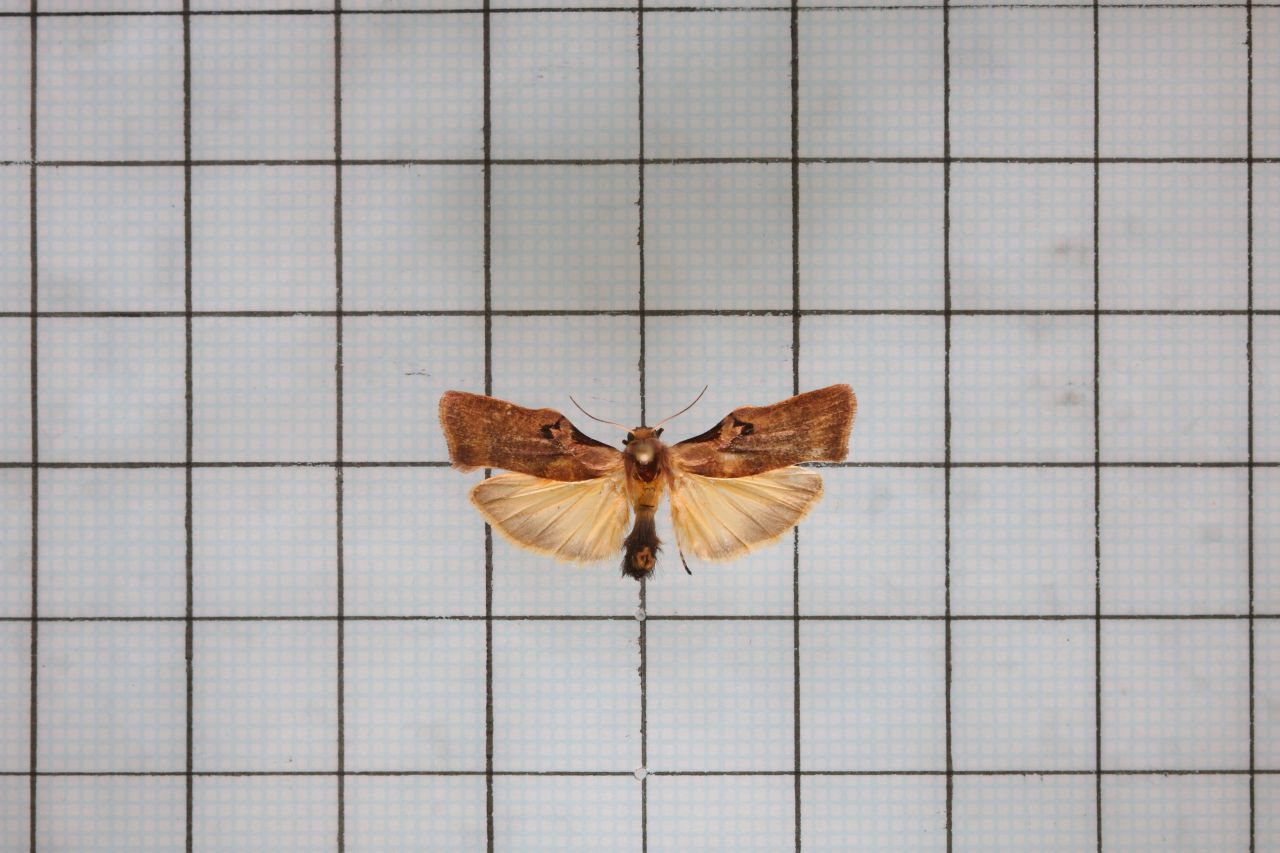
- Teulisna tumida

Scientific classification
- Kingdom: Animalia
- Phylum: Arthropoda
- Clade: Pancrustacea
- Class: Insecta
- Order: Lepidoptera
- Superfamily: Noctuoidea
- Family: Erebidae
- Subfamily: Arctiinae
- Subtribe: Lithosiina
- Genus: Teulisna; Walker, 1862

Synonyms
- List: Corcura Walker, 1862; Cossa Walker, 1865; Diastrophia Felder, 1874; Ityca Walker, 1866; Tegulata Walker, 1862; Thysanoptyx Hampson, 1894 (disputed); Bitecta Heylaerts, 1891 (disputed); Lophoneura Hampson, 1894

= Teulisna =

Genus of moths

Teulisna is a genus of moths in the family Erebidae. The genus was erected by Francis Walker in 1862. They are found in Sri Lanka, India, Myanmar, Borneo and Java.

== Description ==
Palpi short, porrect (extending forward) and hairy. Antennae of male with short cilia and bristles. Forewings are triangular with acute apex and erect outer margin. A fringe of long scales in the basal part of the cell on upperside. Veins 3 and 4 stalked and vein 5 absent. Veins 6 to 9 stalked, veins 10 from cell. Areole absent. Vein 11 anastomosing (fusing) with vein 12. Male with the bent median nervure and narrow cell outer part. Neuration somewhat distorted. Hindwing with veins 3, 4 and 6, 7 stalked and vein 5 absent. Vein 8 from middle of cell. Male with a patch of modified scales at base of median nervure. The cell short and discocellulars oblique.

== Species ==
- Teulisna atratella (Walker, 1864)
- Teulisna basigera (Walker, 1865)
- Teulisna bertha Butler, 1877
- Teulisna bipectinis Fang, 2000
- Teulisna bipunctata (Walker, 1866)
- Teulisna chiloides Walker, 1862
- Teulisna curviplaga (Rothschild, 1912)
- Teulisna divisa (Walker, 1862)
- Teulisna harmani Holloway, 2001
- Teulisna macropallida Holloway, 2001
- Teulisna montanebulosa Holloway, 2001
- Teulisna murina (Heylaerts, 1891)
- Teulisna nebulosa (Walker, 1862)
- Teulisna nigricauda Holloway, 1982
- Teulisna obliquistria Hampson, 1894
- Teulisna pallidicauda Holloway, 2001
- Teulisna perdentata (Druce, 1899)
- Teulisna plagiata Walker, 1862
- Teulisna pseudochiloides Holloway, 2001
- Teulisna quadratella Holloway, 2001
- Teulisna reflexa Holloway, 2001
- Teulisna ruptifascia (Talbot, 1926)
- Teulisna semibrunnea Heylaerts, 1891
- Teulisna setiniformis (Hampson, 1900)
- Teulisna steineri Holloway, 2001
- Teulisna tricornuta Holloway, 2001
- Teulisna tumida (Walker, 1862)
- Teulisna uniformis (Hampson, 1894)
- Teulisna uniplaga Hampson, 1894

== Former species ==
- Teulisna tetragona (Walker, 1854)
