= Dolgoma =

Scientific classification
- Domain: Eukaryota
- Kingdom: Animalia
- Phylum: Arthropoda
- Class: Insecta
- Order: Lepidoptera
- Superfamily: Noctuoidea
- Family: Erebidae
- Subfamily: Arctiinae
- Subtribe: Lithosiina
- Genus: Dolgoma; Moore, 1878

Genus of moths

Dolgoma is a genus of moths in the family Erebidae. The genus was erected by Frederic Moore in 1878.

Most species were previously placed in the genus Eilema.

== Species ==
- Dolgoma angulifera (Felder, 1868) (India, Thailand)
- Dolgoma cribrata (Staudinger, 1887) (eastern Asia)
- Dolgoma diktyo Volynkin & Černý, 2021
- Dolgoma fukienica (Daniel, 1954) (south-eastern China)
- Dolgoma kawila Volynkin & Černý, 2021
- Dolgoma khelanga Volynkin & Černý, 2021
- Dolgoma locus (Bucsek, 2012)
- Dolgoma lucida (Fang, 2000) (south-western China)
- Dolgoma nigrocribrata Dubatolov, Kishida & M. Wang, 2012
- Dolgoma oblitterans (Felder, 1868) (Himalayas to Yunnan)
- Dolgoma ovalis Fang, 2000 (China: Shaanxi)
- Dolgoma recta Černý, 2009 (Thailand)
- Dolgoma reticulata Moore, 1878 (Himalayas)
- Dolgoma rectoides Dubatolov, 2012
- Dolgoma steineri (Holloway, 2001)
- Dolgoma striata Dubatolov, 2012
- Dolgoma striola Dubatolov, Kishida & M. Wang, 2012
- Dolgoma xanthocraspis (Hampson, 1900) (eastern India, southern and central China)
- Dolgoma xanthoma Singh, Kirti, Datta & Volynkin, 2019

== Selected former species ==
- Dolgoma klapperichi is now Wittia klapperichi (Daniel, 1954) (southern China)
- Dolgoma perdentata is now Teulisna perdentata (H. Druce, 1899) (south-western China, Malakka)

== Notes ==
- Dubatolov, Vladimir V.; Kishida, Yasunori; Wang, Min (May 2012). "New records of lichen-moths from the Nanling Mts., Guangdong, South China, with descriptions of new genera and species (Lepidoptera, Arctiidae: Lithosiinae)". Tinea. 22 (1): 25–52. S2CID 86037229.
- Dubatolov, V. V.; Kishida, Y. & Wang, M., 2012: Dolgoma striola sp. nov. a new species of lichen moths from the Nanling mountains (Guangdong, China) (Lepidoptera, Arctiidae: Lithosiinae). Amurian Zoological Journal 4 (3): 274–276. Full article: .
- Dubatolov, V. V. (2012). "New genus, species and faunistic records of lichen-moths (Lepidoptera, Arctiidae, Lithosiinae) from Vietnam" (PDF). Euroasian Entomological Journal. 11 (6): 507–512, 506, III.
- Singh, Navneet; Kirti, Jagbir Singh; Datta, Harvinder Singh; Joshi, Rahul; Volynkin, Anton V. (7 October 2019). "A review of the genus Dolgoma Moore from India, with notes on the genus taxonomy and descriptions of a new genus, four new species and a new subspecies (Lepidoptera, Erebidae, Arctiinae, Lithosiini)". Zootaxa. 4683 (1): 33–54. doi:10.11646/zootaxa.4683.1.2.
- Volynkin, Anton V.; Černý, Karel (1 November 2021). "Taxonomic review of the genus Dolgoma Moore (Lepidoptera: Erebidae: Arctiinae) from Thailand with descriptions of three new species". Zootaxa. 5060 (3): 417–428. doi:10.11646/zootaxa.5060.3.7.
