= Dolgoma angulifera =

Scientific classification
- Domain: Eukaryota
- Kingdom: Animalia
- Phylum: Arthropoda
- Class: Insecta
- Order: Lepidoptera
- Superfamily: Noctuoidea
- Family: Erebidae
- Subfamily: Arctiinae
- Genus: Dolgoma
- Species: D. angulifera

Binomial name
- Dolgoma angulifera (Felder, 1868)

Synonyms
- Lithosia angulifera Felder, 1874; Eilema angulifera

Species of moth

Dolgoma angulifera is a moth of the family Erebidae first described by Felder in 1868. It is found in India, Sri Lanka and Thailand.

== Description ==
Its wingspan is about 29 mm. Forewing with vein 9 stalked with veins 7 and 8. Forewing with the outer margin of moderate length. Male lack secondary sexual characters on the forewing. In female, head, thorax and forewings are bright ochreous on color without irroration. Hindwings are pale yellowish.

== Taxonomy ==
It is sometimes listed as a synonym of Dolgoma oblitterans.
