= Teulisna divisa =

Scientific classification
- Kingdom: Animalia
- Phylum: Arthropoda
- Class: Insecta
- Order: Lepidoptera
- Superfamily: Noctuoidea
- Family: Erebidae
- Subfamily: Arctiinae
- Genus: Teulisna
- Species: T. divisa

Binomial name
- Teulisna divisa (Walker, 1862)

Synonyms
- Hypoprepia divisa Walker, 1862

Species of moth

Teulisna divisa is a moth in the family Erebidae. It was described by Francis Walker in 1862. It is found on Borneo.
