= Teulisna bipunctata =

Scientific classification
- Kingdom: Animalia
- Phylum: Arthropoda
- Class: Insecta
- Order: Lepidoptera
- Superfamily: Noctuoidea
- Family: Erebidae
- Subfamily: Arctiinae
- Genus: Teulisna
- Species: T. bipunctata

Binomial name
- Teulisna bipunctata (Walker, 1866)

Synonyms
- Lithosia bipunctata Walker, 1866; Corcura mysolica Swinhoe, 1892; Ilema dinawa Bethune-Baker, 1904

Species of moth

Teulisna bipunctata is a moth of the family Erebidae first described by Francis Walker in 1866. It is found on the Moluccas and in Papua New Guinea and Queensland, Australia.
