= Dolgoma striata =

Scientific classification
- Domain: Eukaryota
- Kingdom: Animalia
- Phylum: Arthropoda
- Class: Insecta
- Order: Lepidoptera
- Superfamily: Noctuoidea
- Family: Erebidae
- Subfamily: Arctiinae
- Genus: Dolgoma
- Species: D. striata

Binomial name
- Dolgoma striata Dubatolov, 2012

Species of moth

Dolgoma striata is a moth of the family Erebidae. It was described by Vladimir Viktorovitch Dubatolov in 2012 and is endemic to Vietnam.
