= Teulisna uniformis =

Scientific classification
- Kingdom: Animalia
- Phylum: Arthropoda
- Class: Insecta
- Order: Lepidoptera
- Superfamily: Noctuoidea
- Family: Erebidae
- Subfamily: Arctiinae
- Genus: Teulisna
- Species: T. uniformis

Binomial name
- Teulisna uniformis (Hampson, 1894)

Synonyms
- Lophoneura uniformis Hampson, 1894

Species of moth

Teulisna uniformis is a moth in the family Erebidae. It was described by George Hampson in 1894. It is found in Myanmar.
