= Teulisna macropallida =

Scientific classification
- Kingdom: Animalia
- Phylum: Arthropoda
- Clade: Pancrustacea
- Class: Insecta
- Order: Lepidoptera
- Superfamily: Noctuoidea
- Family: Erebidae
- Subfamily: Arctiinae
- Genus: Teulisna
- Species: T. macropallida

Binomial name
- Teulisna macropallida Holloway, 2001

Species of moth

Teulisna macropallida is a moth in the family Erebidae. It was described by Jeremy Daniel Holloway in 2001. It is found on Borneo. The habitat consists of upper montane forests.

The length of the forewings is about 16 mm for males and 15–16 mm for females.
