= Teulisna bertha =

Scientific classification
- Domain: Eukaryota
- Kingdom: Animalia
- Phylum: Arthropoda
- Class: Insecta
- Order: Lepidoptera
- Superfamily: Noctuoidea
- Family: Erebidae
- Subfamily: Arctiinae
- Genus: Teulisna
- Species: T. bertha

Binomial name
- Teulisna bertha Butler, 1877

Species of moth

Teulisna bertha is a moth in the family Erebidae. It was described by Arthur Gardiner Butler in 1877. It is found on Java and Bali.
