= Bitecta =

Scientific classification
- Domain: Eukaryota
- Kingdom: Animalia
- Phylum: Arthropoda
- Class: Insecta
- Order: Lepidoptera
- Superfamily: Noctuoidea
- Family: Erebidae
- Subfamily: Arctiinae
- Tribe: Lithosiini
- Genus: Bitecta; Heylaerts, 1891

Genus of moths

Bitecta is a genus of moths in the subfamily Arctiinae. It is considered a synonym of Teulisna by some authors.

== Species ==
If the genus is accepted, it consists of at least the following species:

- Bitecta diastropha Rothschild, 1920
- Bitecta flaveola Rothschild, 1912
- Bitecta murina Heylaerts, 1891
- Bitecta xanthura Rothschild, 1920
