= Teulisna reflexa =

Scientific classification
- Kingdom: Animalia
- Phylum: Arthropoda
- Clade: Pancrustacea
- Class: Insecta
- Order: Lepidoptera
- Superfamily: Noctuoidea
- Family: Erebidae
- Subfamily: Arctiinae
- Genus: Teulisna
- Species: T. reflexa

Binomial name
- Teulisna reflexa Holloway, 2001

Species of moth

Teulisna reflexa is a moth in the family Erebidae. It was described by Jeremy Daniel Holloway in 2001. It is found on Borneo. The habitat consists of montane areas.

The length of the forewings is about 12 mm.
