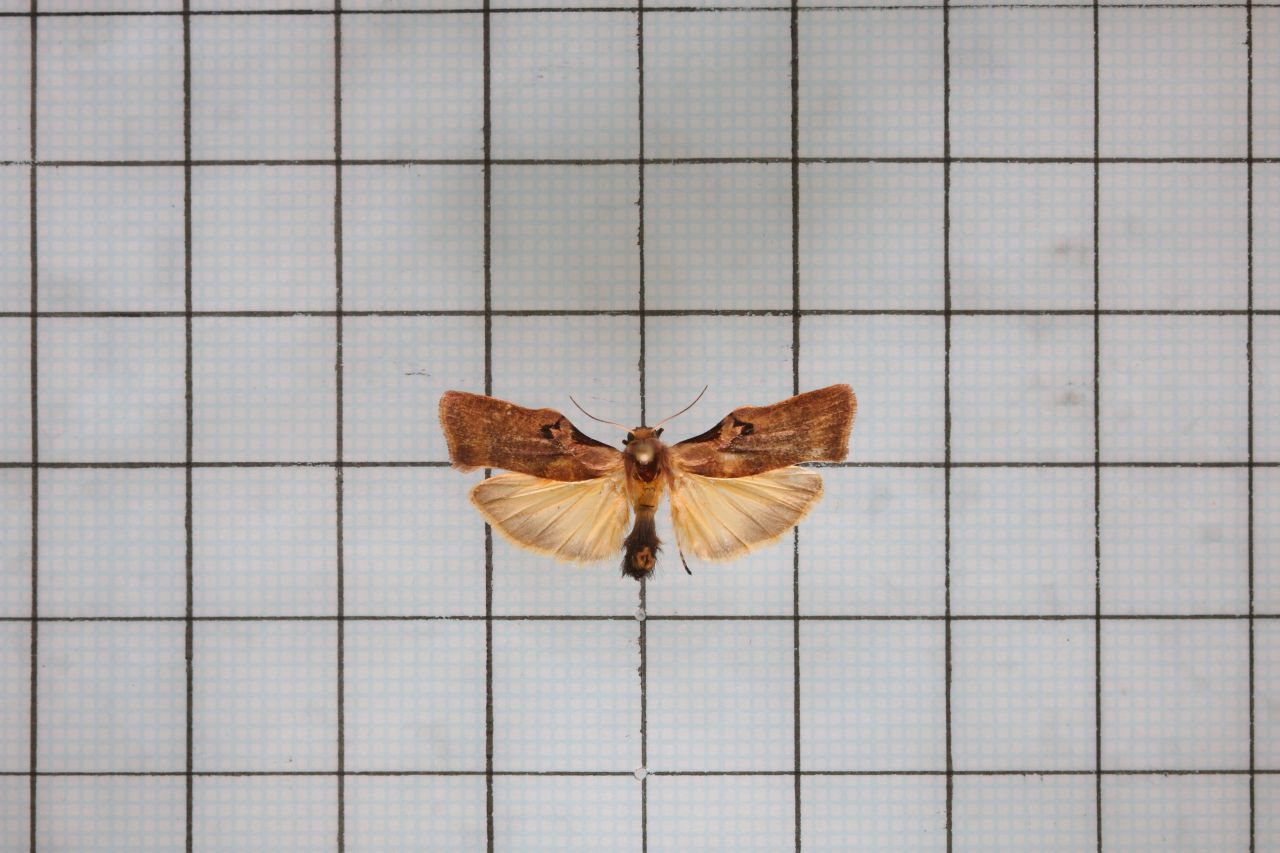

Scientific classification
- Kingdom: Animalia
- Phylum: Arthropoda
- Class: Insecta
- Order: Lepidoptera
- Superfamily: Noctuoidea
- Family: Erebidae
- Subfamily: Arctiinae
- Genus: Teulisna
- Species: T. tumida

Binomial name
- Teulisna tumida (Walker, 1862)

Synonyms
- Tegulata tumida Walker, 1862; Eilema tumida; Tegulata basistriga Moore, 1878; Lithosia (Teglata) tumida baibarensis Matsumura, 1927

= Teulisna tumida =

Species of moth

Teulisna tumida is a species of moth of the family Erebidae first described by Francis Walker in 1862. It is found in Borneo, Sumatra, China, India, Sri Lanka, Thailand and Taiwan.

== Description ==
Its wingspan is 28 mm. Forewing with the costal lobe present in both sexes. In the male, the head, thorax and basal segments of abdomen are pale brown, where the terminal segment is black. Forewing pale brown with a purplish tinge and suffused with fuscous. A black streak runs on the costal base and a large black spot at end of cell. Hindwings yellowish and fuscous suffused towards outer margin. In the female, the abdomen is fuscous and the anal tufts are ochreous. Forewings with a black spot at end of cell is reduced to a minute speck.

== Ecology ==
Commonly found in lower montane zones. The larvae feed on mosses.
