= Dolgoma nigrocribrata =

Scientific classification
- Kingdom: Animalia
- Phylum: Arthropoda
- Class: Insecta
- Order: Lepidoptera
- Superfamily: Noctuoidea
- Family: Erebidae
- Subfamily: Arctiinae
- Genus: Dolgoma
- Species: D. nigrocribrata

Binomial name
- Dolgoma nigrocribrata Dubatolov, Kishida & Wang, 2012

Species of moth

Dolgoma nigrocribrata is a moth of the family Erebidae. It is found in Guangdong, China.

The length of the forewings is about 11 millimetres (0.43 in).
