= Teulisna ruptifascia =

Scientific classification
- Domain: Eukaryota
- Kingdom: Animalia
- Phylum: Arthropoda
- Class: Insecta
- Order: Lepidoptera
- Superfamily: Noctuoidea
- Family: Erebidae
- Subfamily: Arctiinae
- Genus: Teulisna
- Species: T. ruptifascia

Binomial name
- Teulisna ruptifascia (Talbot, 1926)

Synonyms
- Ilema curviplaga ruptifascia Talbot, 1926; Eilema ruptifascia

Species of moth

Teulisna ruptifascia is a moth in the family Erebidae. It was described by George Talbot in 1926. It is found on Borneo. The habitat consists of upper montane forests.
