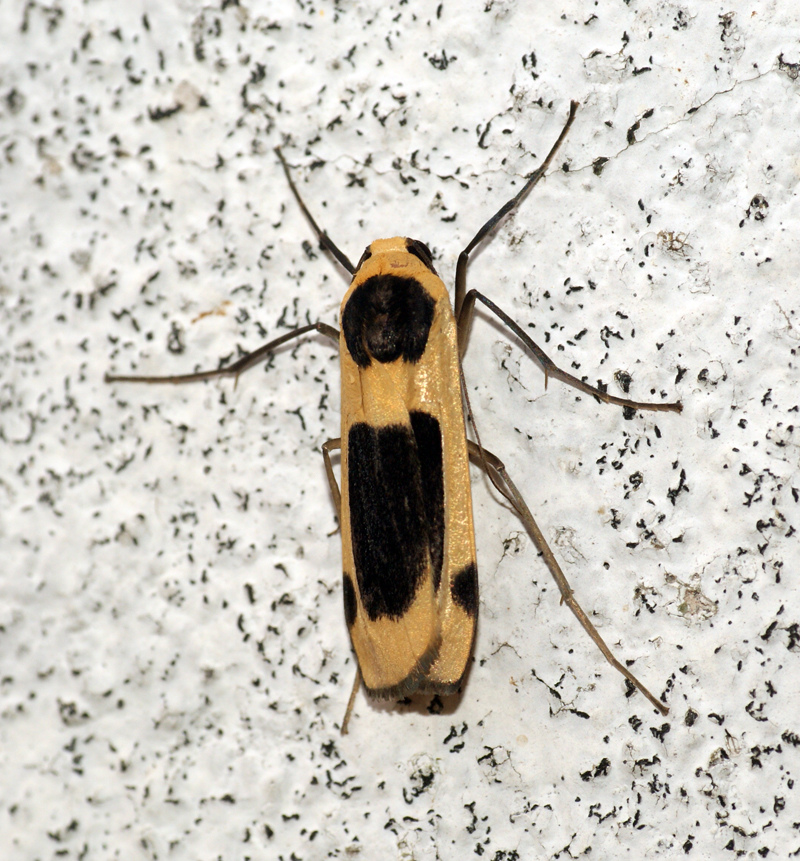

Scientific classification
- Domain: Eukaryota
- Kingdom: Animalia
- Phylum: Arthropoda
- Class: Insecta
- Order: Lepidoptera
- Superfamily: Noctuoidea
- Family: Erebidae
- Subfamily: Arctiinae
- Genus: Thysanoptyx
- Species: T. sordida

Binomial name
- Thysanoptyx sordida (Butler, 1881)

Synonyms
- Teulisna sordida Butler, 1881; Lithosia tetragona ab. sordida Butler: Draudt, 1914

= Thysanoptyx sordida =

Species of moth

Thysanoptyx sordida is a moth in the subfamily Arctiinae. It was described by Arthur Gardiner Butler in 1881. It is found in Thailand, China and India (Darjeeling).
