= Teulisna pallidicauda =

Scientific classification
- Kingdom: Animalia
- Phylum: Arthropoda
- Clade: Pancrustacea
- Class: Insecta
- Order: Lepidoptera
- Superfamily: Noctuoidea
- Family: Erebidae
- Subfamily: Arctiinae
- Genus: Teulisna
- Species: T. pallidicauda

Binomial name
- Teulisna pallidicauda Holloway, 2001

Species of moth

Teulisna pallidicauda is a moth in the family Erebidae. It was described by Jeremy Daniel Holloway in 2001. It is found on Borneo.

The length of the forewings is 13–14 mm.
