= Thysanoptyx oblonga =

Scientific classification
- Domain: Eukaryota
- Kingdom: Animalia
- Phylum: Arthropoda
- Class: Insecta
- Order: Lepidoptera
- Superfamily: Noctuoidea
- Family: Erebidae
- Subfamily: Arctiinae
- Genus: Thysanoptyx
- Species: T. oblonga

Binomial name
- Thysanoptyx oblonga (Butler, 1877)

Synonyms
- Teulisna oblonga Butler, 1877

Species of moth

Thysanoptyx oblonga is a moth of the subfamily Arctiinae first described by Arthur Gardiner Butler in 1877. It is found on Peninsular Malaysia, Sumatra, Java and Borneo. The habitat consists of lowland dipterocarp forests.
