= Teulisna tricornuta =

Scientific classification
- Kingdom: Animalia
- Phylum: Arthropoda
- Clade: Pancrustacea
- Class: Insecta
- Order: Lepidoptera
- Superfamily: Noctuoidea
- Family: Erebidae
- Subfamily: Arctiinae
- Genus: Teulisna
- Species: T. tricornuta

Binomial name
- Teulisna tricornuta Holloway, 2001

Species of moth

Teulisna tricornuta is a moth in the family Erebidae. It was described by Jeremy Daniel Holloway in 2001. It is found on Borneo. The habitat consists of lower montane areas.

The wingspan is about 11 mm.
