= Wittia yazakii =

Scientific classification
- Kingdom: Animalia
- Phylum: Arthropoda
- Class: Insecta
- Order: Lepidoptera
- Superfamily: Noctuoidea
- Family: Erebidae
- Subfamily: Arctiinae
- Genus: Wittia
- Species: W. yazakii

Binomial name
- Wittia yazakii Dubatolov, Kishida & Wang, 2012

Species of moth

Wittia yazakii is a moth of the family Erebidae. It is found in Guangdong, China.

The length of the forewings is about 10 millimetres (0.39 in) for males and 11–12 millimetres (0.43–0.47 in) for females. The forewings bright yellow and the hindwings are yellow without a pattern.
