= Dolgoma fukienica =

Scientific classification
- Domain: Eukaryota
- Kingdom: Animalia
- Phylum: Arthropoda
- Class: Insecta
- Order: Lepidoptera
- Superfamily: Noctuoidea
- Family: Erebidae
- Subfamily: Arctiinae
- Genus: Dolgoma
- Species: D. fukienica

Binomial name
- Dolgoma fukienica (Daniel, 1954)

Synonyms
- Lithosia fukienica Daniel, 1954; Eilema fukienica

Species of moth

Dolgoma fukienica is a moth of the family Erebidae. It is found in Fujian in south-eastern China.
