= Dolgoma reticulata =

Scientific classification
- Domain: Eukaryota
- Kingdom: Animalia
- Phylum: Arthropoda
- Class: Insecta
- Order: Lepidoptera
- Superfamily: Noctuoidea
- Family: Erebidae
- Subfamily: Arctiinae
- Genus: Dolgoma
- Species: D. reticulata

Binomial name
- Dolgoma reticulata (Moore, 1878)

Synonyms
- Lithosia reticulata Moore, 1878; Eilema reticulata

Species of moth

Dolgoma reticulata is a moth of the family Erebidae. It is found in the Himalayas.
