= Teulisna curviplaga =

Scientific classification
- Domain: Eukaryota
- Kingdom: Animalia
- Phylum: Arthropoda
- Class: Insecta
- Order: Lepidoptera
- Superfamily: Noctuoidea
- Family: Erebidae
- Subfamily: Arctiinae
- Genus: Teulisna
- Species: T. curviplaga

Binomial name
- Teulisna curviplaga (Rothschild, 1912)

Synonyms
- Ilema curviplaga Rothschild, 1912

Species of moth

Teulisna curviplaga is a moth in the family Erebidae. It was described by Walter Rothschild in 1912. It is found on Peninsular Malaysia and Borneo. The habitat consists of lower montane forests.
