= Dolgoma ovalis =

Scientific classification
- Kingdom: Animalia
- Phylum: Arthropoda
- Clade: Pancrustacea
- Class: Insecta
- Order: Lepidoptera
- Superfamily: Noctuoidea
- Family: Erebidae
- Subfamily: Arctiinae
- Genus: Dolgoma
- Species: D. ovalis

Binomial name
- Dolgoma ovalis Fang, 2000

Species of moth

Dolgoma ovalis is a moth of the family Erebidae. It is found in Shaanxi, China.
