= Dolgoma xanthocraspis =

Scientific classification
- Kingdom: Animalia
- Phylum: Arthropoda
- Class: Insecta
- Order: Lepidoptera
- Superfamily: Noctuoidea
- Family: Erebidae
- Subfamily: Arctiinae
- Genus: Dolgoma
- Species: D. xanthocraspis

Binomial name
- Dolgoma xanthocraspis (Hampson, 1900)

Synonyms
- Ilema xanthocraspis Hampson, 1900; Eilema xanthocraspis; Lithosia nigripars Hampson, 1894

Species of moth

Dolgoma xanthocraspis is a moth of the family Erebidae. It is found in eastern India and southern and central China.
