= Dolgoma cribrata =

Scientific classification
- Domain: Eukaryota
- Kingdom: Animalia
- Phylum: Arthropoda
- Class: Insecta
- Order: Lepidoptera
- Superfamily: Noctuoidea
- Family: Erebidae
- Subfamily: Arctiinae
- Genus: Dolgoma
- Species: D. cribrata

Binomial name
- Dolgoma cribrata (Staudinger, 1887)

Synonyms
- Lithosia cribrata Staudinger, 1887; Eilema cribrata; Eilema cribratum

Species of moth

Dolgoma cribrata is a moth of the family Erebidae first described by Otto Staudinger in 1887. It is found in eastern Asia, more specifically Russia (Amur, Primorye), China (Heilongjiang, Sichuan, Yunan), Korea and Japan.

The wingspan is 22–30 mm.
