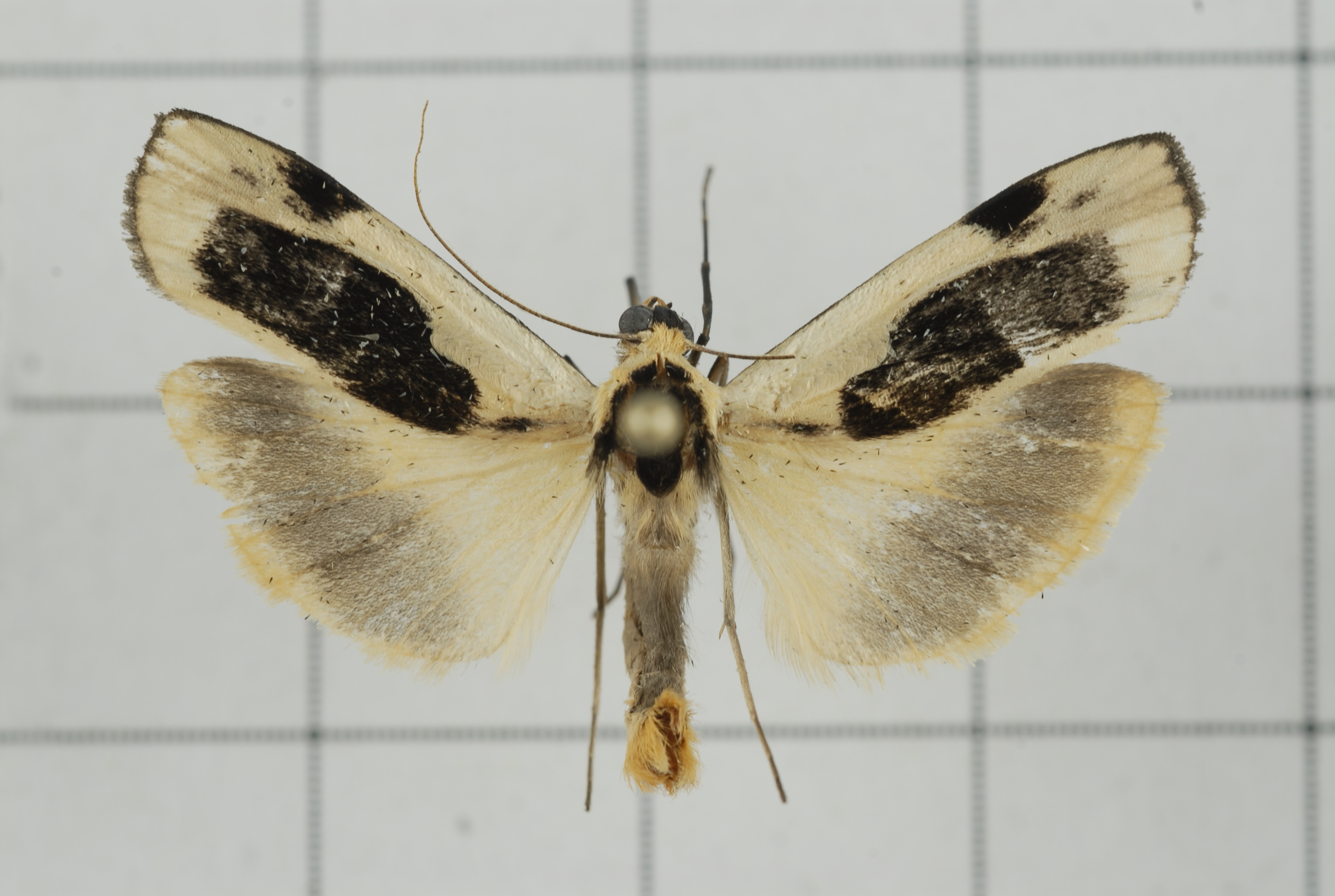

Scientific classification
- Domain: Eukaryota
- Kingdom: Animalia
- Phylum: Arthropoda
- Class: Insecta
- Order: Lepidoptera
- Superfamily: Noctuoidea
- Family: Erebidae
- Subfamily: Arctiinae
- Genus: Thysanoptyx
- Species: T. incurvata

Binomial name
- Thysanoptyx incurvata (Wileman & West, 1928)

Synonyms
- Eilema incurvata Wileman & West, 1928

= Thysanoptyx incurvata =

Species of moth

Thysanoptyx incurvata is a moth of the subfamily Arctiinae. It is found in Taiwan.
