= Wittia =

Scientific classification
- Domain: Eukaryota
- Kingdom: Animalia
- Phylum: Arthropoda
- Class: Insecta
- Order: Lepidoptera
- Superfamily: Noctuoidea
- Family: Erebidae
- Subfamily: Arctiinae
- Subtribe: Lithosiina
- Genus: Wittia de Freina, 1980

Synonyms
- Systropha Hübner, [1819] 1916; Strysopha Arora & Chaudhury, 1982

Genus of moths

Wittia is a genus of moths in the family Erebidae.

Most species were previously placed in the genus Eilema.

== Species ==
- Wittia klapperichi (Daniel, 1954)
- Wittia sororcula (Hufnagel, 1766)
- Wittia yazakii Dubatolov, Kishida & M. Wang, 2012
