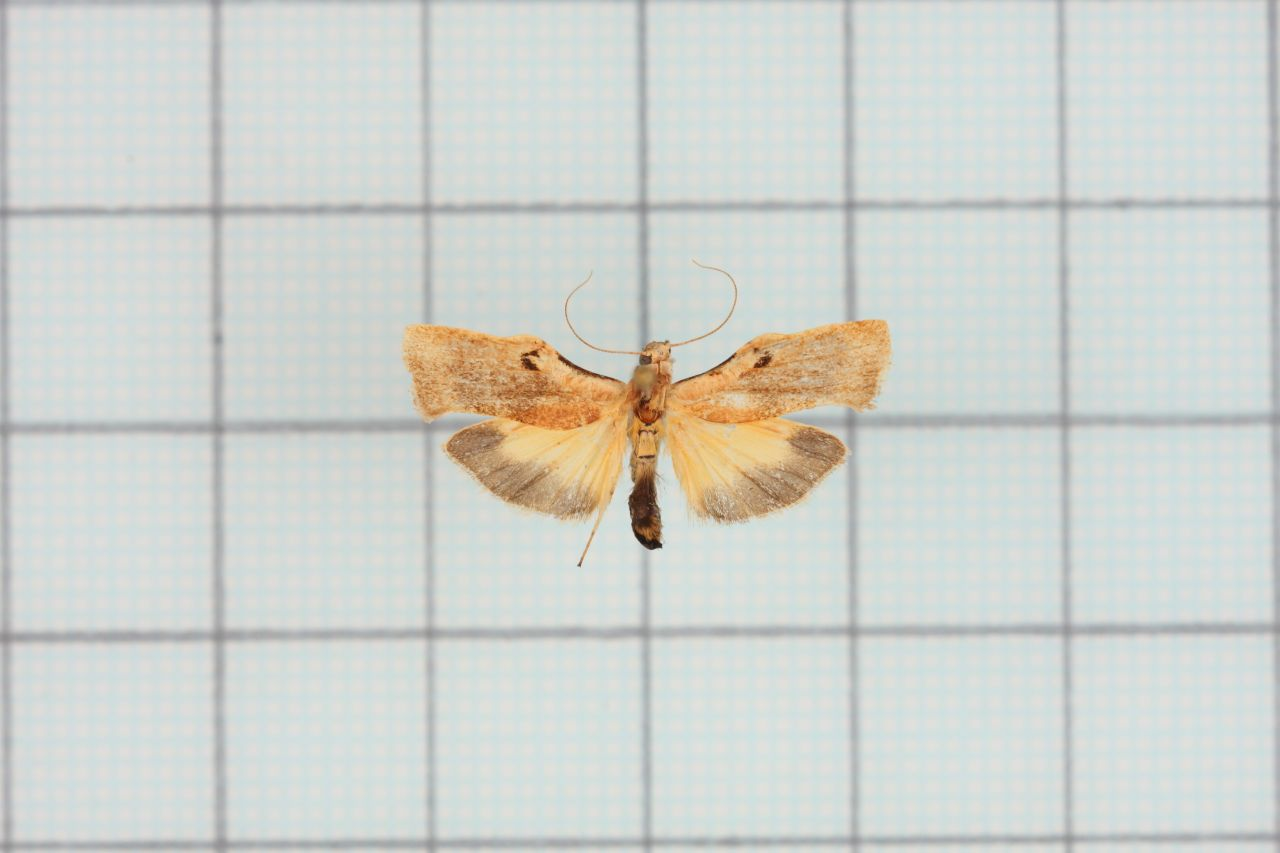
- Teulisna obliquistria acutapex

Scientific classification
- Kingdom: Animalia
- Phylum: Arthropoda
- Class: Insecta
- Order: Lepidoptera
- Superfamily: Noctuoidea
- Family: Erebidae
- Subfamily: Arctiinae
- Genus: Teulisna
- Species: T. obliquistria

Binomial name
- Teulisna obliquistria Hampson, 1894

Synonyms
- Eilema obliquistria (Hampson, 1894)

= Teulisna obliquistria =

Species of moth

Teulisna obliquistria is a moth of the family Erebidae. It is found in south-east Asia.

The wingspan is 25–29 mm. Adults are on wing in April and August.

== Subspecies ==
- Teulisna obliquistria obliquistria (Burma)
- Teulisna obliquistria acutapex Strand, 1917 (Taiwan)
