= Bitecta flaveola =

Scientific classification
- Domain: Eukaryota
- Kingdom: Animalia
- Phylum: Arthropoda
- Class: Insecta
- Order: Lepidoptera
- Superfamily: Noctuoidea
- Family: Erebidae
- Subfamily: Arctiinae
- Genus: Bitecta
- Species: B. flaveola

Binomial name
- Bitecta flaveola Rothschild, 1912

Synonyms
- Teulisna flaveola

Species of moth

Bitecta flaveola is a moth of the subfamily Arctiinae. It was described by Rothschild in 1912. It is found in New Guinea.
