= Teulisna setiniformis =

Scientific classification
- Kingdom: Animalia
- Phylum: Arthropoda
- Class: Insecta
- Order: Lepidoptera
- Superfamily: Noctuoidea
- Family: Erebidae
- Subfamily: Arctiinae
- Genus: Teulisna
- Species: T. setiniformis

Binomial name
- Teulisna setiniformis (Hampson, 1900)

Synonyms
- Ilema setiniformis Hampson, 1900; Eilema setiniformis

Species of moth

Teulisna setiniformis is a moth in the family Erebidae. It was described by George Hampson in 1900. It is found on Java.
