= Teulisna bipectinis =

Scientific classification
- Kingdom: Animalia
- Phylum: Arthropoda
- Clade: Pancrustacea
- Class: Insecta
- Order: Lepidoptera
- Superfamily: Noctuoidea
- Family: Erebidae
- Subfamily: Arctiinae
- Genus: Teulisna
- Species: T. bipectinis

Binomial name
- Teulisna bipectinis Fang, 2000

Species of moth

Teulisna bipectinis is a moth of the family Erebidae. It is found in China (Yunnan, Guangxi, Hainan and Guangdong).
