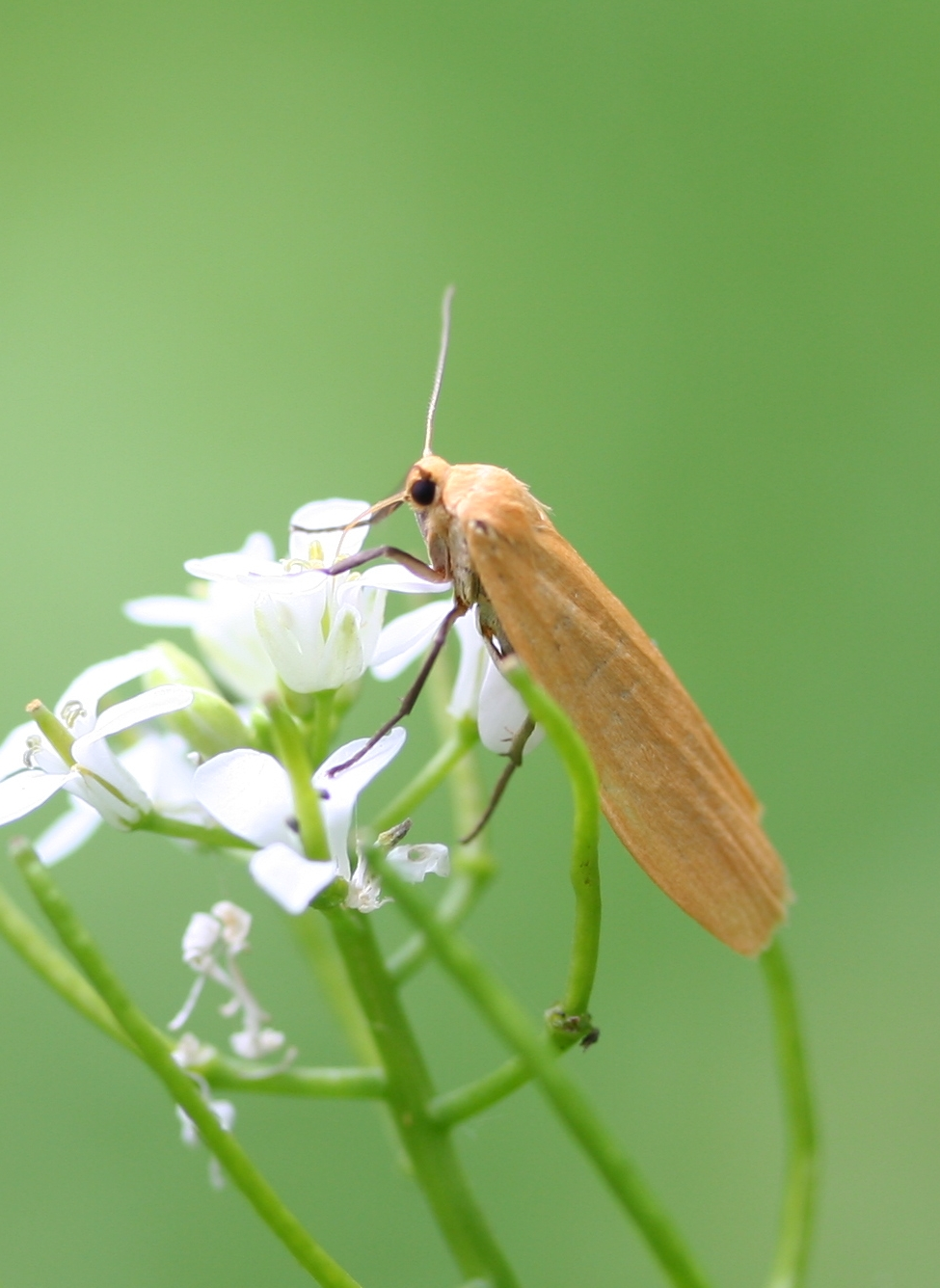

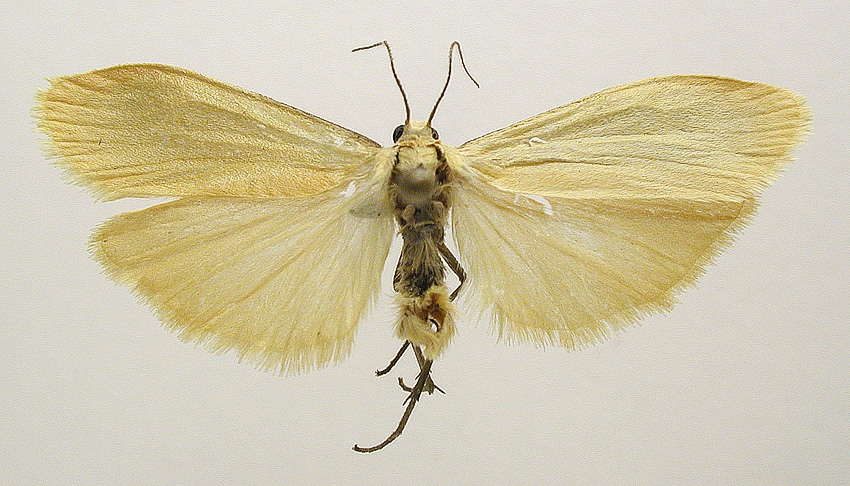

Scientific classification
- Domain: Eukaryota
- Kingdom: Animalia
- Phylum: Arthropoda
- Class: Insecta
- Order: Lepidoptera
- Superfamily: Noctuoidea
- Family: Erebidae
- Subfamily: Arctiinae
- Genus: Wittia
- Species: W. sororcula

Binomial name
- Wittia sororcula (Hufnagel, 1766)

Synonyms
- Phalaena sororcula Hufnagel, 1766; Eilema sororcula crocella Geoffroy, 1785; Noctua unita Esper, 1787; Bombyx aureola Hübner, [1803]; Lithosia aurantia Haworth, 1809; Lithosia flava Lempke, 1938; Systropha sororcula orientalis Daniel, 1954; Eilema plumbea Rebel, 1912

= Wittia sororcula =

Orange footman

Species of moth

Wittia sororcula, the orange footman, is a species of moth in the family Erebidae. The species was first described by Johann Siegfried Hufnagel in 1766. It is found in Europe, Anatolia and further east across the Palearctic to southern Siberia and the Amur basin to China.

== Technical description and variation ==
The wingspan is 27–30 millimetres (1.1–1.2 in). Forewing with the costa strongly convex and therefore the apical portion of the forewing considerably broader than in the forms of the luterella group. Head, thorax, end of abdomen and the forewing bright golden yellow, the hindwing of male but little paler; in the female both wings slightly paler orange yellow. In contradistinction to lutarella, the costal area of the hindwing above and beneath is never black.

== Transfer from Eilema to Wittia ==
The orange footman was previously placed in the genus Eilema, but was transferred to the genus Wittia by Vladimir Viktorovitch Dubatolov in 2011.

== Subspecies ==
- Wittia sororcula sororcula
- Wittia sororcula orientis (Daniel, 1954)

== Biology ==
The moth flies from April to June depending on the location. Larva blackish, with two yellow dorsal stripes with red dots and white spots. The larvae feed on lichen on trees, both on conifers (Ochsenhemer) and on deciduous trees (Spuler). It can be obtained by beating saplings, bushes and grass. It is sometimes found feeding at flowers in the daytime.

== Gallery ==
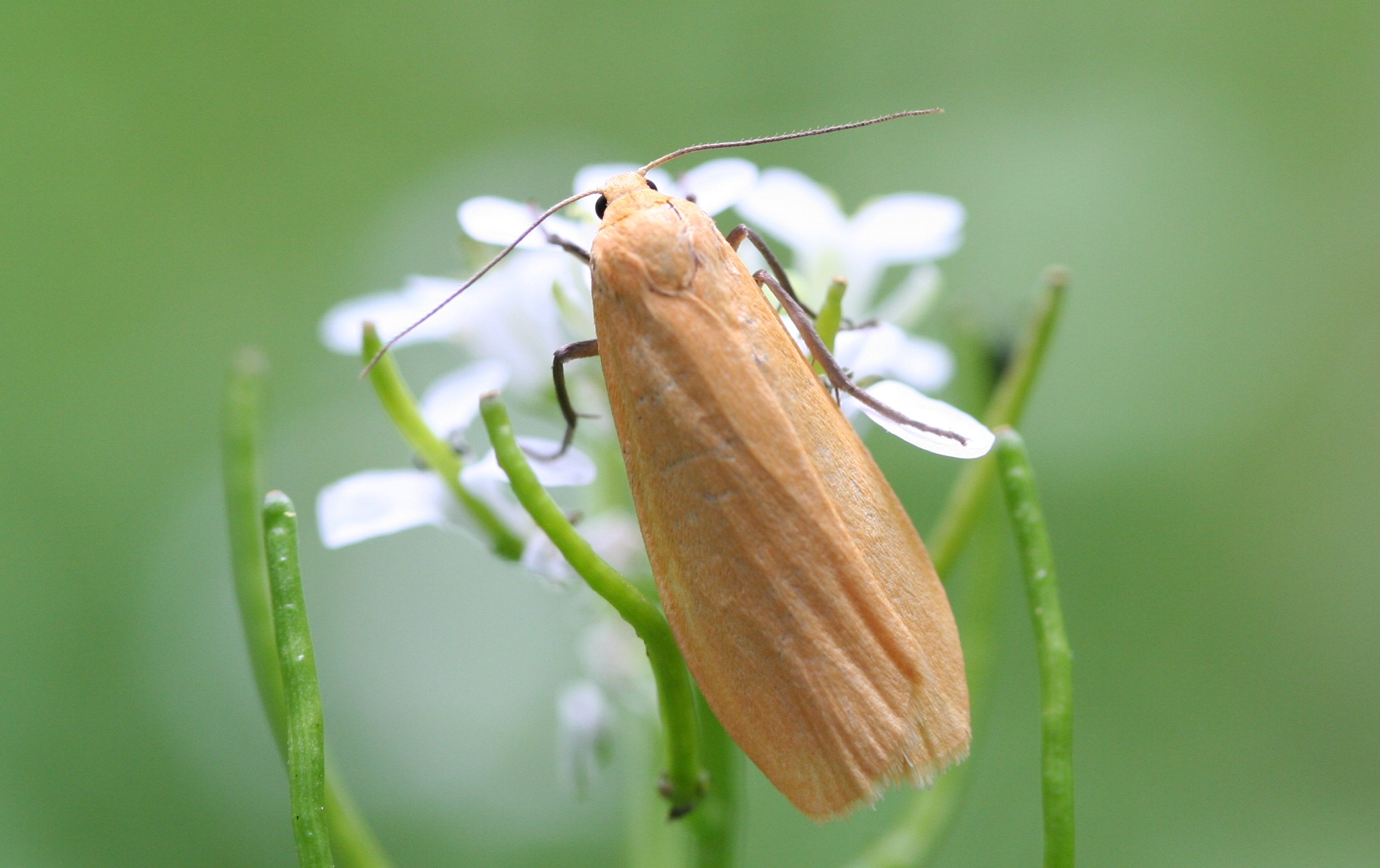

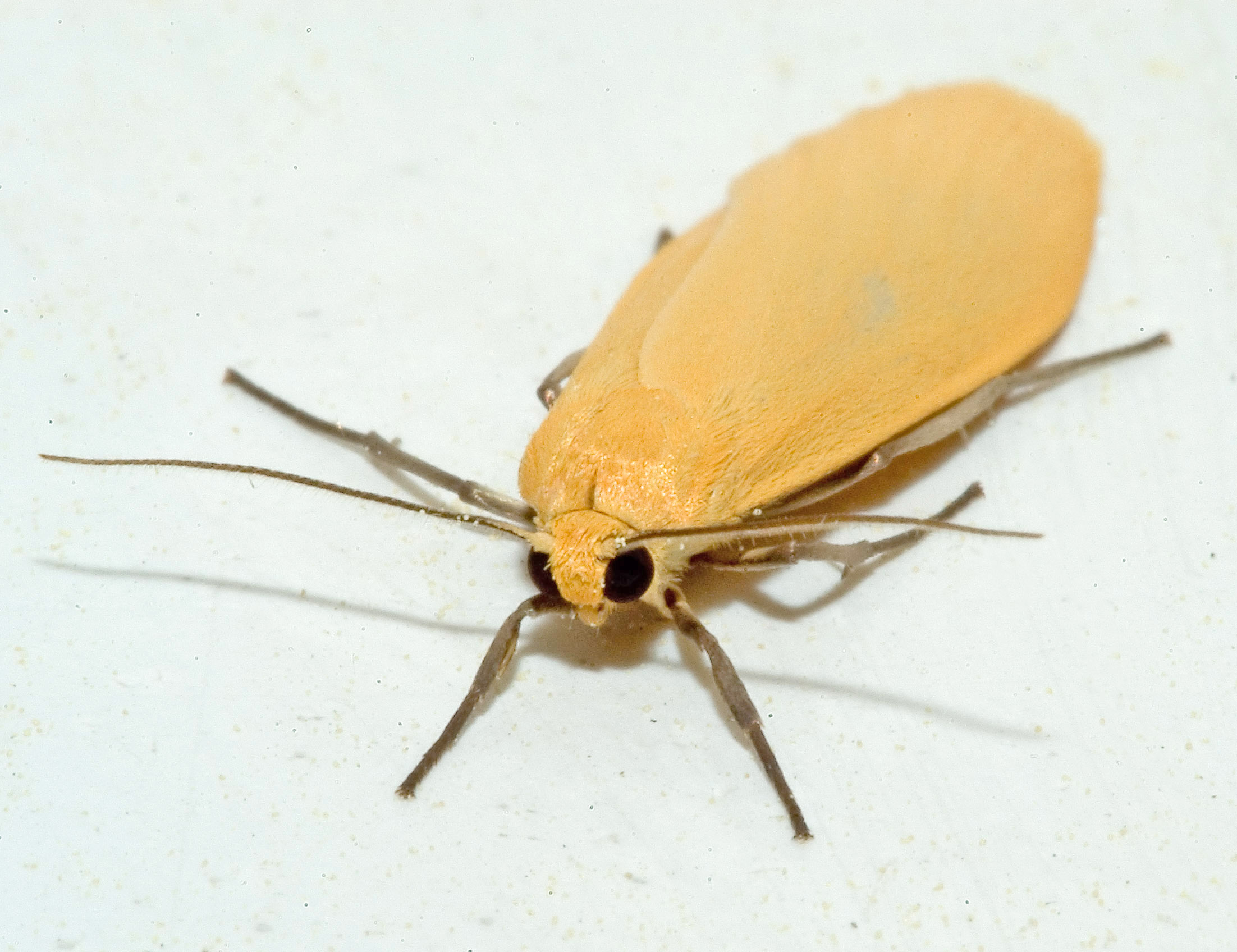

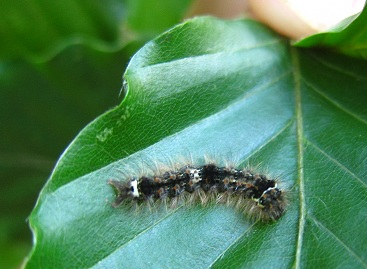
Larva
