= Teulisna chiloides =

Scientific classification
- Kingdom: Animalia
- Phylum: Arthropoda
- Class: Insecta
- Order: Lepidoptera
- Superfamily: Noctuoidea
- Family: Erebidae
- Subfamily: Arctiinae
- Genus: Teulisna
- Species: T. chiloides

Binomial name
- Teulisna chiloides Francis Walker, 1862

Synonyms
- Corcura torta Walker, 1862; Ityca humeralis Walker, 1866; Diastrophia dasypyga Felder, 1874; Ilema violitincta Rothschild, 1912

Species of moth

Teulisna chiloides is a moth in the family Erebidae. It was described by Francis Walker in 1862. It is found on Peninsular Malaysia, Sumatra, Borneo, Sulawesi and Sumbawa. It has also been recorded from Queensland, Australia. The habitat consists of lowland dipterocarp forests, alluvial forests and lower montane forests.

== Subspecies ==
- Teulisna chiloides chiloides (Peninsular Malaysia, Sumatra, Borneo)
- Teulisna chiloides dasypyga (Felder, 1874) (Sulawesi)
- Teulisna chiloides violitincta (Rothschild, 1912) (Sumbawa)
