= Dolgoma recta =

Scientific classification
- Domain: Eukaryota
- Kingdom: Animalia
- Phylum: Arthropoda
- Class: Insecta
- Order: Lepidoptera
- Superfamily: Noctuoidea
- Family: Erebidae
- Subfamily: Arctiinae
- Genus: Dolgoma
- Species: D. recta

Binomial name
- Dolgoma recta Černý, 2009

Species of moth

Dolgoma recta is a moth of the family Erebidae. It is found in Thailand.
