= Teulisna atratella =

Scientific classification
- Kingdom: Animalia
- Phylum: Arthropoda
- Class: Insecta
- Order: Lepidoptera
- Superfamily: Noctuoidea
- Family: Erebidae
- Subfamily: Arctiinae
- Genus: Teulisna
- Species: T. atratella

Binomial name
- Teulisna atratella (Walker, 1864)

Synonyms
- Ilema plagiata atratella

Species of moth

Teulisna atratella is a moth in the family Erebidae. It was described by Francis Walker in 1864. It is found on Java and Bali.
