= Teulisna basigera =

Scientific classification
- Kingdom: Animalia
- Phylum: Arthropoda
- Class: Insecta
- Order: Lepidoptera
- Superfamily: Noctuoidea
- Family: Erebidae
- Subfamily: Arctiinae
- Genus: Teulisna
- Species: T. basigera

Binomial name
- Teulisna basigera (Walker, [1865])

Synonyms
- Cossa basigera Walker, [1865]; Cossa ruma Swinhoe, 1890; Eilema ruma

Species of moth

Teulisna basigera is a moth of the family Erebidae first described by Francis Walker in 1865. It is found in India.
