= Teulisna nigricauda =

Scientific classification
- Kingdom: Animalia
- Phylum: Arthropoda
- Clade: Pancrustacea
- Class: Insecta
- Order: Lepidoptera
- Superfamily: Noctuoidea
- Family: Erebidae
- Subfamily: Arctiinae
- Genus: Teulisna
- Species: T. nigricauda

Binomial name
- Teulisna nigricauda Holloway, 1982

Species of moth

Teulisna nigricauda is a moth in the family Erebidae. It was described by Jeremy Daniel Holloway in 1982. It is found on Peninsular Malaysia and Borneo. The habitat consists of lower montane forests.
