= Bitecta diastropha =

Scientific classification
- Domain: Eukaryota
- Kingdom: Animalia
- Phylum: Arthropoda
- Class: Insecta
- Order: Lepidoptera
- Superfamily: Noctuoidea
- Family: Erebidae
- Subfamily: Arctiinae
- Genus: Bitecta
- Species: B. diastropha

Binomial name
- Bitecta diastropha (Rothschild, 1920)

Synonyms
- Eilema diastropha Rothschild, 1920; Teulisna diastropha

Species of insect (moth)

Bitecta diastropha is a moth of the subfamily Arctiinae. It was described by Rothschild in 1920. It is found in western Sumatra.
