= Teulisna semibrunnea =

Scientific classification
- Kingdom: Animalia
- Phylum: Arthropoda
- Class: Insecta
- Order: Lepidoptera
- Superfamily: Noctuoidea
- Family: Erebidae
- Subfamily: Arctiinae
- Genus: Teulisna
- Species: T. semibrunnea

Binomial name
- Teulisna semibrunnea Heylaerts, 1891

Synonyms
- Ilema semibrunnea

Species of moth

Teulisna semibrunnea is a species of moth in the family Erebidae. It was first described by Dutch entomologist Franciscus J. M. Heylaerts in 1891. This species is native to the island of Java.
