= Bitecta xanthura =

Scientific classification
- Domain: Eukaryota
- Kingdom: Animalia
- Phylum: Arthropoda
- Class: Insecta
- Order: Lepidoptera
- Superfamily: Noctuoidea
- Family: Erebidae
- Subfamily: Arctiinae
- Genus: Bitecta
- Species: B. xanthura

Binomial name
- Bitecta xanthura Rothschild, 1920

Synonyms
- Teulisna xanthura

Species of moth

Bitecta xanthura is a moth of the subfamily Arctiinae. It was described by Rothschild in 1920. It is found in western Sumatra.
