= Teulisna perdentata =

Scientific classification
- Domain: Eukaryota
- Kingdom: Animalia
- Phylum: Arthropoda
- Class: Insecta
- Order: Lepidoptera
- Superfamily: Noctuoidea
- Family: Erebidae
- Subfamily: Arctiinae
- Genus: Teulisna
- Species: T. perdentata

Binomial name
- Teulisna perdentata (H. Druce, 1899)

Synonyms
- Ilema perdentata H. Druce, 1899; Eilema perdentata; Dolgoma perdentata

Species of moth

Teulisna perdentata is a moth of the family Erebidae first described by Herbert Druce in 1899. It is found in south-western China and Malacca.

== Taxonomy ==
It was formerly listed as a synonym of Teulisna nebulosa.
