= Teulisna quadratella =

Scientific classification
- Kingdom: Animalia
- Phylum: Arthropoda
- Clade: Pancrustacea
- Class: Insecta
- Order: Lepidoptera
- Superfamily: Noctuoidea
- Family: Erebidae
- Subfamily: Arctiinae
- Genus: Teulisna
- Species: T. quadratella

Binomial name
- Teulisna quadratella Holloway, 2001

Species of moth

Teulisna quadratella is a moth in the family Erebidae. It was described by Jeremy Daniel Holloway in 2001. It is found on Borneo. The habitat consists of lowland dipterocarp forests.

The length of the forewings is 10–12 mm for both males and females.
