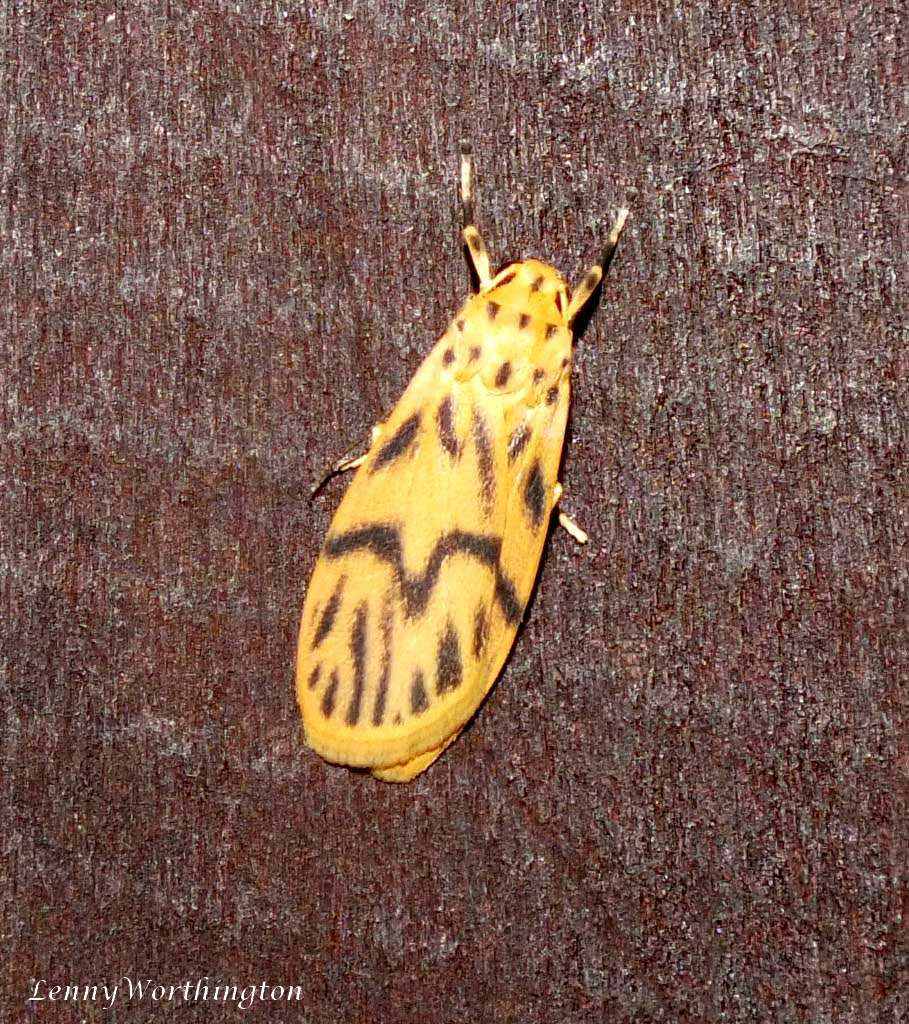

Scientific classification
- Kingdom: Animalia
- Phylum: Arthropoda
- Class: Insecta
- Order: Lepidoptera
- Superfamily: Noctuoidea
- Family: Erebidae
- Subfamily: Arctiinae
- Genus: Teulisna
- Species: T. nebulosa

Binomial name
- Teulisna nebulosa (Walker, 1862)

Synonyms
- Lithosia nebulosa Walker, 1862; Eilema nebulosa

= Teulisna nebulosa =

Species of moth

Teulisna nebulosa is a moth in the family Erebidae. It was described by Francis Walker in 1862. It is found on Peninsular Malaysia and Borneo. The habitat consists of lower montane forests.

There is strong sexual dimorphism in adults. Males are dull pale orange and females are paler straw.
