= Bitecta murina =

Scientific classification
- Domain: Eukaryota
- Kingdom: Animalia
- Phylum: Arthropoda
- Class: Insecta
- Order: Lepidoptera
- Superfamily: Noctuoidea
- Family: Erebidae
- Subfamily: Arctiinae
- Genus: Bitecta
- Species: B. murina

Binomial name
- Bitecta murina (Heylaerts, 1891)

Synonyms
- Lithosia murina Heylaerts, 1891; Teulisna murina

Species of moth

Bitecta murina is a moth of the subfamily Arctiinae. It was described by Franciscus J. M. Heylaerts in 1891. It is found on Java.
