= Dolgoma steineri =

Scientific classification
- Kingdom: Animalia
- Phylum: Arthropoda
- Clade: Pancrustacea
- Class: Insecta
- Order: Lepidoptera
- Superfamily: Noctuoidea
- Family: Erebidae
- Subfamily: Arctiinae
- Genus: Dolgoma
- Species: D. steineri

Binomial name
- Dolgoma steineri (Holloway, 2001)

Synonyms
- Teulisna steineri Holloway, 2001

Species of moth

Dolgoma steineri is a moth in the family Erebidae. It was described by Jeremy Daniel Holloway in 2001. It is found on Borneo. The habitat consists of montane and lowland areas.
