= Dolgoma oblitterans =

Scientific classification
- Kingdom: Animalia
- Phylum: Arthropoda
- Class: Insecta
- Order: Lepidoptera
- Superfamily: Noctuoidea
- Family: Erebidae
- Subfamily: Arctiinae
- Genus: Dolgoma
- Species: D. oblitterans

Binomial name
- Dolgoma oblitterans (R. Felder, 1868)

Synonyms
- Lithosia oblitterans Felder, 1868; Eilema oblitterans; Eilema oblitterans ab. kilimanjaronis Strand, 1922; Lithosia undulata Heylaerts, 1891

Species of moth

Dolgoma oblitterans is a moth of the family Erebidae first described by Rudolf Felder in 1868. It is found from the Himalayas, Sri Lanka to Yunnan. There is also a record from Tanzania.

== Description ==
Forewing with vein 9 stalked with veins 7 and 8. Forewing with the outer margin of moderate length. Male lack secondary sexual characters on the forewing. Head, thorax and forewing being purplish grey without fuscous suffusion. Forewing with the angulate band more prominent and less diffused. Hindwings are pale ochreous with a fuscous change.
