= Wittia klapperichi =

Scientific classification
- Domain: Eukaryota
- Kingdom: Animalia
- Phylum: Arthropoda
- Class: Insecta
- Order: Lepidoptera
- Superfamily: Noctuoidea
- Family: Erebidae
- Subfamily: Arctiinae
- Genus: Wittia
- Species: W. klapperichi

Binomial name
- Wittia klapperichi (Daniel, 1954)

Synonyms
- Systropha klapperichi Daniel, 1954; Eilema klapperichi; Dolgoma klapperichi

Species of moth

Wittia klapperichi is a moth of the family Erebidae. It is found in southern China (Zhejiang, Fujian, Sichuan, Yunnan and Guangdong).
