= Thysanoptyx =

Scientific classification
- Kingdom: Animalia
- Phylum: Arthropoda
- Class: Insecta
- Order: Lepidoptera
- Superfamily: Noctuoidea
- Family: Erebidae
- Subfamily: Arctiinae
- Subtribe: Lithosiina
- Genus: Thysanoptyx; Hampson, 1894

Genus of moths

Thysanoptyx is a genus of moths in the subfamily Arctiinae. The genus was erected by George Hampson in 1894.

== Species ==
- Thysanoptyx incurvata (Wileman & West, 1928)
- Thysanoptyx oblonga (Butler, 1877)
- Thysanoptyx sordida (Butler, 1881)
- Thysanoptyx tetragona (Walker, 1854)
