= Thysanoptyx tetragona =

Scientific classification
- Kingdom: Animalia
- Phylum: Arthropoda
- Class: Insecta
- Order: Lepidoptera
- Superfamily: Noctuoidea
- Family: Erebidae
- Subfamily: Arctiinae
- Genus: Thysanoptyx
- Species: T. tetragona

Binomial name
- Thysanoptyx tetragona (Walker, 1854)

Synonyms
- Lithosia tetragona Walker, 1854; Teulisna tetragona

Species of moth

Thysanoptyx tetragona is a moth in the subfamily Arctiinae. It was described by Francis Walker in 1854. It is found in Bangladesh and Sikkim in India.
